= Paleofauna of the Eocene Okanagan Highlands =

The paleofauna of the Eocene Okanagan Highlands consists of Early Eocene arthropods, vertebrates, plus rare nematodes and molluscs found in geological formations of the northwestern North American Eocene Okanagan Highlands. The highlands lake bed series' as a whole are considered one of the great Canadian Lagerstätten. The paleofauna represents that of a late Ypresian upland temperate ecosystem immediately after the Paleocene-Eocene thermal maximum, and before the increased cooling of the middle and late Eocene to Oligocene. The fossiliferous deposits of the region were noted as early as 1873, with small amounts of systematic work happening in the 1880-90s on British Columbian sites, and 1920-30s for Washington sites. Focus and more detailed descriptive work on the Okanagan Highlands site started in the last 1970's. Most of the highlands sites are preserved as compression-impression fossils in "shales", but also includes a rare permineralized biota and an amber biota.

Major Eocene Okanagan Highlands sites

== Extent ==
The 1,000 km (620 mi) series of lacustrine deposits are located across the Central British Columbia, Canada southeast to northern central Washington state, United States. grouped informally into "Northern", "Central", and "Southern" sites. The Northern sites consist of unnamed Ootsa Group formations which outcrop as the "Driftwood shales" near Smithers, British Columbia, the "Horsefly shales", of an unnamed formation and unnamed group which outcrop around Horsefly, British Columbia, and possibly sites now considered lost in the Quesnel, British Columbia area, The Central sites represent Kamloops Group formations with the McAbee Fossil Beds, Tranquille River site and Falkland site, all in the Tranquille Formation, the Quichena site and Stump Lake site in the Coldwater Beds and outcrops of the Chu Chua Formation near Barriere, British Columbia. The Southern sites include the Princeton Group Allenby Formation sites surrounding Princeton, British Columbia, such as "Nine Mile Creek", "One Mile Creek", "Pleasant Valley", "Thomas Ranch", "Vermilian Bluffs", and "Whipsaw Creek". The Penticton Groups Kettle River, Marama and Marron Formations in the Boundary District along the Canada-United States border are closely correlated with the Klondike Mountain Formation across the border. The most southerly of the Okanagan Highlands lakes, the Klondike Mountain Formation in Northern Ferry County, Washington include the "Boot Hill site", "Corner Lot site", "Gold Mountain site", "Knob Hill site", and "Mount Elizabeth site".

There is debate as to the affiliation of the, potentially lost, Quesnel sites with the Greater Okanagan Highlands. Archibald et al. (2018) in a monograph of the Highlands Hymenoptera families included them as part of the series. However the certainty for the placement was questioned earlier by Eberle et al. (2017) and Archibald and Cannings (2022) who opted to tentatively exclude Quesnel from the highlands while discussing the history of field collecting in the region.

== Paleofauna ==
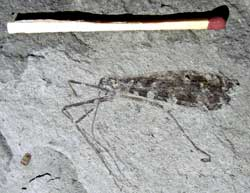
C. bittaciformis

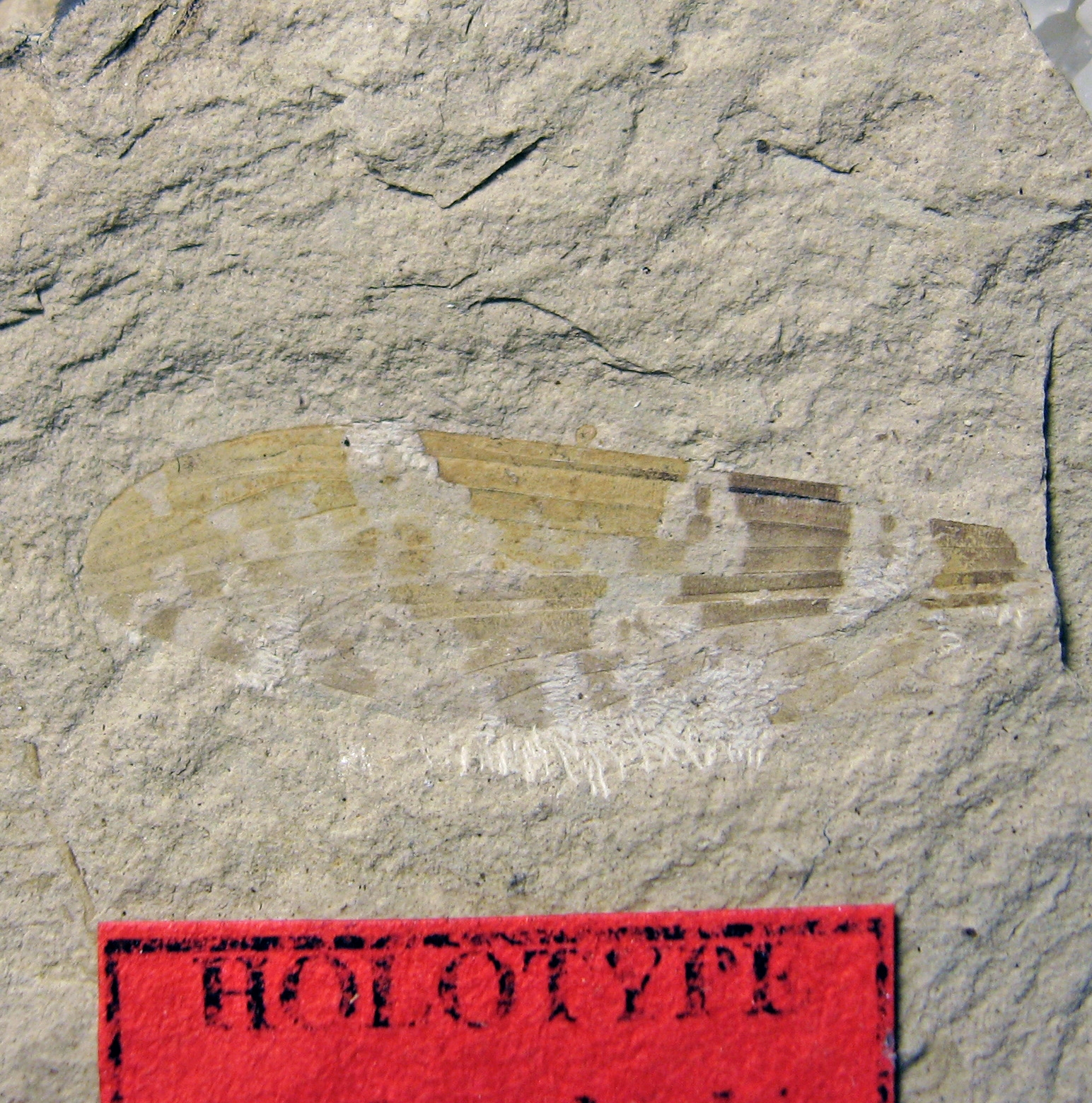
C. brooksi

Cimbrophlebia species
Fur Formation (left), Okanagan Highlands (right)

The Okanagan highlands represent a snapshot of lake, wetlands, and montane forest animal life which existed approximately 15 million years ago after the Cretaceous–Paleogene extinction event. The temperate upland lakes hosted insects, fish, birds, and mammals with the notably well preserved megafossils often retaining insect colour patterns, gnat wing membrane hairs, and whole bird feathers. In some cases the fine detail preservation of soft parts allows for the preservation of internal anatomy.

Archibald and Makarkin (2006) suggested the disjunct distribution of genera between the Danish western Limfjord coasts Fur Formation and the Okanagan highlands may have been enabled by rising crust elevations in the northern Atlantic region and subsequent increase in landmass during the Late Paleocene which linked Northern Europe with Greenland until at least the Early Eocene. Several land bridge routes may have acted as migration corridors for biotic interchange, the northern De Geer land bridge from Fennoscandia to North America via northern Greenland, and the southern Thulean land bridge from northern Britain though the Faroe Islands and then Greenland and North America. Several insect genera share disjunct distributions between the highlands and Limfjord including the mecopteran Cimbrophlebia, the giant lacewing Palaeopsychops, the green lacewing Protochrysa, the bull dog ant Ypresiomyrma.

The Hat Creek Amber deposits in the central region provide evidence for small and microbiotic elements of the Okanagan Highlands forests though entombed organisms such at terrestrial nematodes and microwasps that otherwise would likely not be preserved in the lake environments. The highlands as a whole have been described as one of the "Great Canadian Lagerstätten" based on the diversity, quality and unique nature of the biotas that are preserved. The highlands temperate biome, preserved across a large transect of lakes, recorded many of the earliest appearances of modern genera, while also documenting the last stands of ancient lines. David Grimaldi et al. (2018) during discussion of inclusions in Alaskan Chickaloon amber, noted the Okanagan Highlands record of latitudinal extinctions, specifically the modern southern hemisphere endemic groups Eomeropidae mecopterans and Myrmeciinae bulldog ants.

== Lithology ==
The majority of the lake deposits are compression fossils in lake bed sediments noted for both the paleofauna and paleofloras, with an additional pair of important non-compression biotas. A permineralized chert flora, the Princeton Chert is found along the Similkameen River interbedded with coal deposits of the Ashnola shale unit, Allenby Formation known for anatomically preserved plants. In the Central sites, subbituminous coal of the Hat Creek Coalfield around Hat Creek hosts an entombment biota, the Hat Creek amber, which preserves highlands faunal elements that are not found in the compression biotas. Initial discussion of the amber presented by George Poinar, Jr. et al. (1999) suggested the Hat Creek amber producing tree was likely to be an araucarian tree in the genus Agathis, based on unreported magnetic resonance spectroscopic analysis and earlier reports of the genus in Mesozoic Canada. A purported occurrence of Araucaria at the McAbee site was used as additional support for the ambers origin. The Agathis origin for Canadian Mesozoic amber was later called into question by Ryan McKellar and Alexander Wolfe (2010) based on a lack of any araucarian macrofossil history in the northern hemisphere the McAbee fossils having been already reidentifed as from the cupressaceous Cunninghamia. Based on Fourier-transform infrared spectroscopic analysis and associated amber inclusion fossils, they suggested the Mesozoic ambers of Canada to be from the extinct cupressaceous genus Parataxodium. The origin of the Hat Creek ambers was further noted as likely from a cupressaceous source by Grimaldi et al. (2018) who call out a primary floral component of the host coal being Metasequoia and that the coeval Puget Group Tiger Mountain amber of Washington state is also of Metasequoia origins. They hypothesize that the major amber producing plant of the Paleocene Pacific Northwest forests as Metasequoia, but note that further investigation of Chickaloon, Hat Creek, Coalmont, and Tiger Mountain ambers would be needed.

== Mollusks ==
Mollusks are a rare component of the highlands, usually being mentioned only in passing, such as by Mark Wilson (1977, 1978), and with fossils being reported from three sites only. A series of species were described from several Allenby Formation sites around Princeton by Russell (1957), who documented 4 gastropod species, and tentatively identified to genus another gastropod and a bivalve. Additional unidentified small bivalve fossils were mentioned from the Pleasant Valley site by Wilson (1977) and the Quilchena site by Wilson (1987), while unidentified gastropods were briefly mentioned by Kathleen Pigg et al. (2018).

Family	Genus	species	Sites	Notes	Images
Hydrobiidae	†Micropyrgus	†Micropyrgus camselli	Princeton	A hydrobiid mud snail	Micropyrgus camselli (left)
Lymnaeidae	Stagnicola	†Stagnicola tulameenensis	Princeton	A lymnaeine pond snail	Stagnicola tulameenensis
Physidae	Aplexa	†Aplexa ricei	Princeton	An aplexine bladder snail	Aplexa ricei
Physidae	Physa	†Physa saxarubrensis	Princeton	A physine bladder snail	Physa saxarubrensis
Planorbidae	Ferrissia	†Ferrissia arionoides	Princeton	An ancylinine ramshorn snail	Ferrissia arionoides (right)
Planorbidae	Gyraulus?	Indeterminate	Princeton	A possible planorbinine ramshorn snail Not described to species	Gyraulus? sp (center)
Sphaeriidae	Sphaerium?	Indeterminate	Princeton	A possible sphaeriine fingernail clam Not described to species	Sphaerium? sp.
Unidentified	Unidentified	Unidentified	Quilchena; Princeton	Unidentified freshwater bivalves.	
Unidentified	Unidentified	Unidentified	Republic	Unidentified freshwater gastropods.	Undescribed gastropod

== Nematodes ==
In the initial description of Hat Creek Amber, Poinar et al. make note of nematode specimens found in the deposit, with a brief commentary regarding them as the oldest terrestrial free-living nematode fossils to have been found up to that point, but did not give any specific taxonomic identification beyond that.

Family	Genus	species	Sites	Notes	Images
Unidentified	Unidentified	Unidentified	Hat Creek	Unidentified terrestrial specimens in amber	

== Arachnids ==
A single arachnid has been described fully from the Okanagan highlands, the Nursery web spider Palaeoperenethis thaleri, known from an adult male. This spider was likely aquatic as are the other members of the family, and based on morphological similarities, it was possibly closer in relation to African and Asian species in the Perenethis genus group then to the only modern genus in British Columbia Dolomedes. Another spider specimen, University of Alberta 5007 was noted by Wilson (1977) from the Kamloops area, while various spiders have been attributed to the McAbee fossil beds. Undescribed male and female orb-web spiders were figured by Wehr (1998) from the Princeton area. Unspecified spider compression fossils were mentioned as occurring in passing by David Greenwood et al. (2005) while discussing the increasing taxonomic richness of the highlands, but without specific site information. Additionally, undiscussed amber fossils were mentioned by Poinar et al. (1999) in their initial report of Hat Creek amber inclusions. Other arachnid evidence has been recovered in the form of fossil hymenopterans placed in families known predate or parasitize spiders. A diverse undescribed fauna of the "parasitoid" wasp family Ichneumonidae is known, some species of which are known to parasitize eggs or adult spiders. Another family, Sphecidae, which is a documented opportunistic predator of spiders and certain insects is known from a few isolated fossils at McAbee and Republic. Lastly the vespoid family Pompilidae has been found at both McAbee and Republic. This family, known as spider wasps, are behaviorally specialized as predators of spiders and a few other arachnids, provisioning newly laid eggs with a single spider as a larder to feed on while developing. Galling preserved on Acer species leaf fossils has been attributed to mites in the family Eriophyidae.

Family	Genus	species	Sites	Notes	Images
Araneidae	Unidentified	Unidentified	Princeton	An orb-weaver spider Not described to genus/species	
Pisauridae	Palaeoperenethis	Palaeoperenethis thaleri	Horsefly	A Nursery web spider	
Eriophyidae	Unidentified	Unidentified	Republic	Trace fossils Eriophyid gall mite galling on Acer leaves Not described to genus/species	
Unidentified	Unidentified	Unidentified	"Kamloops sites" Tranquille or Falkland; McAbee	Spider Compression fossils from Kamloops area locations Not described to family/genus/species	
Unidentified	Unidentified	Unidentified	McAbee	Possible Araneidae? or Tetragnathidae? fossils Not described to family/genus/species	
Unidentified	Unidentified	Unidentified	Unspecified	Spider compression fossils from unspecified highlands locations Not described to family/genus/species	
Unidentified	Unidentified	Unidentified	Hat Creek	Spider specimens in amber Not described to family/genus/species	

== Crustaceans ==
The earliest report of Crayfish from the highlands was by Wesley Wehr and Lisa Barksdale (1995). In a short Washington Geology article they reported the first identified occurrence of feathers from the Klondike Mountain Formation and crayfish from both there and the McAbee site. At that time, the moulted carapace section from Republic was not identified further than as a freshwater crayfish. The McAbee specimen was tentatively identified, from photograph, as being a possible Procambarus species fossil by malacologist Rodney M. Feldmann. Subsequently an additional series of over ten fossils were recovered from McAbee and described in 2011 as Aenigmastacus crandalli by Feldmann, Carrie Schweitzer, and John Leahy. A. crandalli was placed in the southern hemisphere superfamily Parastacoidea based on several morphological characters, and they noted this species to be the only northern hemisphere member of the superfamily.

At the Quilchena site, brief mention was reported in 2016 of ostracod fossils, though no further discussion or description has happened.

Family	Genus	species	Sites	Notes	Images
Parastacidae	Aenigmastacus	Aenigmastacus crandalli	McAbee	A parastacid crayfish. first illustrated as Procambarus sp. (1995)	
unidentified	Unidentified	unidentified	Republic	An unidentified crayfish	Crayfish moult undescribed
unidentified	Unidentified	unidentified	Quilchena	Unidentified ostracod shells	

== Insects ==
=== Dictyopterans ===
In the initial description of Hat Creek Amber, Poinar et al. make note of a single adult Corydiinae cockroach specimen found in the amber, with a brief commentary on the modern tropical-subtropical distribution of that subfamily and a lack of any native cockroach species in western Canada, but did not give any specific taxonomic identification for the specimen beyond that. Bruce Archibald with a group of paleoentomologists described the first cockroach species from the highlands in 2026 and noted Diploptera species are now restricted to the Australasian tropics and subtropics, possibly as a result of habitat loss after the Eocene.

Family	Genus	species	Sites	Notes	Images
Blaberidae	Diploptera	Diploptera praecisus	Quilchena; Republic	A beetle cockroach described from isolated tegmina.	holotype and paratypes
Blaberidae	Diploptera	Diploptera rothi	McAbee	A beetle cockroach described from a whole adult and a tegmin.	
Blaberidae	Diploptera	Diploptera simeoptera	Republic	A beetle cockroach described from isolated tegmina.	holotype and paratypes
Blaberidae	Diploptera	Undescribed	McAbee; Quilchena; Republic	A group of beetle cockroach tegmina. Possibly several new species, but not well enough preserved for naming.	
Blaberidae	Undescribed	Undescribed	Driftwood	Undescribed Diplopterine cockroaches.	
Blattoidae	Undescribed	Undescribed	Republic	A blattoidean cockroach Not described to genus/species	Undescribed Blattoidea
Corydiidae	Unidentified	Unidentified	Hat Creek	An undescribed corydiine cockroach	
Hodotermitidae	Unidentified	Unidentified	McAbee	Harvester termites Not described to genus/species	
Mastotermitidae	Undescribed	Undescribed	Driftwood; Falkland; McAbee; Horsefly; Princeton	Darwin termites Not described to genus/species	
undescribed	Undescribed	Undescribed	Republic	Undescribed termites of uncertain affiliation	undescribed isopteran

=== Coleopterans ===
The order Coleoptera is divided into four major lineages, Adephaga, Archostemata, Myxophaga, and Polyphaga, with the last group being the most species diverse of the four. Hat Creek amber has provided one fully described beetle species Prionocerites tattriei, which is known from a larval stage specimen first reported by Poinar et al. (1999). The species and genus were the first North American taxon from the family to be described.

==== Adephaga ====
Family	Genus	species	Sites	Notes	Images
Carabidae	Amara	†Amara paleomelas	Quilchena	A sun beetle First described as Nebria paleomelas	Amara paleomelas (1890 illustration)
Carabidae	Cf. Amara	Undescribed	Quilchena	A sun beetle relative	
Carabidae	Undescribed	Undescribed	McAbee; Quilchena; Republic	Undescribed ground beetles.	Unidentified Carabidae
Dytiscidae	Undescribed	Undescribed	Republic	A diving beetle	
Undescribed	Undescribed	Undescribed	Princeton	A caraboid superfamily beetle Displays traits similar to both tiger beetles and scarabs not identified to genus or species	

==== Archostemata ====
Family	Genus	species	Sites	Notes	Images
Cupedidae	Undescribed	Undescribed	McAbee	Reticulated beetles Not described to genus/species	

==== Polyphaga ====
===== Cucujiformia =====
Family	Genus	species	Sites	Notes	Images
Brentidae	†Eoceneithycerus	†Eoceneithycerus carpenteri	Republic	An Ithycerinae weevil	Eoceneithycerus carpenteri
Brentidae	†Ithyceroides	†Ithyceroides klondikensis	Republic	An Ithycerinae weevil	
Cerambycidae	Undescribed	Undescribed	McAbee; Quilchena?; Republic	long-horn beetles Not described to genus/species	
Chrysomelidae	†Cryptocephalites	†Cryptocephalites punctatus	Princeton	A cryptocephaline leaf beetle	Cryptocephalites punctatus (1895 illustration)
Chrysomelidae	Galerucella	†Galerucella picea	Princeton	A leaf beetle	Galerucella picea (1890 illustration)
Chrysomelidae	Caryobruchus–Speciomerus genus group	Undescribed	Driftwood?; McAbee; Quilchena; Republic	palm beetles, originally identified as cf. tribe Caryopemina.	
Chrysomelidae	Undescribed	Undescribed	McAbee; Republic	leaf beetles Not described to genus/species	
Curculionidae	Undescribed	Undescribed	Horsefly; McAbee; Quilchena; Republic	Undescribed weevils	
Mordellidae	Undescribed	Undescribed	McAbee	Pintail beetles Not described to genus/species	
Prionoceridae	†Prionocerites	†Prionocerites tattriei	Hat Creek	A Prionocerid beetle Described from a larval specimen First reported by Poinar et al. (1999 Fig.7) as "A beetle larva"	
Tenebrionidae	Tenebrio	†Tenebrio primigenius	Princeton	A darkling beetle	Tenebrio primigenius (1890 illustration)
Cf. Cleridae	Undescribed	Undescribed	McAbee	Undescribed checkered beetle relatives	
Cf. Erotylidae	Undescribed	Undescribed	Quilchena	Undescribed pleasing fungus beetle relatives.	
Unidentified	Undescribed	Undescribed	Republic	A cucujiform beetle not identified to family	

===== Elateriformia =====
Family	Genus	species	Sites	Notes	Images
Buprestidae	Buprestis	†Buprestis saxigena	Quilchena	A jewel beetle	Buprestis saxigena (1890 illustration)
Buprestidae	Buprestis	†Buprestis sepulta	Quilchena	A jewel beetle	Buprestis sepulta (1890 illustration)
Buprestidae	Buprestis	†Buprestis tertiaria	Quilchena	A jewel beetle	Buprestis tertiaria (1890 illustration)
Cantharidae	Undescribed	Undescribed	McAbee(?); Princeton	A soldier beetle not identified to genus or species	
Elateridae	Ligmargus	†Ligmargus terrestris	Quilchena	A click beetle First described as Cryptohypnus? terrestris	Ligmargus terrestris (1890 illustration)
Elateridae	Limonius	†Limonius impunctus	Princeton	a click beetle	Limonius impunctus (1895 illustration)
Elateridae	†Elaterites	undescribed	Quilchena	A click beetle.	Elateridae sp. indet (1890 illustration)
Elateridae	Undescribed	Undescribed	McAbee; Princeton; Republic	undescribed click beetles	

===== Scarabaeiformia =====
Family	Genus	species	Sites	Notes	Images
Lucanidae	Undescribed	Undescribed	Republic	A stag beetle	
Passalidae	Undescribed	Undescribed	McAbee	Bess beetles Not described to genus/species	
Trogidae	Trox	†Trox oustaleti	Princeton	A hide beetle	Trox oustaleti (1890 illustration)
Undescribed	Undescribed	Undescribed	Quilchena	Undescribed scarab superfamily beetles.	

===== Staphyliniformia =====
Family	Genus	species	Sites	Notes	Images
Hydrophilidae	Cercyon?	†Cercyon? terrigena	Quilchena	A water scavenger beetle	Cercyon? terrigena (1890 illustration)
Staphylinidae	Undescribed	Undescribed	Quilchena	Undescribed Omaliinae rove beetles.	
Unidentified	Undescribed	Undescribed	Republic	A possible staphylinoid beetle not described	

=== Dermapterans ===
Earwig fossils were first noted from republic by paleoentomologist Standley Lewis (1992) in his initial report of the insect diversity at Republic. He noted the fossils to be some of the oldest Eocene demapterans in North America at that time and figured one undescribed specimen consisting of a females abdomen section and cerci. Lewis (1994) tentatively identified the earwigs as members of family Forficulidae based on the shape of the cerci, and illustrated four female fossils, identified as such from the simple straight nature of the cercus. Lewis also suggested two different species were present, based on the differing lengths of the female cerci.

Family	Genus	species	Sites	Notes	Images
?Forficulidae	Undescribed	"Forficulid species 1"	Republic	A forficulid? earwig species with long cerci	"Forficulid species 1" undescribed
?Forficulidae	Undescribed	"Forficulid species 2"	Republic	A forficulid? earwig species with short cerci	"Forficulidae species 2" undescribed
?Forficulidae	Undescribed	Unidentified	McAbee	A possible forficulid earwig Not described to genus/species	
Forficulidae	Undescribed	Undescribed	Quilchena	A forficuline earwig of undetermined placement	

=== Dipterans ===
The most common animal fossils at many of the highlands sites are bibionid march flies, with over twenty species from the genera Penthetria and Plecia described. The modern diversity of the family is greatest in lower latitudes, and Plecia only reaches northward to the warm temperate areas of southeastern North America. In the initial description of Hat Creek Amber, Poinar et al. make note of dipteran inclusions found in the deposit but did not give any specific taxonomic identification of taxa or illustrate any specimen.

==== Brachycera ====
Family	Genus	species	Sites	Notes	Images
Agromyzidae	Undescribed	Undescribed	Princeton	Trace fossils Agromyzid leaf mining Not described to genus/species	
Dolichopodidae	Microphor	†Microphor defunctus	Princeton	A long-legged fly First described as Microphorus defunctus (1910), Moved to Microphor defunctus (1994)	Microphor defunctus (1910 illustration)
Empididae	Undescribed	Undescribed	Driftwood; Horsefly; Republic	dagger flies Not described to genus/species	
Pipunculidae	†Metanephrocerus	†Metanephrocerus belgardeae	Republic	A big headed fly	Metanephrocerus belgardeae
Pipunculidae	Indeterminate	indeterminate	Quilchena	Big headed flies, too incomplete to describe to genus	
Rhagionidae	Undescribed	Undescribed	Quilchena	snipe flies Not described to genus/species	
Syrphidae	Unidentified	Unidentified	Driftwood; Horsefly; McAbee; Quilchena; Republic	hover flies or, less likely, thick headed flies Not described to genus/species	

==== Nematocera ====
The highlands have been noted for the number of Bibionid taxa named in the early work on British Columbian sites. Over 25 unique species have been ascribed to the fossils, with the current count sitting at 22, but doubt has been raised as to the true number of species present and around the generic affinities. The first species was described by Scudder (1879 from the Allenby Formation, while the largest number of species were named by Handlirsch (1910). Following the practice of the time, both Scudder and Handlirsch placed their species in the genus Penthetria. Harington Molesworth Anthony Rice (1959) reviewed the British Columbian bibionids, notably deeming the majority of species as belonging to Plecia or an undescribed extinct genus and not Penthetria. This placement decision has been questioned however, with Giuseppe Gentilini (1991) asserting the majority of highlands species should be returned to Penthetria. Rice, noted to be a "splitter", also noted the large overlap between the morphology of two species groups and mused that larger collection samples may reveal each group to be single species. He called out in the species discussions the similarities between Plecia avus, P. canadensis, P. dilatata, P. pictipennis, P. pulchra, and P. transitoria, and the similarities between P. curtula, P. nana, P. pulla, and P. reducta.

Family	Genus	species	Sites	Notes	Images
Bibionidae	Penthetria?	†Penthetria? fryi	Driftwood; Princeton	A possible penthetrian march fly	Penthetria (?) fryi
Bibionidae	Penthetria	†Penthetria intermedia	Driftwood	A plecian marchfly First described as Mycetophaetus intermedius (1892), moved to Plecia intermedia (1959) moved to Penthetria intermedia (1999)	
Bibionidae	Penthetria	†Penthetria whipsawensis	Princeton	A penthetrian march fly	Penthetria whipsawensis
Bibionidae	Plecia	†Plecia angustipennis	Horsefly; Quilchena	A plecian marchfly First described as Penthetria angustipennis (1910), moved to Plecia angustipennis (1959)	Plecia angustipennis
Bibionidae	Plecia	†Plecia avus	Driftwood; Tranquille; Princeton	A plecian marchfly First described as Penthetria avus (1910), moved to Plecia avus (1959); Possibly synonymous with Pl. canadensis, Pl. dilatata, Pl. pictipennis, Pl. pulchra, and Pl. transitoria	Plecia avus
Bibionidae	Plecia	†Plecia cairnesi	Driftwood; Falkland	A plecian marchfly	Plecia cairnesi
Bibionidae	Plecia	†Plecia canadensis	Driftwood; Quilchena?; Princeton; Tranquille	A plecian marchfly First described as Penthetria canadensis (1910), moved to Plecia canadensis (1959); Possibly synonymous with Pl. avus Pl. dilatata, Pl. pictipennis, Pl. pulchra, and Pl. transitoria	Plecia canadensis
Bibionidae	Plecia	†Plecia curtula	Driftwood; Horsefly; Princeton	A plecian marchfly First described as Penthetria curtula (1910), moved to Plecia curtula (1959); Pe. avunculus (1910) considered a jr synonym (1959); Possibly synonymous with Pl. nana, Pl. pulla, and Pl. reducta	Plecia curtula
Bibionidae	Plecia	†Plecia dilatata	Horsefly; Princeton	A plecian marchfly First described as Penthetria dilatata (1910), moved to Plecia dilatata (1959); Possibly synonymous with Pl. avus, Pl. canadensis, Pl. pictipennis, Pl. pulchra, and Pl. transitoria	Plecia dilatata
Bibionidae	Plecia	†Plecia elatior	Princeton	A plecian marchfly First described as Penthetria elatior (1910), moved to Plecia elatior (1959)	Plecia elatior
Bibionidae	Plecia	†Plecia kelownaensis	Driftwood; Mission Creek	A plecian marchfly	Plecia kelownaensis
Bibionidae	Plecia	†Plecia minutula	Princeton	A plecian marchfly	Plecia minutula
Bibionidae	Plecia	†Plecia nana	Princeton	A plecian marchfly First described as Penthetria nana (1910), moved to Plecia nana (1959); Possibly synonymous with Pl. curtula, Pl. pulla, and Pl. reducta	Plecia nana
Bibionidae	Plecia	†Plecia pictipennis	Princeton; Quilchena	A plecian marchfly First described as Penthetria pictipennis (1910), moved to Plecia pictipennis (1959); Pe. lambei (1910), Pe. ovalis (1910), & Pe. separanda (1910) considered jr synonyms (1959); Possibly synonymous with Pl. avus, Pl. canadensis, Pl. dilatata, Pl. pulchra, and Pl. transitoria	Plecia pictipennis
Bibionidae	Plecia	†Plecia platyptera	Horsefly	A plecian marchfly First described as Penthetria platyptera (1910), moved to Plecia platyptera (1959)	Plecia platyptera
Bibionidae	Plecia	†Plecia pulchra	Princeton	A plecian marchfly First described as Penthetria pulchra (1910), moved to Plecia pulchra (1959); Possibly synonymous with Pl. avus, Pl. canadensis, Pl. dilatata, Pl. pictipennis, and Pl. transitoria	Plecia pulchra
Bibionidae	Plecia	†Plecia pulla	Princeton	A plecian marchfly First described as Penthetria pulla (1910), moved to Plecia pulla (1959); Pe. brevipes (1910) considered a jr synonym (1959); Possibly synonymous with Pl. curtula, Pl. nana, and Pl. reducta	Plecia pulla
Bibionidae	Plecia	†Plecia reducta	Driftwood; Horsefly; Princeton	A plecian marchfly First described as Penthetria reducta (1910), moved to Plecia reducta (1959); Possibly synonymous with Pl. curtula, Pl. nana, and Pl. pulla	Plecia reducta
Bibionidae	Plecia	†Plecia similkameena	Princeton; Tranquille	A plecian marchfly First described as Penthetria similkameena (1879) moved to Plecia similkameena (1885)	Plecia similkameena
Bibionidae	Plecia	†Plecia transitoria	Driftwood; Horsefly; Princeton; Tranquille	A plecian marchfly First described as Penthetria transitoria (1910), moved to Plecia transitoria (1959); Pe. falcatula (1910) & Pe. fragmentum (1910) considered jr synonyms (1959); Possibly synonymous with Pl. avus, Pl. canadensis, Pl. dilatata, Pl. pictipennis, and Pl. pulchra	Plecia transitoria
Bibionidae	Plecia	†Plecia tulameenensis	Princeton; Tranquille	A plecian marchfly	Plecia tulameenensis
Bibionidae	Undescribed	Undescribed	Republic	A march fly Not described to genus/species	Bibionidae undescribed
Bolitophilidae	Undescribed	Undescribed	Horsefly	A bolitophilid fungus gnat Not described to genus/species	
Cecidomyiidae	Undescribed	Undescribed	Princeton; Republic	Trace fossils Cecidomyiid midge galling on various host leaves Not described to genus/species	Cecidomyiidae gall on Prunus
Cylindrotomidae	Unidentified	Unidentified	McAbee	long-bodied craneflies Not described to genus/species	
Keroplatidae	Undescribed	Undescribed	Horsefly	A possible keroplatid fungus gnat Not described to genus/species	
Limoniidae	Unidentified	Unidentified	McAbee	Limoniid craneflies Not described to genus/species	
Mycetophilidae	Undescribed	Undescribed	Horsefly	A gnoristine fungus gnat Not described to genus/species	
Mycetophilidae	Undescribed	Undescribed	Horsefly	A leiine fungus gnat Not described to genus/species	
Mycetophilidae	Undescribed	Undescribed	Horsefly	A mycetophiline fungus gnat Not described to genus/species	
Mycetophilidae	Undescribed	Undescribed	Horsefly	A mycomyiine fungus gnat Not described to genus/species	
Mycetophilidae	Undescribed	Undescribed	Horsefly	A sciophiline fungus gnat Not described to genus/species	
Mycetophilidae	Undescribed	Undescribed	Driftwood; McAbee; Quilchena; Princeton; Republic	fungus gnats unplaced to subfamily Not described to genus/species	
Ptychopteridae	†Etoptychoptera	†Etoptychoptera tertiaria	Princeton	A phantom cranefly	Etoptychoptera tertiaria (1910 illustration)
Sciaridae	Unidentified	Unidentified	Driftwood; Horsefly; Quilchena	dark-winged fungus gnats Not described to genus/species	
Tipulidae	Tipula	†Tipula tulameena	Princeton	A cranefly	Tipula tulameena (1910 illustration)
Tipulidae	Undescribed	Undescribed	Driftwood; Horsefly; McAbee; Princeton; Quilchena; Republic	crane flies Not described to genus/species	Undescribed Tipulidae
Trichoceridae	Unidentified	Unidentified	McAbee	winter craneflies Not described to genus/species	
Unidentified	Unidentified	Unidentified	Hat Creek	Unidentified dipteran specimens in amber	

=== Ephemeropterans ===
Lewis (1992) listed one species of Heptageniidae and three specimens that he did not place to family from Republic. The next year Lewis and Wehr (1993) gave a slightly more detailed description of the specimens again identifying one to Heptageniidae, possibly in the genera Heptagenia or Stenonema. The specimens were later examined by Nina D. Sinitchenkova (1999) who described one as a squaregill mayfly and the oldest member of the genus Neoephemera, confirmed the Heptageniidae identification but that it was unidentifiable to genus. The last specimen she confirmed as an ephemeropteran, but unidentifiable below order level.

Family	Genus	species	Sites	Notes	Images
Heptageniidae	Indeterminate	Indeterminate	McAbee; Republic	A flat headed mayfly not identifiable to genus	Heptageniidae incertae sedis
Neoephemeridae	Neoephemera	†Neoephemera antiqua	Republic	A squaregill mayfly	

=== Hemipterans ===
Greenwood et al. (2005) briefly discussed the prevalence of Aphid fossils at highlands sites where the taphonomic factors allowed for fine detail preservation such as in the Driftwood shales. Poinar et al. (1999) made note of hemipteran specimens found in Hat Creek Amber but did not give any specific taxonomic identification or illustrate any specimens.

==== Auchenorrhyncha ====
Family	Genus	species	Sites	Notes	Images
Aphrophoridae	Aphrophora	Aphrophora angusta	Princeton	An aphrophorine spittle bug hindwing species.	Aphrophora angusta (1910 illustration)
Aphrophoridae	Aphrophora	"Indeterminate"	Princeton	An aphrophorine spittle bug not described to species.	
Aphrophoridae	Aphrophora	Undescribed	Republic	An aphrophorid spittlebug Not described to species.	Aphrophora species
Aphrophoridae	†Palaeoptysma	†Palaeoptysma venosa	Princeton	A spittle bug	Palaeoptysma venosa (1895 illustration)
Aphrophoridae	†Palaphrodes	"Indeterminate"	Princeton	An aphrophorine spittle bug not described to species.	
Aphrophoridae	†Petrolystra	Undescribed	Republic	An aphrophorid spittlebug Not described to species.	
Aphrophoridae	†Ptysmaphora	†Ptysmaphora fletcheri	Princeton	A spittle bug	Ptysmaphora fletcheri (1895 illustration)
Cercopidae	Cercopis	†Cercopis grandescens	Princeton	A froghopper	Cercopis grandescens (1895 illustration)
Cercopidae	Cercopis	†Cercopis selwyni	Princeton	A froghopper	Cercopis selwyni (1890 illustration)
Cercopidae	†Cercopites	†Cercopites torpescens	Princeton	A froghopper	Cercopites torpescens (1895 illustration)
Cercopidae	†Dawsonites	†Dawsonites veter	Princeton	A froghopper	Dawsonites veter (1895 illustration)
Cercopidae	†Palecphora	Undescribed	Princeton; Republic	A froghopper not described to species.	
Cercopidae	†Stenecphora	†Stenecphora punctulata	Princeton	A froghopper	Stenecphora punctulata (1895 illustration)
Cercopidae	†Stenolocris	†Stenolocris venosa	Princeton	A froghopper	Stenolocris venosa (1895 illustration)
Cercopidae	Undescribed	Undescribed	Driftwood; McAbee; Quilchena; Republic	cercopid froghoppers Not described to genus/species.	undescribed Cercopidae
Cicadellidae	Coelidia	†Coelidia columbiana	Princeton	A leafhopper	Coelidia columbiana (1890 illustration)
Cicadellidae	Undescribed	Undescribed	Driftwood; McAbee; Quilchena	leafhoppers Not described to genus/species.	
Cicadidae	Undescribed	Undescribed	McAbee	True cicadas Not described to Family/genus/species	
Cixiidae	Undescribed	Undescribed	Quilchena	A cixiid planthopper Not described to genus/species.	
Fulgoridae	Enchophora	"Indeterminate"	Princeton	An enchophorine lantern bug not described to species.	
Ricaniidae	Undescribed	Undescribed	McAbee; Quilchena	A ricaniid planthopper Not described to genus/species.	
Undescribed	Undescribed	Undescribed	Republic	A fulgoroidean hopper Not described to family/genus/species.	
Incertae sedis	†Planophlebia	†Planophlebia gigantea	Princeton	A hemipteran of uncertain placement	Planophlebia gigantea (1890 illustration)

==== Heteroptera ====
Family	Genus	species	Sites	Notes	Images
Cf. Coreidae	Undescribed	Undescribed	McAbee	Relatives of leaf-footed bugs Not described to Family/genus/species	
Cydnidae	Undescribed	Undescribed	Quilchena	A cydnid burrowing bug Not described to genus/species.	
Dinidoridae	Megymenum	Undescribed	Quilchena	A dinidorid shield bug Not described to genus/species.	
Gerridae	Gerris	Undescribed	McAbee	gerrine water striders Not described to genus/species	
Gerridae	Limnoporus	†Limnoporus wilsoni	Driftwood	A gerrine water strider	
Gerridae	†Telmatrechus	†Telmatrechus defunctus	Quilchena	A gerrine water strider First described as "Gerris" defunctus (1910)	Telmatrechus defunctus (1910 illustration)
Gerridae	†Telmatrechus	†Telmatrechus stali	Princeton	A gerrine water strider First described as "Hygrotrechus" stali (1879), later moved to "Gerris" stali (1910)	Telmatrechus stali (1890 illustration)
Pentatomidae	Undescribed	Undescribed	Princeton; Republic	A Shield or stink bug Not described to genus/species	undescribed Pentatomidae
Cf. Pentatomidae	Undescribed	Undescribed	Quilchena	Pentatomoid shield bugs of uncertain familial placement Not described to genus/species.	

==== Sternorrhyncha ====
Family	Genus	species	Sites	Notes	Images
Aphididae	Undescribed	Undescribed	McAbee; Quilchena; Republic	Aphids; Not described to genus/species.	
Aphididae	Undescribed	Undescribed	Republic	Trace fossils Woolly aphid leaf rolling on Ulmus leaves Not described to genus/species	
Unidentified	Unidentified	Unidentified	Driftwood	aphidoid specimens Not described to genus/species	

==== Unidentified ====
Family	Genus	species	Sites	Notes	Images
Unidentified	Unidentified	Unidentified	Hat Creek	Hemipterans in amber Not identified in any finer taxonomic detail	

=== Hymenopterans ===
Archibald, Mathewes, & Aase (2023) reported a Titanomyrma species ant queen from Allenby Formation, and noted the range extension for Formiciinae into the highlands, as the subfamily was previously considered a strictly thermophilic ant group. Due to complications arising from preservational distortion during diagenesis, they were unable to determine the correct size of the queen in life. If the distortion was lateral, then compression to bilateral symmetry yielded an adult length of approximately 3.3 cm (1.3 in), placing it the same range as Formicium berryi and F. brodiei, known only from wings, and suggested as possible males. Conversely stretching the fossil to bilateral symmetry results in a larger 5 cm (2.0 in) length estimate, placing it as comparable to queens of T. lubei and T. simillima.

==== Symphyta ====
Family	Genus	species	Sites	Notes	Images
Cephidae	†Cuspilongus	†Cuspilongus cachecreekensis	McAbee	A cuspilongine cephid sawfly	
Cephidae	Undescribed	"Undescribed	Horsefly	A cephine cephid sawfly Not described to genus/species	
Cimbicidae	†Allenbycimbex	†Allenbycimbex morrisae	Princeton	A cenocimbicine cimbicid sawfly.	
Cimbicidae	†Leptostigma	†Leptostigma alaemacula	Republic	A cenocimbicine cimbicid sawfly.	
Cimbicidae	†Leptostigma	†Leptostigma brevilatum	McAbee; Republic	A cenocimbicine cimbicid sawfly.	Leptostigma brevilatum?
Cimbicidae	†Leptostigma	†Leptostigma fasciatum	McAbee	A cenocimbicine cimbicid sawfly.	
Cimbicidae	†Leptostigma	†Leptostigma longiclava	McAbee	A cenocimbicine cimbicid sawfly.	
Cimbicidae	†Leptostigma	†Leptostigma longipallidum	McAbee	A cenocimbicine cimbicid sawfly.	
Cimbicidae	†Leptostigma	†Leptostigma longitenebricum	McAbee	A cenocimbicine cimbicid sawfly.	
Cimbicidae	†Leptostigma	†Leptostigma proxivena	McAbee	A cenocimbicine cimbicid sawfly.	
Cimbicidae	Unidentified	Unidentified	McAbee	A cimbicid sawfly of indeterminate subfamily.	
Pamphiliidae	†Ulteramus	†Ulteramus republicensis	Republic	A parasitic wasp	
Siricidae	†Eourocerus	†Eourocerus anguliterreus	Republic	A siricid horntail.	Eourocerus anguliterreus
Siricidae	†Ypresiosirex	†Ypresiosirex orthosemos	McAbee	A siricine siricid sawfly	
Tenthredinidae	Eriocampa	†Eriocampa tulameenensis	Princeton	An allantine tenthredinid sawfly	Eriocampa tulameenensis
Tenthredinidae	Pseudosiobla	†Pseudosiobla campbelli	Horsefly	An allantine tenthredinid sawfly	Pseudosiobla campbelli
Tenthredinidae	Undescribed	Undescribed	McAbee	Sawflys of the tenthredinid subfamily Allantinae; Not described	
Tenthredinidae	Undescribed	Undescribed	McAbee	Sawflys of the tenthredinid subfamily Blennocampinae; Not described	
Tenthredinidae	Undescribed	Undescribed	McAbee	Sawflys of the tenthredinid subfamily Nematinae; Not described	
Tenthredinidae	Undescribed	Undescribed	McAbee	Sawflys of the tenthredinid subfamily Tenthredininae; Not described	
Tenthredinidae	Undescribed	Undescribed	Driftwood; Horsefly; McAbee; Quilchena; Republic	Sawflys of the family Tenthredinidae, unplaced to subfamily Not described	

==== Parasitoida ====
Family	Genus	species	Sites	Notes	Images
Braconidae	Bracon	Undescribed	Princeton	A Bracon sensu lato species wasp.	Bracon sp. specimen 69&78 (1890 illustration)
Braconidae	Undescribed	Undescribed	Driftwood; Horsefly; McAbee; Quilchena; Republic	braconid parasitic wasps unplaced to subfamily Not described to genus/species	Unidentified Braconidae
Cynipidae	Undescribed	Undescribed	Princeton; Republic	Trace fossils cynipid Cynipoid gallwasp galling on various host leaves Not described to genus/species	Cynipidae gall on Prunus
Cynipidae (?)	Undescribed	Undescribed	Horsefly; Quilchena	cynipid Cynipoid gallwasps Not described to species	
Diapriidae	Undescribed	Undescribed	Driftwood; Horsefly; McAbee; Republic	diapriid diaprioid wasps Not described to genus/species	
Figitidae	Undescribed	Undescribed	McAbee	figitid cynipoid wasps Not described to genus/species	
Heloridae	Undescribed	Undescribed	McAbee	helorid proctotrupoid wasps Not described	
Ichneumonidae	Xorides	†Xorides lambei	Princeton	A xoridine ichneumon parasitic wasp First described as Xylonomus lambei.	Xorides lambei (1910 illustration)
Ichneumonidae	Undescribed	Undescribed	Driftwood; Horsefly; McAbee; Quilchena; Princeton; Republic	ichneumonid parasitic wasps unplaced to subfamily Not described	Undescribed Ichneumonidae
Megaspilidae	Undescribed	Undescribed	Hat Creek	ceraphronoid Megaspilid parasitic wasps Not described	
Monomachidae	Undescribed	Undescribed	McAbee	monomachid diaprioid wasps Not described	
Peradeniidae	Undescribed	Undescribed	McAbee	peradeniid proctotrupoid wasps Not described	
Proctotrupidae	Undescribed	Undescribed	Driftwood; Horsefly; McAbee; Republic	proctotrupid parasitic wasps Not described	
Roproniidae	Undescribed	Undescribed	Republic	roproniid (sensu lato) proctotrupoid wasps Not described	
incertae sedis	Undescribed	Undescribed	Driftwood; Hat Creek; McAbee	Chalcidoid superfamily wasps Not described to family/genus/species	
incertae sedis	Undescribed	Undescribed	Hat Creek	mymarommatoid microhymenopterans Not described to family/genus/species	

==== Non-apoidean Aculeates ====
Family	Genus	species	Sites	Notes	Images
Chrysididae	Undescribed	Undescribed	McAbee	Chrysidoid wasps of the chrysidid subfamily Chrysidinae; Not described to genus/species	
Pompilidae	Undescribed	Undescribed	McAbee; Republic	pompilid spider wasps Not described	
Scoliidae	Undescribed	Undescribed	Princeton; Republic	Scoliid wasps of the subfamily Archaeoscoliinae; Not described	
Trigonalidae	Undescribed	Undescribed	Falkland; Quilchena	trigonalid parasitic wasps Not described	
Vespidae	Undescribed	Undescribed	Driftwood; McAbee; Princeton; Quilchena; Republic	Vespid wasps Not described	

==== Formicoidea ====
subfamily	Genus	species	Sites	Notes	Images
Dolichoderinae	Dolichoderus	Undescribed	Hat Creek	Dolichoderus species ants. Not described to species	
Dolichoderinae	Undescribed	Undescribed	McAbee	Dolichoderine ants. Not described to genus/species	
Formiciinae	†Titanomyrma	Indeterminate	Princeton	A formiciine titan ant. Unplaced to species	Titianomyrma sp.
Formicinae	†Eoecophylla	†Eoecophylla quilchenensis	Quilchena	A weaver ant related to modern Oecophylla; The most abundant ants at Quilchena	Eoecophylla quilchenensis
Formicinae	Oecophylla	†Oecophylla kraussei	Republic	A weaver ant first described as Camponotites kraussei	Oecophylla kraussei
Formicinae	Indeterminate	indeterminate	McAbee	A weaver ant tribe worker Possibly belonging to either †Eoecophylla or Oecophylla	indeterminate worker
Formicinae	Undescribed	Undescribed	Hat Creek	Formicinae subfamily ants. Not described to species First published as Technomyrmex by Poinar et al., (1999)	
Myrmeciinae	†Avitomyrmex	†Avitomyrmex elongatus	McAbee	A myrmeciine bulldog ant.	
Myrmeciinae	†Avitomyrmex	†Avitomyrmex mastax	McAbee	A myrmeciine bulldog ant.	
Myrmeciinae	†Avitomyrmex	†Avitomyrmex systenus	McAbee	A myrmeciine bulldog ant.	
Myrmeciinae	†Macabeemyrma	†Macabeemyrma ovata	McAbee	A myrmeciine bulldog ant.	
Myrmeciinae	†Myrmeciites	†Myrmeciites? goliath	McAbee	A myrmeciine bulldog ant.	
Myrmeciinae	†Myrmeciites	†Myrmeciites? tabanifluviensis	Horsefly	A myrmeciine bulldog ant.	
Myrmeciinae	†Myrmeciites	†Myrmeciites herculeanus	McAbee	A myrmeciine bulldog ant.	
Myrmeciinae	†Myrmeciites	"Indeterminate"	Falkland; Republic	bull dog ants not distinct to species	Myrmeciities sp.
Myrmeciinae	†Propalosoma	†Propalosoma gutierrezae	Republic	A myrmeciine bulldog ant, first described as a rhopalosomatid wasp.	Propalosoma gutierrezae
Myrmeciinae	†Ypresiomyrma	†Ypresiomyrma bartletti	McAbee	A myrmeciine bulldog ant.	
Myrmeciinae	†Ypresiomyrma	†Ypresiomyrma orbiculata	McAbee	A myrmeciine bulldog ant.	Ypresiomyrma orbiculata
Myrmeciinae	Undescribed	Undescribed	McAbee	Myrmeciinae ants. Not described to species	
Myrmicine	Undescribed	Undescribed	Hat Creek	Myrmicine ants of either Leptothorax or Tetramorium Not described to species	
Incertae sedis	†Klondikia	†Klondikia whiteae	Republic	An ant of uncertain subfamily placement	
Incertae sedis	Undescribed	Undescribed	Driftwood; Hat Creek; Horsefly; McAbee; Princeton; Quilchena; Republic	Ants of uncertain subfamily placement.	Unidentified formicidae

==== Apoidea ====
Family	Genus	species	Sites	Notes	Images
Angarosphecidae	†Eosphecium	†Eosphecium naumanni	Quilchena	A spheciform wasp.	
Angarosphecidae	†Eosphecium	Undescribed	Driftwood; McAbee; Republic	Spheciform wasps. Not described to species	
Angarosphecidae	Undescribed	Undescribed	McAbee; Princeton; Republic	Spheciform wasps, likely not Eosphecium. Not described to species	
Apidae	Undescribed	Undescribed	McAbee	Apid bees Not described to species	
Halictidae (?)	Halictus?	†Halictus? savenyei	Quilchena	A sweat bee of uncertain generic placement	
Halictidae (?)	Undescribed	Undescribed	McAbee; Republic	sweat bees Not described	
Megachilidae	Undescribed	Undescribed	Horsefly; McAbee; Republic	Megachilid leaf-cutter bee herbivory trace fossils on leaves Not described to species	Megachilidae damage on Prunus
Sphecidae	Undescribed	Undescribed	McAbee; Republic	Sphecid (sensu stricto) wasps Not described	

=== Lepidoptera ===
A solitary complete adult female lepidopteran fossil has been recovered, but no full descriptive work has been published on the specimen, aside from a single PhD dissertation. Early examination placed the moth in the family Geometridae, but later work has identified it as the oldest member of the tiger moth subfamily Arctiinae. Two additional isolated wing fossils have been found with one tentatively placed within Noctuidae based on the wing venation and structure, while the second has not been placed beyond order level. Laval mining and hole feeding damage on leaves has been attributed to the families Coleophoridae, Gracillariidae, Heliozelidae, Incurvariidae, and Nepticulidae

Family	Genus	species	Sites	Notes	Images
Coleophoridae	Cf. Coleophora	Undescribed	Republic	Trace fossils Coleophorid hole feeding and larval cases similar to Coleophora; Not described to genus/species	
Erebidae	Undescribed	Undescribed	Republic	An arctiine tiger moth Not described to genus/species	Arctiinae undescribed
Gracillariidae	Undescribed	Undescribed	McAbee	Trace fossils Gracillariid leaf mining similar to Phyllocnistinae subfamily mines Not described to genus/species	
Heliozelidae	Undescribed	Undescribed	Republic	Trace fossils heliozelid leaf mining similar to Antispila mines Not described to genus/species	
Incurvariidae	Aff. Incurvaria	Undescribed	Republic	Trace fossils incurvariid leaf mining similar to Incurvaria; Not described to genus/species	
Nepticulidae	Stigmella	Undescribed	Republic	Trace fossils nepticulid leaf mining referred to Stigmella; Not described to genus/species	
Pyralidae?	Stigmella	Undescribed	Republic	Trace fossils nepticulid leaf mining referred to Stigmella; Not described to genus/species	
Noctuidae	Undescribed	Undescribed	Quilchena	A possible owlet moth Not described to genus/species	
Undescribed	Undescribed	Undescribed	Princeton chert	A lepidopteran forewing Not described to family/genus/species	

=== Mecopterans ===
Family	Genus	species	Sites	Notes	Images
Bittacidae	Undescribed	Undescribed	McAbee	hangingfly specimens Not described to genus/species	
†Cimbrophlebiidae	†Cimbrophlebia	†Cimbrophlebia brooksi	Republic	A Cimbrophlebiid scorpionfly	Cimbrophlebia brooksi
†Cimbrophlebiidae	†Cimbrophlebia	†Cimbrophlebia flabelliformis	McAbee	A Cimbrophlebiid scorpionfly	
†Cimbrophlebiidae	†Cimbrophlebia	†Cimbrophlebia leahyi	McAbee	A Cimbrophlebiid scorpionfly	
†Cimbrophlebiidae	†Cimbrophlebia	†Cimbrophlebia westae	Republic	A Cimbrophlebiid scorpionfly	Cimbrophlebia westae
†Dinopanorpidae	†Dinokanaga	†Dinokanaga andersoni	Republic	A Dinopanorpid scorpion fly	Dinokanaga andersoni
†Dinopanorpidae	†Dinokanaga	†Dinokanaga dowsonae	Falkland; Horsefly; McAbee; Republic	A Dinopanorpid scorpion fly	Dinokanaga dowsonae
†Dinopanorpidae	†Dinokanaga	†Dinokanaga hillsi	McAbee	A Dinopanorpid scorpion fly	
†Dinopanorpidae	†Dinokanaga	†Dinokanaga sternbergi	Republic	A Dinopanorpid scorpion fly	
†Dinopanorpidae	†Dinokanaga	†Dinokanaga webbi	Horsefly	A Dinopanorpid scorpion fly	
†Dinopanorpidae	†Dinokanaga	†Dinokanaga wilsoni	Princeton	A Dinopanorpid scorpion fly	
Eomeropidae	†Eomerope	†Eomerope eonearctica	McAbee	An Eomeropid scorpionfly	
Eomeropidae	†Eomerope	†Eomerope macabeensis	McAbee	An Eomeropid scorpionfly	
Eomeropidae	†Eomerope	†Eomerope simpkinsae	Princeton	An Eomeropid scorpionfly	
†Eorpidae	†Eorpa	†Eorpa elverumi	Republic	An eorpid scorpionfly	Eorpa elverumi
†Eorpidae	†Eorpa	†Eorpa jurgeni	Quilchena	An eorpid scorpionfly	
†Eorpidae	†Eorpa	†Eorpa ypsipeda	Falkland?; McAbee; Republic?	An eorpid scorpionfly	Eorpa sp. possibly E. ypsipeda
†Holcorpidae	†Holcorpa	†Holcorpa dillhoffi	McAbee	A holcorpid scorpionfly	
Panorpidae	Undescribed	Undescribed	McAbee; Republic	Undescribed common scorpionflies Not described to genus/species	

=== Neuropterans ===
Family	Genus	species	Sites	Notes	Images
Berothidae	†Microberotha	†Microberotha macculloughi	Hat Creek	A beaded lacewing	
Chrysopidae	†Adamsochrysa	†Adamsochrysa aspera	McAbee	A nothochrysine green lacewing	
Chrysopidae	†Adamsochrysa	†Adamsochrysa wilsoni	Republic	A nothochrysine green lacewing	Adamsochrysa wilsoni
Chrysopidae	†Archaeochrysa	†Archaeochrysa profracta	McAbee	A nothochrysine green lacewing	
Chrysopidae	†Archaeochrysa	†Archaeochrysa sanikwa	Driftwood	A nothochrysine green lacewing	
Chrysopidae	†Lithochrysa	†Lithochrysa borealis	Driftwood	A nothochrysine green lacewing	
Chrysopidae	†Okanaganochrysa	†Okanaganochrysa coltsunae	McAbee	A nothochrysine green lacewing	
Chrysopidae	†Protochrysa	†Protochrysa fuscobasalis	McAbee	A limaiine green lacewing	
Chrysopidae	†Pseudochrysopa	†Pseudochrysopa harveyi	Driftwood	A nothochrysine green lacewing	
†Corydasialidae	†Ypresioneura	†Ypresioneura obscura	McAbee	A corydasialid lacewing First suggested to be a megalopteran, later deemed a neuropteran.	
Hemerobiidae	†Archibaldia	†Archibaldia wehri	Republic	A hemerobiid lacewing originally placed in †Cretomerobius; Moved to †Proneuronema (2016); Moved to †Archibaldia (2023)	
Hemerobiidae	Wesmaelius	†Wesmaelius mathewesi	Quilchena	A hemerobiine brown lacewing.	
Hemerobiidae	Undescribed	Undescribed	McAbee	Brown lacewing specimens Not described to genus/species	
Ithonidae	†Allorapisma	†Allorapisma chuorum	Republic	An Ithonid group moth lacewing	Allorapisma chuorum
Ithonidae	†Palaeopsychops	†Palaeopsychops barthae	Republic	A polystechotid group moth lacewing	Palaeopsychops barthae
Ithonidae	†Palaeopsychops	†Palaeopsychops dodgeorum	Quilchena	A polystechotid group moth lacewing First mentioned by Archibald & Mathewes 2000 as cf Osmylidae or Polystoechotidae	
Ithonidae	†Palaeopsychops	†Palaeopsychops douglasae	Quilchena	A polystechotid group moth lacewing	
Ithonidae	†Palaeopsychops	†Palaeopsychops goodwini	Republic	A polystechotid group moth lacewing	Palaeopsychops goodwini
Ithonidae	†Palaeopsychops	†Palaeopsychops marringerae	Republic	A polystechotid group moth lacewing	Palaeopsychops marringerae
Ithonidae	†Palaeopsychops	†Palaeopsychops setosus	Horsefly	A polystechotid group moth lacewing	
Ithonidae	†Palaeopsychops	†Palaeopsychops timmi	Republic	A polystechotid group moth lacewing	Palaeopsychops timmi
Ithonidae	†Palaeopsychops	†Palaeopsychops sp. indet	McAbee	A polystechotid group moth lacewing Too poorly preserved to assign to species.	Palaeopsychops sp. indet.
Ithonidae	†Polystoechotites	†Polystoechotites barksdalae	Republic	A polystechotid group moth lacewing	Polystoechotites barksdalae
Ithonidae	†Polystoechotites	†Polystoechotites falcatus	Republic	A polystechotid group moth lacewing	Polystoechotites falcatus
Ithonidae	†Polystoechotites	†Polystoechotites lewisi	Republic	A polystechotid group moth lacewing	Polystoechotites lewisi
Ithonidae	†Ricaniella	†Ricaniella antiquata	Princeton	A Polystoechotid-group moth lacewing moved from Ricania antiquata (1895)	Ricaniella antiquata (1895 illustration)
Ithonidae	Undescribed	Undescribed	McAbee	Polystoechotid-group moth lacewings Not described to genus/species	
Nymphidae	†Epinesydrion	†Epinesydrion falklandensis	Falkland	A split-footed lacewing, possibly sister species to †Nymphes georgei	
Nymphidae	Nymphes	†Nymphes(?) georgei	Republic	A split-footed lacewing Possibly related to Epinesydrion	Nymphes georgei
Osmylidae	†Osmylidia	†Osmylidia donnae	Quilchena	A protosmyline osmylid lacewing	
Osmylidae	†Osmylidia	†Osmylidia glastrai	Republic	A protosmyline osmylid lacewing	
Osmylidae	†Osmylidia	Indeterminate	Driftwood	A protosmyline osmylid lacewing, not detailed enough for species description	
Osmylidae	Undescribed	Undescribed	McAbee	osmylid lacewing specimens Not described to genus/species	
Psychopsidae?	†Ainigmapsychops	†Ainigmapsychops inexspectatus	Republic	A possible psychopsid lacewing	Ainigmapsychops inexspectatus
Undescribed	Undescribed	Undescribed	McAbee	Members of an undescribed neuropteran family	

=== Odonata ===
Trace fossil evidence of damselflies has been recorded from oviposition scars on various leaves from the Klondike Mountain Formation that have been placed in the ichnogenus Paleoovoidus. Lewis and Carrol (1991) originally identified the damage on an Alnus parvifolia leaf as caused by leaf beetles of the genus Altica. This was later questioned by Conrad Labandeira who noted the scar patterns did not match modern Altica egg laying behaviour.

Family	Genus	species	Sites	Notes	Images
Aeshnidae	†Antiquiala	†Antiquiala snyderae	Republic	A darner dragonfly	Antiquiala snyderae
Aeshnidae	†Eoshna	†Eoshna thompsonensis	McAbee	A darner dragonfly	
Aeshnidae	†Idemlinea	†Idemlinea versatilis	Republic	A darner dragonfly	Idemlinea versatilis
Aeshnidae	†Ypshna	†Ypshna brownleei	Republic	A darner dragonfly	Ypshna brownleei
Aeshnidae	†Ypshna	†Ypshna latipennata	McAbee	A darner dragonfly	
†Dysagrionidae	†Dysagrion	†Dysagrion pruettae	Republic	A Dysagrionine cephalozygopteran odonate	Dysagrion pruettae
†Dysagrionidae	†Dysagrionites	†Dysagrionites allenbyensis	Princeton	A probable dysagrionine cephalozygopteran odonate	Dysagrionites allenbyensis
†Dysagrionidae	†Dysagrionites	†Dysagrionites delinei	Republic	A probable dysagrionine cephalozygopteran odonate	Dysagrionites delinei
†Dysagrionidae	†Okanagrion	†Okanagrion angustum	McAbee	A Dysagrionine cephalozygopteran odonate	
†Dysagrionidae	†Okanagrion	†Okanagrion beardi	McAbee	A Dysagrionine cephalozygopteran odonate	
†Dysagrionidae	†Okanagrion	†Okanagrion dorrellae	Republic	A Dysagrionine cephalozygopteran odonate	Okanagrion dorrellae
†Dysagrionidae	†Okanagrion	†Okanagrion hobani	McAbee; Republic	A Dysagrionine cephalozygopteran odonate	Okanagrion hobani
†Dysagrionidae	†Okanagrion	†Okanagrion liquetoalatum	Republic	A Dysagrionine cephalozygopteran odonate	Okanagrion liquetoalatum
†Dysagrionidae	†Okanagrion	†Okanagrion lochmum	McAbee	A Dysagrionine cephalozygopteran odonate	
†Dysagrionidae	†Okanagrion	†Okanagrion threadgillae	Republic	A Dysagrionine cephalozygopteran odonate	Okanagrion threadgillae
†Dysagrionidae	†Okanagrion	†Okanagrion worleyae	Republic	A Dysagrionine cephalozygopteran odonate	Okanagrion worleyae
†Dysagrionidae	†Okanopteryx	†Okanopteryx fraseri	McAbee	A Dysagrionine cephalozygopteran odonate	
†Dysagrionidae	†Okanopteryx	†Okanopteryx jeppesenorum	Republic	A Dysagrionine cephalozygopteran odonate	Okanopteryx jeppesenorum
†Dysagrionidae	†Okanopteryx	†Okanopteryx macabeensis	McAbee	A Dysagrionine cephalozygopteran odonate	
†Dysagrionidae	†Paradysagrion	†Paradysagrion sosbyae	Republic	A dysagrionid cephalozygopteran odonate	Paradysagrion sosbyae
†Dysagrionidae	†Stenodiafanus	†Stenodiafanus westersidei	Republic	A Dysagrionine cephalozygopteran odonate	Stenodiafanus westersidei
Cf. †Dysagrionidae	†Allenbya	†Allenbya holmesae	Princeton	A possible Dysagrionidae odonate. Not to be confused with the Princeton Chert waterlily Allenbya	Allenbya holmesae
†Eodichromatidae	†Labandeiraia	†Labandeiraia burlingameae	Princeton	An Eodichromatid Cephalozygopteran odonate.	
†Eodichromatidae	†Republica	†Republica weatbrooki	Republic	First described as a gossamerwing damselfly. Moved to Eodichromatidae in 2025. Not to be confused Republica, a plant genus also from Republic	Republica weatbrooki
Gomphidae	†Auroradraco	†Auroradraco eos	McAbee	A club-tailed dragonfly	
†Whetwhetaksidae	†Whetwhetaksa	†Whetwhetaksa millerae	Republic	A possible cephalozygopteran odonate	Whetwhetaksa millerae

=== Orthoptera ===
Family	Genus	species	Sites	Notes	Images
Acrididae	Unidentified	Unidentified	McAbee	Catanopine short-horned grasshopper specimens Not described to genus/species	
Gryllacrididae?	Unidentified	Unidentified	McAbee	Possible leaf-rolling cricket specimens Not described to genus/species	
†Promastacidae	†Promastax	†Promastax archaicus	Horsefly	A Promastacid grasshopper	Promastax archaicus (1910 illustration)
†Palaeorehniidae	†Republicopteron	†Republicopteron douseae	Republic	A palaeorehniid ensiferan.	Republicopteron douseae
†Palaeorehniidae	†Ypopteron	†Ypopteron nicola	Quilchena	A palaeorehniid ensiferan. First identified as a prophalangopsine grig	
Prophalangopsidae	Unidentified	Unidentified	McAbee	grig specimens Not described to genus/species	
Tettigoniidae	Unidentified	Unidentified	McAbee	katydid specimens Not described to genus/species	

=== Phasmatodea ===
Family	Genus	species	Sites	Notes	Images
Susumaniidae	†Eoprephasma	†Eoprephasma hichensi	McAbee; Republic	A Susumaniine susumanioid stick insect	

=== Plecoptera ===
Family	Genus	species	Sites	Notes	Images
Unidentified	Unidentified	Unidentified	McAbee	stonefly specimens Not described to family/genus/species	

=== Psocodea ===
The only reported Psocodea fossils from the highlands are known from Hat Creek amber. They were mentioned, as "Psocoptera", in passing by Poinar et al. (1999) who did not give any finer taxonomic detail or illustrate any specimens.

Family	Genus	species	Sites	Notes	Images
Unidentified	Unidentified	Unidentified	Hat Creek	specimens in amber Not described to genus/species	

=== Raphidiopterans ===
Family	Genus	species	Sites	Notes	Images
Inocelliidae	†Paraksenocellia	†Paraksenocellia borealis	Driftwood	An inocelliid snakefly	
Raphidiidae	†Archiinocellia	†Archiinocellia oligoneura	Horsefly	A Raphidiid snakefly	Archiinocellia oligoneura
Raphidiidae	†Megaraphidia	†Megaraphidia antiquissima	McAbee	A Raphidiid snakefly	
Raphidiidae	†Megaraphidia	†Megaraphidia hopkinsi	Princeton	A Raphidiid snakefly	
Raphidiidae	†Megaraphidia	†Megaraphidia klondika	Republic	A raphidiid snakefly	
Raphidiidae	†Megaraphidia	†Megaraphidia ootsa	Driftwood	A raphidiid snakefly	

=== Thrysanoptera ===
Poinar et al. (1999) illustrated a Thrips specimen in Hat Creek amber and noted the presence of the order in the fossils they examined, however they did not provide any finer taxonomic details on the affinities of the fossils.

Family	Genus	species	Sites	Notes	Images
Unidentified	Unidentified	Unidentified	Hat Creek	specimens in amber Not described to genus/species	

=== Trichoptera ===
Trichopterans are known mainly from laraval cases and occasional isolated wings.

Family	Genus	species	Sites	Notes	Images
Limnephilidae	Unidentified	unidentified	Republic	northern caddisflies Not described to genus/species	
Phryganeidae	Unidentified	Unidentified	Quilchena; Republic	giant caddisflies Not described to genus/species	Phryganeidae larval case
Unidentified	Unidentified	Unidentified	Driftwood; Horsefly; McAbee; Quilchena	Isolated wings and larval cases Not described to genus/species	

== Vertebrates ==
=== "Fish" ===
The first fish to be described from the Okanagan Highlands were recovered from Allenby Formation shales and subsequently studied by Edward Drinker Cope who named Amyzon brevipinne in 1894. The next descriptive work for a fish came in 1916 with the naming of "Lucious" rosei by Louis Hussakof from Tranquille Formation fossils collected at "Red point" on Kamloops Lake in 1914. "Lucious" rosei was redescribed in 1966 by Ted Cavander, who moved the species to a new genus Eohiodon placed into the mooneye family Hiodontidae. The largest body of work for fish of the Highlands was by Mark Wilson (1977) who published a monograph detailing the Canadian highlands formations fish fauna, naming four new species in three new genera, plus redescribing both "Amyzon" brevipinne and "Eohiodon" rosei. The monograph added the families Salmonidae with Eosalmo driftwoodensis, Libotoniidae with Libotonius blakeburnensis, and Moronidae with Priscacara aquilonia. A year later the first species from the Republic area, "Eohiodon" woodruffi was described by Wilson, and the second Republic species Libotonius pearsoni followed in 1979. in 1982 the final new fish species named from the highlands, Amia hesperia, was described, being initially placed by Wilson in the modern bowfin genus Amia. This placement was later questioned by Lance Grande and William Bemis (1998), who noted that due to preservational orientation of the A. hesperia holotype, generic placement of the species was problematic. Phylogenetic analysis of Amiidae fossils by Grande and Bemis found the fossil as a member of the amiinae subfamily, but with key mouth anatomy missing, were unable to determine if Amia or the extinct genus Cyclurus was correct. In 2021 fossils of "Amyzon" brevipinne were redescribed by Juan Liu based on the holotype and additional fossils from the Allenby Formation, and based on the anatomical differences between the species and the type species of Amyzon mentale determined that the Princeton fossils were part of a different genus. As such Liu moved the species to the new genus Wilsonium.

Family	Genus	species	Sites	Notes	Images
Amiidae	Amia?	†Amia? hesperia	Princeton	A bowfin of uncertain genus placement	
Amiidae	Amia?	†Amia? hesperia?	Driftwood; Princeton; Quilchena; Republic	isolated bowfin scales	Amia? scale
Catostomidae	†Amyzon	†Amyzon aggregatum	Horsefly; Republic?	A sucker	
Catostomidae	†Amyzon	Unidentified	Driftwood; McAbee; Republic	A sucker Republic specimens formerly identified as A. aggregatum	Amyzon sp.
Catostomidae	†Wilsonium	†Wilsonium brevipinne	Princeton	A catostomid sucker, first described as Amyzon brevipinne (1894); Moved to Wilsonium brevipinne in 2021	
Catostomidae	†Wilsonium	Cf. †Wilsonium brevipinne	Quilchena	A catostomid sucker, Not described to species similar to Wilsonium brevipinne	
Hiodontidae	Hiodon	†Hiodon rosei	Horsefly; Kamloops Lake; McAbee; Princeton	A mooneye, first described as Lucious rosei (1916), Moved to Eohiodon rosei in 1966, Moved to Hiodon rosei in 2008	
Hiodontidae	Hiodon	†Hiodon woodruffi	Horsefly; Republic	A mooneye, first described as Eohiodon woodruffi. Moved to Hiodon woodruffi in 2008	Hiodon woodruffi
Hiodontidae	Hiodon	Unidentified	Quilchena	A mooneye jaw. Not identified to species	
Moronidae	†Priscacara	†Priscacara aquilonia	Horsefly	A temperate bass	
Percopsidae	†Libotonius	†Libotonius blakeburnensis	Princeton	A sand roller relative.	
Percopsidae	†Libotonius	†Libotonius pearsoni	Republic	A sand roller relative.	Libotonius pearsoni
Salmonidae	†Eosalmo	†Eosalmo driftwoodensis	Driftwood Canyon; McAbee; Princeton; Republic	A basal Salmon	Eosalmo driftwoodensis
Salmonidae	†Eosalmo	Cf. †Eosalmo driftwoodensis	Quilchena	A basal Salmon; Not described to species Similar to E. driftwoodensis	

=== Reptiles ===
The only reptile fossils known from the Okanagan highlands come from the Allenby Formation. A soft-shelled turtle is known from the "Ashnola shales" unit and unidentified turtle bone are known from the interbedded Princeton Chert. The soft shelled turtle was first discovered by James Basinger from dark shale layers above the chert and reported by Wilson (1982). The unidentified turtle bones were found preserved within the chert layers and first reported by Stockey and Pigg (1994). In his 1995 Masters thesis, G. Guthrie listed an isolated tooth from the Quilchena site as from a crocodile, which would have been the only instance of a crocodylian in the highlands. The taxonomic affinity was later revised after further examination and Mathewes et al. (2016) listed the specimen as an unidentified fish tooth.

Family	Genus	species	Sites	Notes	Images
Trionychidae	Cf. Apalone or Aspideretes	undescribed	Princeton	A soft shelled turtle Found in the Ashnola shales over the chert	
Undescribed	Undescribed	undescribed	Princeton chert	A turtle, Bones preserved in the Princeton Chert	

=== Birds ===
A small avifauna is known from the Okanagan Highlands, but due to the incomplete nature of the fossils, placement of studied specimens has been tentative at best. Gerald Mayr et al. (2019) published an initial overview of the fossils with descriptions and commentary of the material, noting the taxa identified were all previously unknown to Northwestern North American Eocene sites. Despite the tentative nature of the fossil identifications, the Highlands sites are the richest Paleogene avifauna described from Canada. Mayr et al. (2019) posited that the fossils likely represent the more common species in the avifauna of the Highlands, but at the same time, include taxa that are considered rare or absent in the most studied avifaunas from the same time frame. Additional evidence of birds at some sites consists of preserved egested bird pellets, which are composed of randomly grouped fish bone clumps, occasionally including multiple fish or insects.

Isolated feathers are also known from several of the sites and have not described in detail.

Order/Clade	Family	Material	Sites	Notes	Images
Cf. Coliiformes	indeterminate	partial skeleton skull, left wing, and right wing portions	Driftwood	a large possible Coliiform, too incomplete for firm identification	
Cf. Gaviiformes	indeterminate	left wing and partial right wing, with feathers	McAbee	a possible gaviiform, too incomplete for firm identification	
Gruiformes	Cf. †Songziidae	articulated postcranial skeleton	Driftwood	A possible songziid bird, lacking specific morphologic characters for a firm placement.	
Psittacopasserae	Cf. †Zygodactylidae	complete, but poorly preserved, skeleton	McAbee	a possible zygodactylid, poor preservation of the foot prevented firm identification	
indeterminate	indeterminate	partial skeletons	McAbee; Princeton; Republic	partial skeletons missing details for identification. Republic specimen shows unique cranial pitting.	Indeterminate skeleton McAbee site
indeterminate	indeterminate	feathers	Horsefly; McAbee; Quilchena; Republic	isolated feathers	unidentified feather, Republic

=== Mammals ===
Eocene mammals are exclusively known from sites in, or possibly in, the Okanagan Highlands. The earliest reported mammals were of teeth from the Princeton area in 1935, with one of the fossils subsequently being "lost". More recent work in 2014 and 2017 on fossils from Driftwood and Princeton have expanded the mammal families to three, possibly four, and an undescribed Quilchena fossil being identified as a "lipotyphla". The record of Brontotheriidae is uncertain due to the split opinion regarding inclusion of the Quesnel area sediments as part of the Highlands.

Family	Genus	species	Sites	Notes	Images
Erinaceidae	†Silvacola	†Silvacola acares	Driftwood	A hedgehog and moonrat relative	
Erinaceidae	†Entomolestes	undescribed	Princeton	An unidentified hedgehog relative, specimen possibly lost.	
Esthonychidae	†Trogosus	†Trogosus latidens	Princeton	A tillodont species	
Esthonychidae	†Trogosus	†Trogosus sp.	Princeton	An indeterminate tillodont smaller than T. latidens	Trogosus hyracoides reconstruction
†Helaletidae	Cf. †Heptodon	indeterminate	Driftwood	A helaletid tapir relative.	Heptodon posticus reconstruction
undescribed	undescribed	undescribed	Quilchena	A "lipotyphlan"	

== Trace fossils ==
Pellets of fish bone and other animal material which were likely eaten by larger predators and then regurgitated have been reported from the Quilchena and Republic sites. These traces, called regurgitalites, have so far been understudied, with only a few passing mentions in Okanagan highlands literature.

== Quesnelian fauna ==
If the Quesnel sites are included as part of the Greater Okanagan Highlands per Archibald et al. (2018) the fauna of the region is expanded by a number of insect taxa, an additional arachnid, and a brontothere.

=== Quesnelian Arachnids ===
Family	Genus	species	Sites	Notes	Images
Araneae	†Araneaovoius	†Araneaovoius columbiae	Quesnel	An orb-web spider egg sack. First described as "Aranea" columbiae (1878)	Araneaovoius columbiae (1890 illustration)

=== Quesnelian Coleopterans ===
Family	Genus	species	Sites	Notes	Images
Nitidulidae	Prometopia	†Prometopia depilis	Quesnel	A sap beetle	Prometopia depilis (1890 illustration)

=== Quesnelian Dipterans ===
Family	Genus	species	Sites	Notes	Images
Anthomyiidae	Anthomyia	†Anthomyia burgessi	Quesnel	An anthomyiid fly. Considered nomen dubium without discussion by Michelsen (1996).	Anthomyia burgessi (1890 illustration)
Anthomyiidae	Anthomyia	†Anthomyia inanimata	Quesnel	An anthomyiid fly. Considered nomen dubium without discussion by Michelsen (1996).	Anthomyia inanimata (1890 illustration)
Asilidae	Undescribed	Undescribed	Quesnel	An undescribed robber fly	
Dolichopodidae	Dolichopus	Undescribed	Quesnel	An undescribed long-legged fly.	Dolichopus sp. specimen 14651 (1890 illustration)
Heleomyzidae	Heteromyza	†Heteromyza senilis	Quesnel	A heleomyzid fly.	Heteromyza senilis (1890 illustration)
Lauxaniidae	"Lonchaea"	†"Lonchaea" senescens	Quesnel	A lauxaniid fly. First placed in Lonchaea; Referred to Lauxaniidae without redescription.(1994)	"Lonchaea" senescens (1890 illustration)
Mycetophilidae	Boletina	†Boletina sepulta	Quesnel	A fungus gnat.	Boletina sepulta (1890 illustration)
Mycetophilidae	Brachypeza	†Brachypeza abita	Quesnel	A mycetophiline fungus gnat.	Brachypeza abita (1890 illustration)
Mycetophilidae	Brachypeza	†Brachypeza procera	Quesnel	A mycetophiline fungus gnat.	Brachypeza procera (1890 illustration)
Mycetophilidae	Trichonta	†Trichonta dawsoni	Quesnel	A mycetophiline fungus gnat.	Trichonta dawsoni (1890 illustration)
Pallopteridae	Palloptera	†Palloptera morticina	Quesnel	A flutter-wing fly.	Palloptera morticina (1890 illustration)
Sciaridae	Sciara	†Sciara deperdita	Quesnel	A sciarine dark-winged fungus gnat.	Sciara deperdita (1890 illustration)
Sciomyzidae	Sciomyza	†Sciomyza revelata	Quesnel	A marsh fly.	Sciomyza revelata (1890 illustration)
Ulidiidae	†Lithortalis	†Lithortalis picta	Quesnel	A picture-winged fly.	Lithortalis picta (1890 illustration)

=== Quesnelian Hemipterans ===
Family	Genus	species	Sites	Notes	Images
Pentatomidae	†Teleoschistus	†Teleoschistus antiquus	Quesnel	A shield bug first described as "Euschistus" antiquus (1878).	Teleoschistus antiquus (1890 illustration)
Incertae sedis	†Geranchon	†Geranchon petrorum	Quesnel	An aphidomorph of uncertain placement First described as "Lachnus" petrorum (1877)	Geranchon petrorum (1890 illustration)
incertae sedis	†Sbenaphis	†Sbenaphis quesneli	Quesnel	An aphidoid of uncertain placement First described as "Lachnus" quesneli	Sbenaphis quesneli (1890 illustration)

=== Quesnelian Hymenopterans ===
Family	Genus	species	Sites	Notes	Images
Formicidae	Aphaenogaster	†Aphaenogaster longaeva	Quesnel	A myrmicine ant, possibly nomen dubium.	Aphaenogaster longaeva (1890 illustration)
Formicidae	†Calyptites	†Calyptites antediluvianum	Quesnel	An ant of uncertain placement.	Calyptites antediluvianum (1890 illustration)
Formicidae	Dolichoderus	†Dolichoderus obliteratus	Quesnel	A dolichoderine ant First described as "Hypoclinea" obliterata	Dolichoderus obliteratus (1890 illustration)
Formicidae	Formica	†Formica arcana	Quesnel	A formicine ant	Formica arcana (1890 illustration)
Ichneumonidae	Pimpla	†Pimpla decessa	Quesnel	A pimpline ichneumon parasitic wasp	Pimpla decessa (1890 illustration)
Ichneumonidae	Pimpla	†Pimpla saxea	Quesnel	A pimpline ichneumon parasitic wasp	Pimpla saxea (1890 illustration)
Ichneumonidae	Pimpla	†Pimpla senecta	Quesnel	A pimpline ichneumon parasitic wasp	Pimpla senecta (1890 illustration)

=== Quesnelian Neuroptera ===
Family	Genus	species	Sites	Notes	Images
Hemerobiidae	†Bothromicromus	†Bothromicromus lachlani	Quesnel	A hemerobiid lacewing of uncertain subfamily placement	Bothromicromus lachlani (1890 illustration)

=== Quesnelian Mammals ===
Family	Genus	species	Sites	Notes	Images
Brontotheriidae	indeterminate	indeterminate	Quesnel	A Brontotheriina subtribe Brontothere; Not identifiable to genus Known from isolated teeth	
