= Eorpa =

Eorpa may refer to:

- Eòrpa, a BBC Scotland current affairs programme
- Eorpa (insect), an extinct scorpionfly genus
