= CYP15 family =

Group of cytochrome P450 enzymes

Cytochrome P450, family 15, also known as CYP15, is an animal cytochrome P450 family found in insect genome, involved in juvenile hormone biosynthesis. The first gene identified in this family is the DpCYP15A1 from the Diploptera punctata (Pacific beetle cockroach), encodes an epoxidase of methyl farnesoate, a precursor of juvenile hormone, alone with its ortholog TcCYP15A1 in Tribolium castaneum (red flour beetle).
