= Konrad Thaler =

Austrian arachnologist (1940–2005)

Konrad Thaler (born 19 December 1940 in Innsbruck, Austria – died 11 June 2005) was an Austrian arachnologist.

Peter J. Schwendinger, other Austrian arachnologist, studied with Konrad Thaler, in Innsbruck University.

== Tributes ==
The specific epithet of the spider species Palaeoperenethis thaleri was designated by P. Selden and D. Penney in honor of the late Dr. Konrad Thaler, past president of the International Society of Arachnology.
