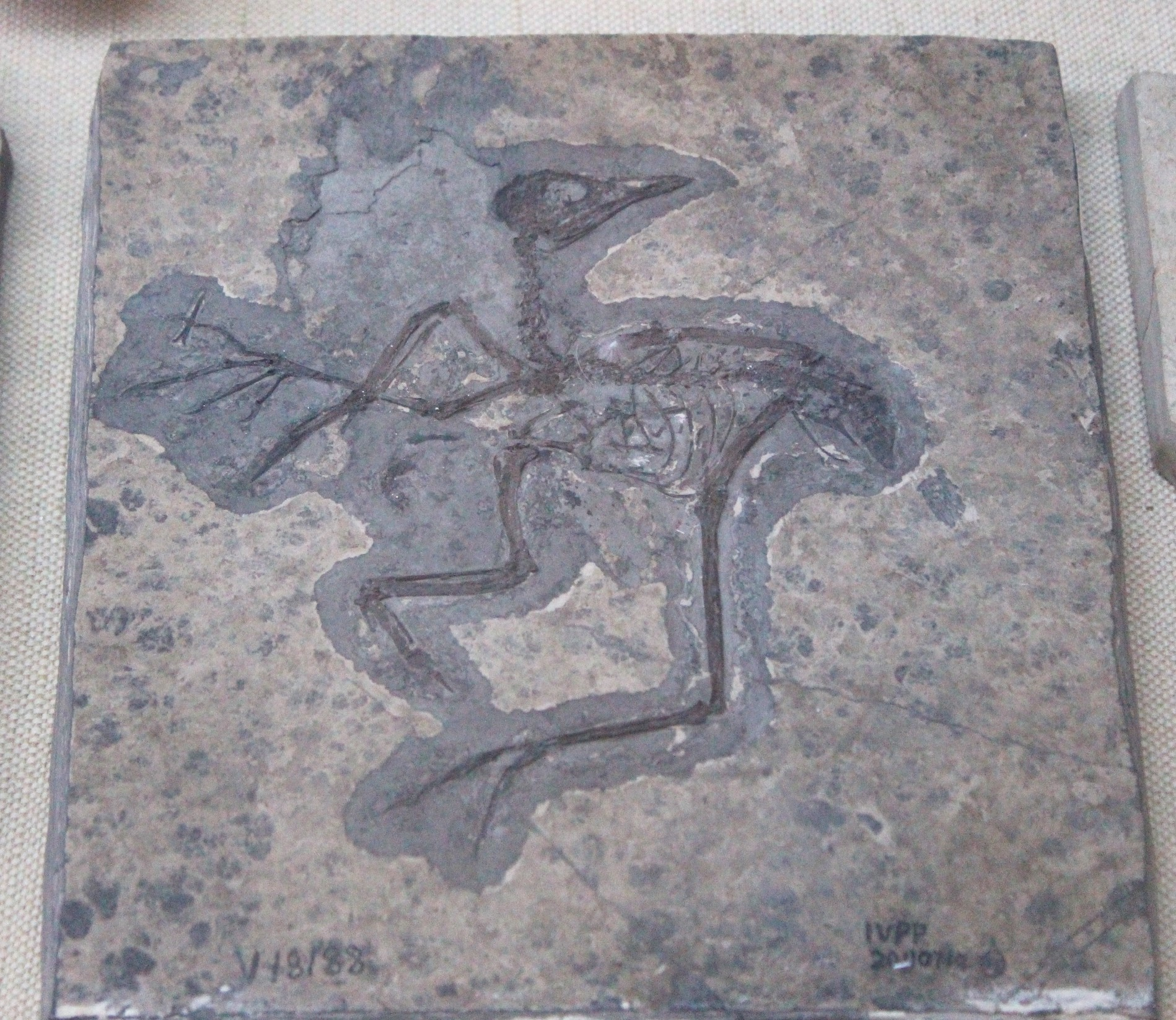
- Holotype (IVPP V18188) of S. acutunguis, Paleozoological Museum of China

Scientific classification
- Kingdom: Animalia
- Phylum: Chordata
- Class: Aves
- Order: Gruiformes
- Family: †Songziidae; Hou, 1990
- Genus: †Songzia; Hou, 1990

Type species
- Songzia heidangkouensis Hou, 1990

Species
- S. heidangkouensis Hou, 1990; S. acutunguis Wang et al., 2012

= Songzia =

Songzia Temporal range: Paleocene -Eocene

Extinct genus of birds

Songzia is an extinct genus of gruiform bird related to rails. It lived in the Eocene epoch. Though many families traditionally assigned to the Gruiformes do not seem to actually belong there, this is apparently not the case with this animal. Its fossils have been found in Songzi county (Hubei Province People's Republic of China).

Two species are known and have been named Songzia heidangkouensis and Songzia acutunguis. The genus and family names for the type species were originally first published in a newsletter, and only subsequently in a scientific journal to fulfill the ICZN's requirements valid new scientific names. As such, they were considered nomina nuda until the journal article was published for validation of the taxonomic acts. An additional fossil found in the Driftwood site avifauna of the Eocene Okanagan Highlands was tentatively referred the to family, as has a fossil from the Paleocene Menat Formation
