= Cuspilongus =

Cuspilongus Temporal range: Aptian–Eocene

Scientific classification
- Kingdom: Animalia
- Phylum: Arthropoda
- Clade: Pancrustacea
- Class: Insecta
- Order: Hymenoptera
- Family: Cephidae
- Subfamily: †Cuspilonginae; Kopylov & Rasnitsyn, 2016
- Genus: †Cuspilongus; Archibald & Rasnitsyn, 2015

Species
- Cuspilongus cachecreekensis Archibald & Rasnitsyn, 2015; Cuspilongus ghilarovi (Rasnitsyn, 1988)

Synonyms
- C. ghilarovi synonymy: Mesocephus ghilarovi Rasnitsyn, 1988

Extinct genus of wasp

Cuspilongus is an extinct genus of symphytan wasps in the sawfly family Cephidae and the only genus in the subfamily Cuspilonginae. At the time of its description, the genus comprised a single species, Cuspilongus cachecreekensis. A second species, Cuspilongus ghilarovi, was transferred from Mesocephus, which it had been ascribed to at the time of description in 1988. The genus is known from fossils found in the Early Cretaceous of Mongolia and Early Eocene of Canada.

== History and classification ==
The genus Cuspilongus was described by paleoentomologists S. Bruce Archibald from Simon Fraser University in Burnaby, British Columbia and Alexandr Rasnitsyn of the A. A. Borissiak Paleontological Institute, who published the 2015 genus description in the journal Canadian Entomologist. The genus name Cuspilongus was coined by Archibald and Rasnitsyn as a combination of the Latin words cuspis which means "lance" and longus meaning long, in reference to the notable length of the type species ovipositor. The type species was designated Cuspilongus cachecreekensis by monotypy, as it was the only species placed in the genus at that time. C. cachecreekensis was based on the part and counterpart holotype, specimen numbers F-1545 & F-1546, housed in the collections of the Thompson Rivers University in Kamloops, British Columbia. The specific epithet cachecreekensis was chosen in honor of the town of Cache Creek, British Columbia, 8 km (5.0 mi) west of the type locality for the type species. Cuspilongus cachecreekensis was one of three sawfly species described in Archibald & Rasnitsyn's 2015 paper, the other two being Ulteramus republicensis and Ypresiosirex orthosemos, from the Klondike Mountain Formation and the McAbee fossil beds respectively.

Alexandr Rasnitsyn (1988) had described the species Mesocephus ghilarovi based on the holotype PIN 3559/652 female fossil, part of the Paleontological Institute, Russian Academy of Sciences collections. The placement was not challenged until redescription of the specimen by D.S. Kopylov and Rasnitsyn (2016). When described in 1988 the specimen was not fully prepared, having matrix still covering the abdomen and ovipositor. After being fully prepped in 2015, the fossil was noted to be very similar in morphology and wing venation to the then described C. cachecreekensis and moved to Cuspilongus accordingly.

In the type description for Cuspilongus, Archibald and Rasnitsyn opted to include it in the living Cephidae subfamily Cephinae based on the darkened intercostal wing area and the downward curved to the ovipositor sheath. Based on the two species, Kopylov and Rasnitsyn moved Cuspilongus to a new monotypic subfamily Cuspilonginae which they based on the ovipositor being nearly as long as the forewing, with a curved robust sabre-shape. Living members of the family have ovipositors that are only up to half the length of the forewing.

== Distribution ==
Cuspilongus cachecreekensis was recovered from outcrops of the early Eocene, Ypresian McAbee Fossil Beds near Cache Creek, British Columbia, which is part of the Eocene Okanagan Highlands running from Central British Columbia southeastward to northeast central Washington state.

Cuspilongus ghilarovi is only known from the Cretaceous Bon-Tsagan site in Mongolia. Located 5–8 km (5,000–8,000 m) south of Böön Tsagaan Lake in the Gobi Desert, Bon-Tsagan is a outcrop of the Dzun-Bain Formations Khurilt Member dated to be Aptian.

== Paleoecology ==
The unnamed formation outcropping at the McAbee Fossil Beds preserve an upland temperate flora that was first interpreted as being Microthermal, although further study has shown them to be more mesothermal in nature. The plant community preserved in the McAbee Fossil Beds site is mostly broadleaf pollen with alder and elm dominating, and may represent a successional forest involving multiple volcanic ash eruptions. The broader Eocene Okanagan Highlands likely had a mesic upper microthermal to lower mesothermal climate, in which winter temperatures rarely dropped low enough for snow, and which were seasonably equitable. The Okanagan Highlands paleoforest surrounding the lakes have been described as precursors to the modern temperate broadleaf and mixed forests of Eastern North America and Eastern Asia. Based on the paleofloral and paleofaunal biotas, the lakes were higher and cooler than the coeval coastal forests preserved in the Puget Group and Chuckanut Formation of Western Washington, which are described as lowland tropical forest ecosystems. Estimates of the paleoelevation range between 0.7–1.2 km (0.43–0.75 mi) higher than the coastal forests. This is consistent with the paleoelevation estimates for the lake systems, which range between 1.1–2.9 km (1,100–2,900 m), which is similar to the modern elevation 0.8 km (0.50 mi), but higher.

== Description ==
=== C. cachecreekensis ===
The single described female of C. cachecreekensis is mostly complete, missing the legs entirely, with the antennae preserved in disarticulated segments, and portions of the abdomen are obscured. The female has a body length of approximately 14 mm (0.55 in) and an overall preserved length of 25 mm (0.98 in) with the ovipositor included. The head and thorax are dark in coloration, while the abdomen is light colored in the preserved and visible areas. Similarly the wings are lightly colored to hyaline, with the exception of the intercostal space, which is notably darkened. The abdomen is damaged but the ovipositor is preserved well, being about 11 mm (0.43 in) long with part of the sheath preserved, with both the ovipositor and sheath showing a downward curve.

=== C. ghilarovi ===
The C. ghilarovi is also a partially complete female, missing the head and most of the hindwings, while the abdomen and legs are damaged. Due to the missing head and damage to the abdomen a total body length of was not given, but the overall size is noted to be smaller than C. cachecreekensis The body and legs are dark in coloration. Similarly the wings are lightly colored to hyaline, with the exception of the intercostal space, which is notably darkened. The ovipositor is about 9.7 mm (0.38 in) long and 0.87 mm (0.034 in) wide at its thickest. The 1r-rs and 2r-rs crossveins of the forewing are located slightly more apicially than those of C. cachecreekensis.
