= Antiquiala =

Antiquiala Temporal range: Early Eocene (Ypresian)51.3–49 Ma
- holotype wing

Scientific classification
- Kingdom: Animalia
- Phylum: Arthropoda
- Clade: Pancrustacea
- Class: Insecta
- Order: Odonata
- Infraorder: Anisoptera
- Family: Aeshnidae
- Genus: †Antiquiala
- Species: †A. snyderae

Binomial name
- †Antiquiala snyderae Archibald & Cannings, 2019

Genus of dragonflies

Antiquiala is an extinct anisopteran genus in the dragonfly family Aeshnidae with a single described species, Antiquiala snyderae. The species is solely known from the Early Eocene sediments exposed in the northeast of the U.S. state of Washington. The single fossil known was found at the "Boot Hill" site in Republic and added to the Stonerose Interpretive Center research collection before being officially described in 2019. The genus is thought to be most similar to another early Eocene genus, Huncoaeshna, which was recovered from the Laguna del Hunco Formation in South America.

== Distribution ==
The lone Antiquiala snyderae fossil was recovered from a single site in the Eocene Okanagan Highlands of Central British Columbia and northeast central Washington state. The described specimen is from the Klondike Mountain Formation in Northern Ferry County, Washington, being recovered from the "Boot Hill" site B4131 in Republic, Washington.

== History and classification ==
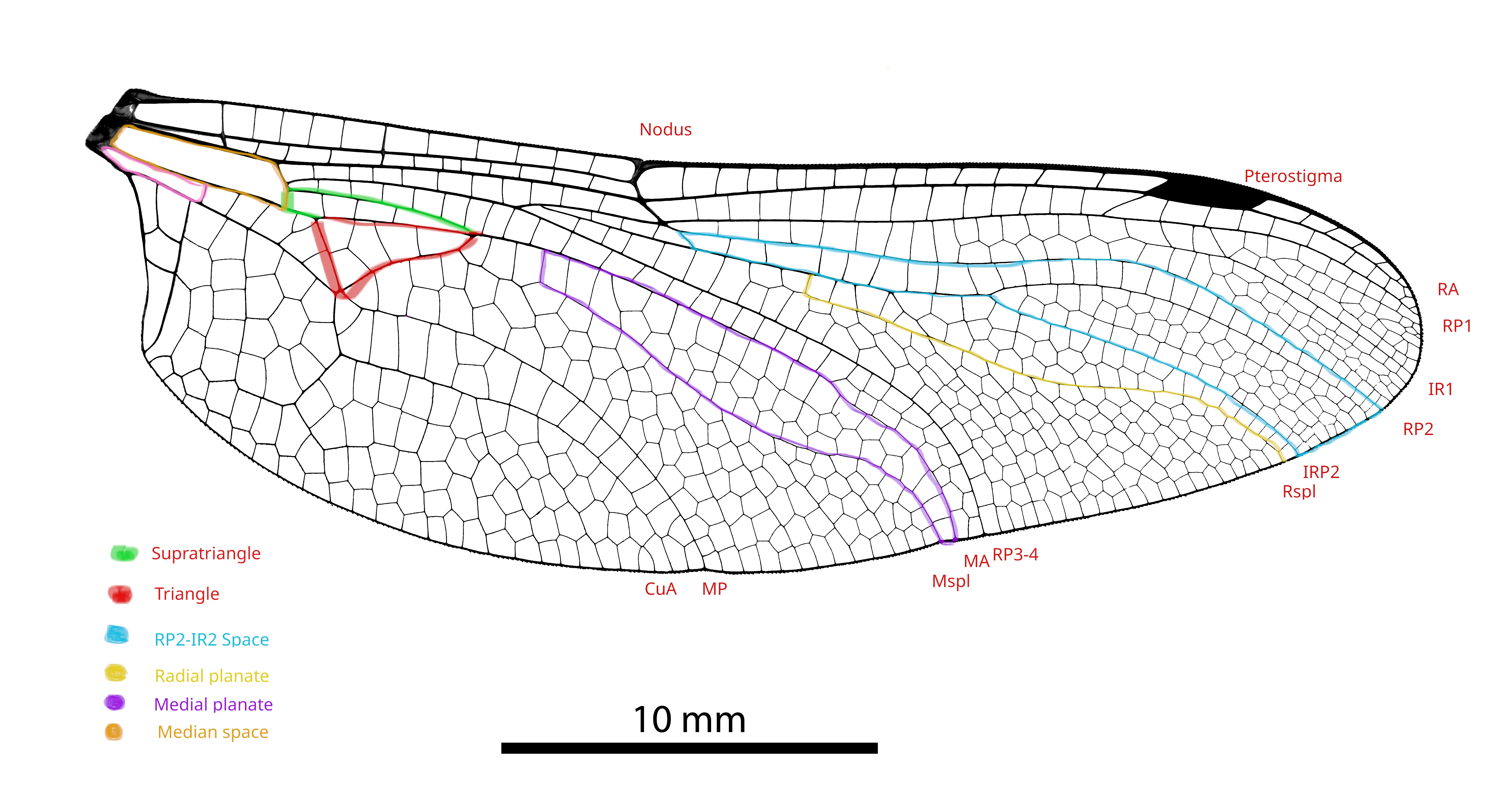
Austrogynacantha heterogena annotated hindwing veins

Dragonflies are seemingly rare in the Okanagan Highlands with only a single fossil being reported prior to 2019, and few specimens known in museum collections. Antiquiala snyderae was identified from only the type specimen, the holotype, number SR 08-10-08 A&B, which is a compression fossil preserved in the Stonerose Interpretive Center paleoentomological collection. The holotype was found at the Klondike Mountain Formations "B4131" locality, also called the "Boot hill" site. The fossil was described by paleontologist S. Bruce Archibald and entomologist Robert Cannings in 2019 and they coined the specific epithet snyderae as a matronym honoring Sarah Snyder who found the fossil and donated it to Stonerose. They chose the feminine genus name as a combination of the Latin antiquus, meaning "ancient", and ala, meaning "wing". Both names have been registered in ZooBank.

Archibald and Cannings (2019) placed the new genus into the dragonfly family Aeshnidae and subfamily Aeshninae. The family placement was determined by having a pterostigmal brace crossvein present at the base of the pterostigma, and having both radial and median planates cell groups present and well developed. They placed the genus in subfamily Aeshninae based on the MA and RP3-4 not running parallel, but slightly widening over their course in the wing. The wing is also missing a cordulegastrid gap next to the nodus. Of the members of Aeshninae, the closest genus to A. snyderae seems to be Huncoaeshna, known from a single Ypresian species described from the Laguna del Hunco Formation in South America. Aeshnidae has a fossil record possibly spanning back to the Cretaceous, depending on if Gomphaeschninae is included in the family, while the modern family comprises approximately 456 species.

== Description ==
As preserved, the only known hindwing is at approximately 35 mm (1.4 in) long and about 23 mm (0.91 in) at its widest, though enough of the basal region is missing to prevent an estimate of the life dimensions. The IRP2 and RP2 veins are simple and run towards the wing apex before curving to the rear wing margin below the dark colored pterostigma. The pterostigma itself is approximately four times longer than its widest point, running the width of 4.3 cells directly below it. A total of five crossveins are present along its length starting a strong brace vein positioned at its basal edge. The veins composing the pterostigmal margin are thickened only on the anterior and posterior sides. The apical edge is slanted at a 45° angle from posterior to anterior margins, while the basal margin is convexly curved. The supratriangle area of wing, located above the MA vain near its basal region, has at least two crossveins, though damage obsucures the possibility of more. The area between the RP1 and RP2 veins gradually expands from one cell width between the nodal and pterostigmal areas. The area beneath the nodus and on the basal side of the RP2 base lacks a cordulegastrid gap cell space.

== Paleoecology ==
Adult darners of the family Aeshnidae are among the dragonflies noted to spend a significant portion of their active adult life in flight. Warmth is generated when needed from the flight muscles. All dragonflies are strong flying active predators who have large eye size granting good visual orientation for hunting. Their spiny legs are used to capture prey insects, usually in flight, and the use the robust mandibles for eating the captured meals. A lack of more dragonfly fossils has suggested to be related to the large wings. Insects with large wings float at the top of the water column longer than small winged or denser insects. This gives fish more opportunities to eat the dragonflies, or for rot to set in and the body disintegrate.

== Paleoenvironment ==
Paleoenvironments

The Republic sites are part of a larger fossil site system collectively known as the Eocene Okanagan Highlands. The highlands, including the Early Eocene formations between Driftwood Canyon at the north and Republic at the south, have been described as one of the "Great Canadian Lagerstätten" based on the diversity, quality and unique nature of the paleofloral and paleofaunal biotas that are preserved. The highlands temperate biome preserved across a large transect of lakes recorded many of the earliest appearances of modern genera, while also documenting the last stands of ancient lines. The warm temperate highland floras in association with downfaulted lacustrine basins and active volcanism are noted to have no exact modern equivalents. This is due to the more seasonally equitable conditions of the Early Eocene, resulting in much lower seasonal temperature shifts. However, the highlands have been compared to the upland ecological islands of the Virunga Mountains within the African rift valleys Albertine Rift.

The Klondike Mountain Formation represents an upland lake system that was surrounded by a warm temperate ecosystem with nearby volcanism dating from during and just after the early Eocene climatic optimum. The Okanagan Highlands likely had a mesic upper microthermal to lower mesothermal climate, in which winter temperatures rarely dropped low enough for snow, and which were seasonably equitable. The paleoforest surrounding the lakes have been described as precursors to the modern temperate broadleaf and mixed forests of Eastern North America and Eastern Asia. Based on the fossil biotas the lakes were higher and cooler than the coeval coastal forests preserved in the Puget Group and Chuckanut Formation of Western Washington, which are described as lowland tropical forest ecosystems. Estimates of the paleoelevation range between 0.7–1.2 km (0.43–0.75 mi) higher than the coastal forests. This is consistent with the paleoelevation estimates for the lake systems, which range between 1.1–2.9 km (1,100–2,900 m), which is similar to the modern elevation 0.8 km (0.50 mi), but higher.

Estimates of the mean annual temperature have been derived from climate leaf analysis multivariate program (CLAMP) analysis and leaf margin analysis (LMA) of the Republic paleoflora. The CLAMP results after multiple linear regressions gave a mean annual temperature of approximately 8.0 °C (46.4 °F), with the LMA giving 9.2 ± 2.0 °C (48.6 ± 3.6 °F). A bioclimatic-based estimate based on modern relatives of the taxa found at Republic suggested mean annual temperatures around 13.5 ± 2.2 °C (56.3 ± 4.0 °F). This is lower than the mean annual temperature estimates given for the coastal Puget Group, which is estimated to have been between 15–18.6 °C (59.0–65.5 °F). The bioclimatic analysis for Republic suggests a mean annual precipitation amount of 115 ± 39 cm (45 ± 15 in).
