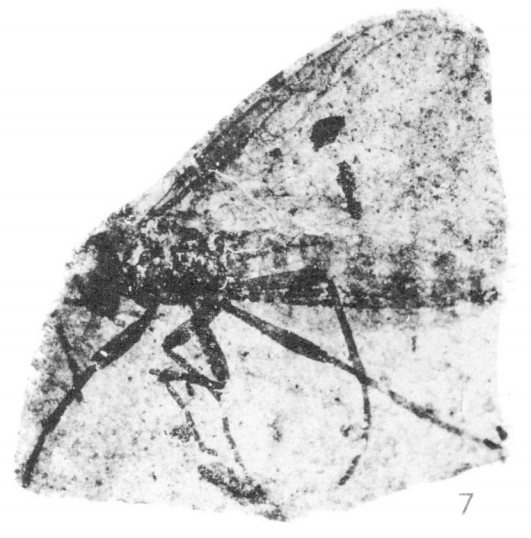
- Plecia avus hypotype fossil

Scientific classification
- Kingdom: Animalia
- Phylum: Arthropoda
- Class: Insecta
- Order: Diptera
- Family: Bibionidae
- Genus: Plecia
- Species: †P. avus

Binomial name
- †Plecia avus (Handlirsch, 1910)

Synonyms
- Penthetria avus Handlirsch, 1910

= Plecia avus =

Extinct species of March fly

Plecia avus is an extinct species of Plecia in the March fly family Bibionidae and is solely known from Early Eocene sediments exposed in central southern British Columbia. The species is one of twenty bibionid species described from the Eocene Okanagan Highlands.

== History & classification ==
The holotype fossil of Plecia avus was collected by Lawrence Lambe from outcrops of the Allenby Formation along the Tulameen River on 6 August 1906, and then subsequently described by Anton Handlirsch in 1910. The type description was published in his Canadian fossil Insects. 5. Insects from the Tertiary lake deposits of the southern interior of British Columbia, along with a series of 19 other bibionid species. Handlirsch did not include the etymological derivation of species names in the volume.

While reviewing the tertiary fossil bibionids of the Eocene Okanagan Highlands, Rice (1959) transferred almost all of the species described by Handlirsch from the genus Penthetria to Plecia based on the angles of the R3+4 vein, which he deemed closer to that of modern Plecia species than that of Penthetria. This decision resulted in the species move from Penthetria avus to Plecia avus and an additional 7 fossils were identified and designated hypotypes of Pl. avus during study of the Geological Survey of Canada collections. Rice additionally noted the close similarity in wing morphology to the species Plecia canadensis, Plecia dilatata, Plecia pictipennis, Plecia pulchra, and Plecia transitoria. Based on the larger specimen set in the re-description, he mused on the possibility they might intergrade enough to be a single species rather than multiple species.

== Distribution ==
Plecia avus has been recovered from up to four locations in the Okanagan highlands, with the holotype, GSC No. 7265, type locality being on the Tulameen River "opposite Vermilion Cliff" in the Allenby Formation near Princeton, British Columbia. H. M. Rice (1959) subsequently identified four additional fossils from the Driftwood Shales near Smithers and another from Tranquille Creek near Cache Creek.

== Description ==
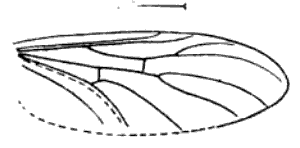
1910 illustration from Handlirsch of the type specimen wing

The wings of Plecia avus are on average between 8.6–10.1 mm (0.34–0.40 in) long and 3.3–3.7 mm (0.13–0.15 in) wide giving them a "narrower" appearance. The costal edge of the wing is only distinctly curved and most specimens show an indentation along the wing edge when the subcostal vein terminates. In specimens where the wing apex is known the acute wing tip symmetrical. The R_{3+4} fork of the radial vein is of moderate long in length and only narrowly diverges from the R_{5}. The anterior cross vein joins the Rs vein close to where it forks, and the space between the anterior cross vein and costal is 0.9–1.15 mm (0.035–0.045 in), being slightly elongated by the narrow wing profile.

== Paleoecology ==
The Okanagan Highland sites represent upland lake systems that were surrounded by a warm temperate ecosystem with nearby volcanism. The highlands likely had a mesic upper microthermal to lower mesothermal climate, in which winter temperatures rarely dropped low enough for snow, and which were seasonably equitable. The Okanagan Highlands paleoforest surrounding the lakes have been described as precursors to the modern temperate broadleaf and mixed forests of Eastern North America and Eastern Asia. Based on the paleofloral and paleofaunal biotas, the lakes were higher and cooler than the coeval coastal forests preserved in the Puget Group and Chuckanut Formation of Western Washington, which are described as lowland tropical forest ecosystems. Estimates of the paleoelevation range between 0.7–1.2 km (0.43–0.75 mi) higher than the coastal forests. This is consistent with the paleoelevation estimates for the lake systems, which range between 1.1–2.9 km (1,100–2,900 m), which is similar to the modern elevation 0.8 km (0.50 mi), but higher.

Estimates of the mean annual temperature have been derived from climate leaf analysis multivariate program (CLAMP) analysis and leaf margin analysis (LMA) the Princeton paleoflora. The CLAMP results after multiple linear regressions for Princeton's gave a 5.1 °C (41.2 °F), and the LMA returned a mean annual temperature of 5.1 ± 2.2 °C (41.2 ± 4.0 °F). This is lower than the mean annual temperature estimates given for the coastal Puget Group, which is estimated to have been between 15–18.6 °C (59.0–65.5 °F). The bioclimatic analysis for Princeton suggest mean annual precipitation amount of 114 ± 42 cm (45 ± 17 in).
