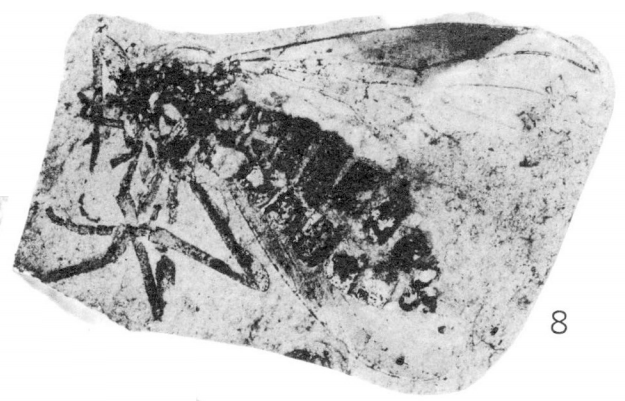
- Plecia canadensis hypotype fossil

Scientific classification
- Kingdom: Animalia
- Phylum: Arthropoda
- Class: Insecta
- Order: Diptera
- Family: Bibionidae
- Genus: Plecia
- Species: †P. canadensis

Binomial name
- †Plecia canadensis (Handlirsch, 1910)

Synonyms
- Penthetria canadensis Handlirsch, 1910

= Plecia canadensis =

Extinct species of flies

Plecia canadensis is an extinct species of Plecia in the fly family Bibionidae. The species is solely known from Early Eocene sediments exposed in central southern British Columbia. The species is one of twenty bibionid species described from the Eocene Okanagan Highlands paleofauna.

== History & classification ==
The holotype fossil of Plecia canadensis was collected by Lawrence Lambe from outcrops of the Allenby Formation along the Tulameen River on 6 August 1906, and then subsequently described by Anton Handlirsch in 1910. The type description was published in his Canadian fossil Insects. 5. Insects from the Tertiary lake deposits of the southern interior of British Columbia, along with a series of 19 other bibionid species. Handlirsch did not include the etymological derivation of species names in the volume.

While reviewing the tertiary fossil bibionids of the Eocene Okanagan Highlands, Rice (1959) transferred almost all described species from the genus Penthetria to Plecia based on the angles of the R3+4 vein, which were deemed closer to that of modern Plecia species than that of Penthetria. This decision resulted in the species move from Penthetria canadensis to Plecia canadensis and an additional 7 fossils were identified as Pl. canadensis during study of the Geological Survey of Canada collections as hypotypes. Rice additionally noted the close similarity in wing morphology to the species Plecia avus, Plecia dilatata, Plecia pictipennis, Plecia pulchra, and Plecia transitoria. Based on the larger specimen set in the redescription, he mused on the possibility they might intergrade enough to be a single species rather than multiple species.

== Description ==
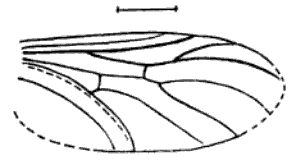
1910 illustration from Handlirsch of the type specimen wing

The wings of Plecia canadensis are on average between 9.5–10.5 mm (0.37–0.41 in) long and 4–4.5 mm (0.16–0.18 in) wide giving them a "stout" appearance. One hypotype wing is smaller than average with an estimated length of 8.2 mm (0.32 in) though it is incomplete so the width was not determinable. The costal edge of the wing is only moderately curved and some specimens show an indentation along the wing edge when the subcostal vein terminates. In specimens where the wing apex is known the wing tip is broadly rounded. The R3+4 fork of the radial vein is of moderate length and diverges from the R5 distinctly.

== Distribution ==
Plecia canadensis has been recovered from up to four locations in the Okanagan highlands, with the type locality being on the Tulameen River "opposite Vermilion Cliff" in the Allenby Formation near Princeton, British Columbia. Additional fossils were subsequently identified by Rice (1959) from the Tranquille Creek near Cache Creek, the driftwood Shales near Smithers, and possibly the Coldwater Beds near Quilchena.

== Paleoecology ==
The Okanagan Highland sites represent upland lake systems that were surrounded by a warm temperate ecosystem with nearby volcanism. The highlands likely had a mesic upper microthermal to lower mesothermal climate, in which winter temperatures rarely dropped low enough for snow, and which were seasonably equitable. The Okanagan Highlands paleoforest surrounding the lakes have been described as precursors to the modern temperate broadleaf and mixed forests of Eastern North America and Eastern Asia. Based on the fossil biotas the lakes were higher and cooler than the coeval coastal forests preserved in the Puget Group and Chuckanut Formation of Western Washington, which are described as lowland tropical forest ecosystems. Estimates of the paleoelevation range between 0.7–1.2 km (0.43–0.75 mi) higher than the coastal forests. This is consistent with the paleoelevation estimates for the lake systems, which range between 1.1–2.9 km (1,100–2,900 m), which is similar to the modern elevation 0.8 km (0.50 mi), but higher.

Estimates of the mean annual temperature have been derived from climate leaf analysis multivariate program (CLAMP) analysis and leaf margin analysis (LMA) the Princeton paleoflora. The CLAMP results after multiple linear regressions for Princeton's gave a 5.1 °C (41.2 °F), and the LMA returned a mean annual temperature of 5.1 ± 2.2 °C (41.2 ± 4.0 °F). This is lower than the mean annual temperature estimates given for the coastal Puget Group, which is estimated to have been between 15–18.6 °C (59.0–65.5 °F). The bioclimatic analysis for Princeton suggest mean annual precipitation amount of 114 ± 42 cm (45 ± 17 in).
