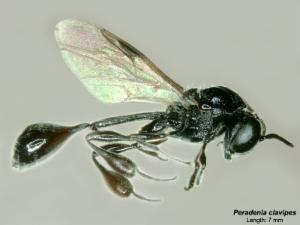
- Peradenia clavipes

Scientific classification
- Kingdom: Animalia
- Phylum: Arthropoda
- Clade: Pancrustacea
- Class: Insecta
- Order: Hymenoptera
- Suborder: Apocrita
- Infraorder: Proctotrupomorpha
- Superfamily: Proctotrupoidea
- Family: Peradeniidae; Naumann & Masner, 1985
- Genus: Peradenia; Naumann & Masner, 1985

Type species
- Peradenia clavipes Naumann & Masner, 1985

= Peradenia =

Genus of wasps

Peradenia is the only genus in the family Peradeniidae. Its 2 living species can be found in the temperate forests of Southeastern Australia and Tasmania. A fossil specimen was found in baltic amber, implying the genus once had a broader distribution. While the hosts of the species are unknown they have been collected in association with Eucalyptus stellulata. Adults are active in either autumn or winter.

Body length is 5-10mm. Distinctly club-shaped legs and metasoma, in addition to large compound eyes. Body and legs are a non-metallic black with fine silver hairs.

== Taxonomy ==
The name of the genus is derived from two aboriginal words meaning "a club-bearing wasp" in reference to its club-shaped metasoma. Currently there are three species placed with Peradenia:

- P. clavipes Naumann & Masner, 1985
- †P. galerita Johnson, Musetti & Janzen 2001
- P. micranepsia Naumann & Masner, 1985
