= Aenigmastacus =

Aenigmastacus crandalli Temporal range: Ypresian

Scientific classification
- Kingdom: Animalia
- Phylum: Arthropoda
- Class: Malacostraca
- Order: Decapoda
- Suborder: Pleocyemata
- Family: Parastacidae
- Genus: †Aenigmastacus; Feldmann, Schweitzer & Leahy, 2011
- Species: †A. crandalli

Binomial name
- †Aenigmastacus crandalli Feldmann, Schweitzer & Leahy, 2011

Extinct genus of crayfish

Aenigmastacus crandalli is a species of fossil freshwater crayfish. It was found in early Eocene Okanagan Highlands lake deposits in British Columbia, and was described in 2011. It is the first member of the Gondwana-distributed family Parastacidae to be found in the Northern Hemisphere, and is the only species in the genus Aenigmastacus. Twelve specimens are known, with a total body length of 3–5 cm (1.2–2.0 in). On some specimens, details of the internal anatomy can be seen due to the exceptional preservation.

== Distribution ==
Aenigmastacus was discovered in the Tranquille Formation's McAbee Fossil Beds of British Columbia, Canada, at 50°47.181′N 121°8.568′W. The McAbee beds comprise a 30-metre (100 ft) thickness of siliceous sediments within a sequence dominated by volcaniclastic rocks. They are formed from lake deposits, based on the presence of five families of freshwater fish and other terrestrial taxa, and the fossil-bearing sediments have been dated to the Early Eocenes Ypresian. The deposition of a silica-rich sediment deriving from diatoms indicates a calm environment with little influx of terrestrial silt. There is an alternation of dark and light layers, which may indicate a seasonal change, such as freezing over in winter. The bottom of the lake was probably anoxic, which may have aided the preservation of fossils.

== Description ==
Twelve "nearly complete" specimens of Aenigmastacus have been recovered, with total body lengths of between 3–5 centimetres (1.2–2.0 in). The carapace is thin and the form of the rostrum is not known. The antennae are as long as the carapace, but the eyes have not been preserved on any of the known specimens. The first pair of pereiopods are larger than the others, and are armed with a nearly symmetrical pair of chelae (claws). The pleon (abdomen) is generally smooth, and ends in a broad, slightly tapering telson with no diaeresis. The specimens of Aenigmastacus show exceptional preservation. In some specimens, dark areas formed of fluorapatite can be seen, which appear to represent soft tissue in a pattern congruent with the endophragmal skeleton of extant crayfishes. The trace of the alimentary tract is also visible in some specimens.

== Taxonomy ==
Aenigmastacus crandalli was described as a new genus and species in the Journal of Crustacean Biology by Rodney Feldmann, Carrie Schweitzer and John Leahy in 2011. The genus name, Aenigmastacus, derives from the Latin aenigma, meaning "inexplicable", and the name of the genus Astacus, which is frequently used as a suffix for genus names of crayfish. The specific epithet crandalli commemorates the crayfish expert Keith A. Crandall of George Washington University.

The chief distinction between the Northern Hemisphere superfamily Astacoidea and the Southern Hemisphere superfamily Parastacoidea is usually the form of the genitalia, but these have not been preserved in any known specimen of Aenigmastacus. Feldmann et al. therefore relied on the form of the telson, which has a diaeresis (division into two halves) in Astacoidea, but none in Parastacoidea; this distinction was noted by Thomas Henry Huxley, Martin Glaessner and Horton H. Hobbs, Jr. While no diaeresis is visible on the telson of Aenigmastacus, a diaeresis on the uropods, which is seen in both superfamilies, is preserved in some specimens of Aenigmastacus, suggesting that its apparent absence from the telson is not merely an artefact of preservation.

== Biogeography ==
Fossils of freshwater crayfish are extremely rare. Only 13 species are known in total, and only two from North America, the Astacidae species Pacifastacus chenoderma and the Cambaridae species Procambarus primaevus, both of which belong to families still represented in North America. Aenigmastacus, by contrast, belongs to the Southern Hemisphere family Parastacidae, and is that family's only Northern Hemisphere representative.
