= Palaeoperenethis =

Palaeoperenethis Temporal range: Ypresian

Scientific classification
- Domain: Eukaryota
- Kingdom: Animalia
- Phylum: Arthropoda
- Subphylum: Chelicerata
- Class: Arachnida
- Order: Araneae
- Infraorder: Araneomorphae
- Family: Pisauridae
- Genus: †Palaeoperenethis
- Species: †P. thaleri

Binomial name
- †Palaeoperenethis thaleri Seldon & Penney, 2009

Extinct genus of spiders

Palaeoperenethis is an extinct monotypic genus of nursery web spider family Pisauridae, and at present, it contains the single species Palaeoperenethis thaleri. The genus is solely known from Early Eocene, Ypresian Okanagan Highlands deposits in the Cariboo region of British Columbia, Canada.

== History and classification ==
Palaeoperenethis thaleri is known only from one fossil, the holotype, number "ROM31304" consisting of part and counterpart impressions that is currently residing in the paleontological collections in the Royal Ontario Museum, Toronto, Ontario, Canada. It is an adult male individual preserved as a compression fossil in the fine-grained lacustrian rock and thus has been flattened from its dimensions in life. The compression specimen was mentioned in publication by paleoichthylologist Mark Wilson (1977) while discussing the paleoecology of the Horsefly Shales Lagerstätte fossil site. P. thaleri was first studied by Paul A. Selden and David Penney, with their 2009 type description being published in the journal Contributions to Natural History. The generic name was coined by P. Selden and D. Penney as a combination of the Greek word palaios meaning "ancient" and Perenethis, a modern Nursery web spider genus. This is in reference to the age of the type specimen and the African-Asian genus which Palaeoperenethis is similar in appearance to. The specific epithet "thaleri" was designated by P. Selden and D. Penney in honor of the late Dr. Konrad Thaler, past president of the International Society of Arachnology.

== Description ==
Due to the incomplete nature of the type specimen, the carapace and opisthosoma are missing, the overall size of Palaeoperenethis thaleri is not certain. The general shape of the carapace is indicated in the position and disposition of the legs which suggest a subcircular or polygonal carapace. The placement of Palaeoperenethis into Pisauridae is based on the shape and structure of the elongated pedipalps which have a brush of bristles along one edge. Several important characters of the family, such as nursery web construction and egg sack care, are not verifiable in the fossil. The presence of Palaeoperenethis in a lacustrine environment is another feature indicating a placement in Pisauridae. While bristles on the pedipalp are also known in the family Trechaleidae, other overall morphology found in Palaeoperenethis is much closer to Pisauridae. Though the morphology is similar to the modern genus Perenethis a direct relationship to the genus is unknown, however Palaeoperenethis is most similar to members of the subfamily Pisaurinae.
