= Microberotha =

Microberotha Temporal range: Ypresian

Scientific classification
- Kingdom: Animalia
- Phylum: Arthropoda
- Class: Insecta
- Order: Neuroptera
- Family: Berothidae
- Subfamily: Cyrenoberothinae
- Genus: †Microberotha; Archibald & Makarkin, 2004
- Species: †M. macculloughi

Binomial name
- †Microberotha macculloughi Archibald & Makarkin, 2004

Extinct genus of insects

Microberotha is an extinct monotypic genus of "beaded lacewing" in the family Berothidae known from a fossil found in North America. When described the genus contained a single Ypresian-age species Microberotha macculloughi.

== History and classification ==
The genus is known from a single male specimen, the holotype, currently deposited in the collections of the Kelowna Centennial Museum in Kelowna, British Columbia, as number "NH.998.015.002". The type specimen is well preserved in early Early Eocene Hat Creek amber from deposits between Cache Creek and Lillooet, British Columbia, which are part of the Eocene Okanagan Highlands Lagerstätten. The fossil was first studied by Bruce Archibald of Simon Fraser University and Vladimir Makarkin of the Far Eastern Branch of the Russian Academy of Sciences. Archibald and Makarkin published their type description in the journal The Canadian Entomologist volume 136 published in 2004. The genus name is a combination of the Greek mikros meaning "small" and Berotha, a genus in the family Berothidae. The species name is in honor of Terry McCullough, a supporter of paleontological research at the type locality. "Mac" is used in the species epithet to conform to the International Code of Zoological Nomenclature recommendations regarding names from personal names. The terminal segments of the abdomen on the holotype, necessary in determining subfamily placement, are not visible given the angles of view available through the amber. This difficulty prevents the genus from being placed at the subfamily level, thus Archibald and Makarkin placed the genus as incertae sedis in the family. A close association between Microberotha and the cretaceous genera Protoberotha and Sibelliberotha was noted by Huang et al. (2019) who grouped the trio phylogenetically between the subfamilies Cyrenoberothinae and Nosybinae The placement of the three genera in Cyrenoberothinae was fully affirmed by Machado et al. (2022) when they reevauated the subfmaily and described the first cave dwelling berothid genus Speleoberotha.

== Description ==
Microberotha can be distinguished from other berothids by the combination of an unbranched "Rs" vein and lack of an outer gradate series of crossveins in the forewings. With a forewing length of only 3.36 mm (0.132 in), M. macculloughi is one of the smallest known members of Berothidae to have been described. The smallest living species, Manselliberotha neuropterologorum, has a minimum forewing length of 3.6 mm (0.14 in), while some species from the New Jersey ambers are smaller at a minimum of 2.6 mm (0.10 in). The holotype is preserved in a specimen of amber which shows distinct flow patterning indicating it started as a "stalactite" or similar formation on the tree. The positioning of the insect relative to the flow pattern indicates it was most likely trapped with its back stuck to the inner flow with its left side facing down. A later, thicker flow covered the insect, twisting the left hindwing and disarticulating both the hindlegs.
