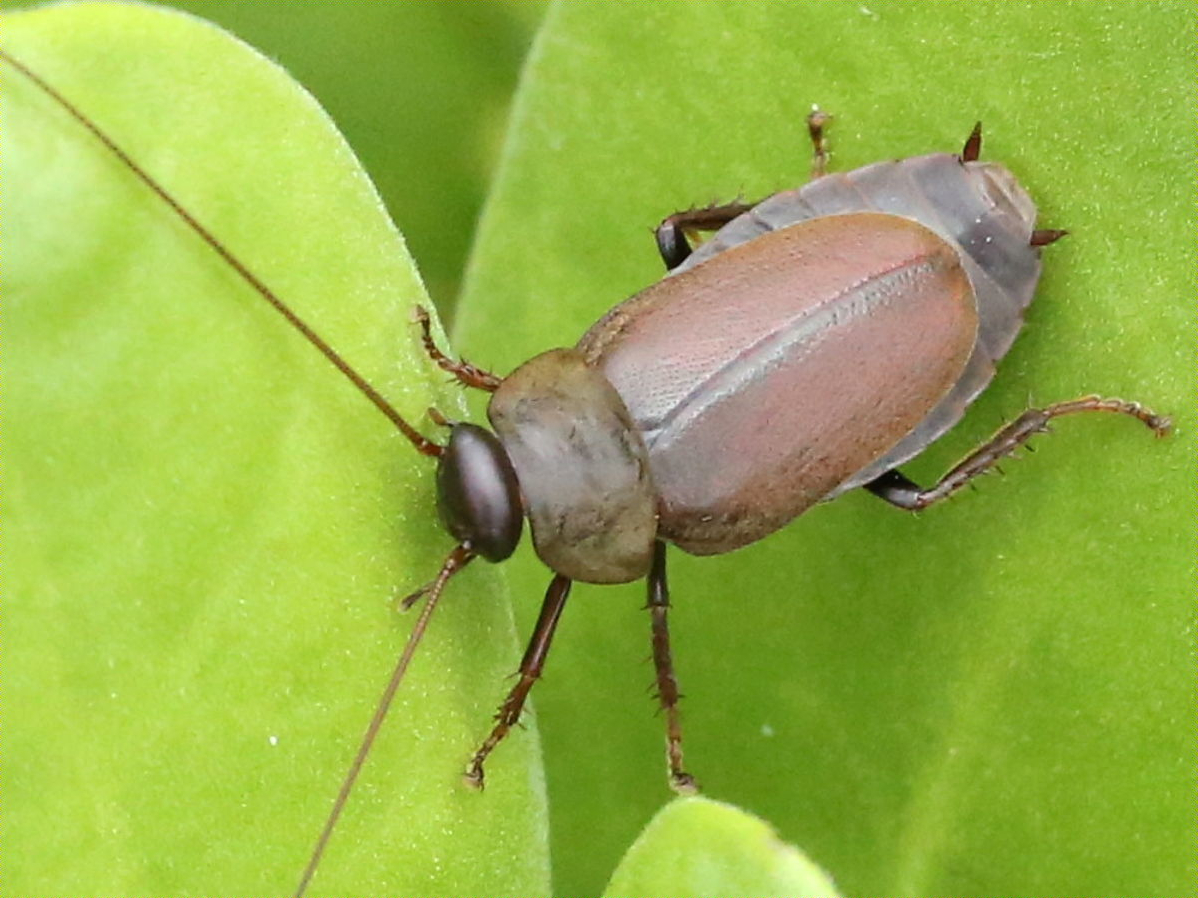
- Adult in Molokai, Hawaii

Scientific classification
- Kingdom: Animalia
- Phylum: Arthropoda
- Clade: Pancrustacea
- Class: Insecta
- Order: Blattodea
- Family: Blaberidae
- Genus: Diploptera
- Species: D. punctata

Binomial name
- Diploptera punctata (Eschscholtz, 1822)

Synonyms
- Blatta dytiscoides Serville, 1838; Diploptera silpha Saussure, 1864

= Diploptera punctata =

Species of cockroach

Diploptera punctata, the Pacific beetle cockroach, is a species of cockroach in the family Blaberidae and subfamily Diplopterinae. It is one of the few cockroach species that is viviparous. Adults are chemically defended, having a modified tracheal gland and spiracle on each side which squirts quinones which can poison or discourage a predator.

== Life stages ==
Diploptera punctata has 4 nymph stages, which are wingless. The adult is winged, and the adult male is smaller than the female.

== Distribution ==
Diploptera punctata can be found in Australia, Myanmar, China, Fiji, Hawaii, and India.

== Milk ==
Diploptera punctata produces a nutritionally dense crystalline "milk" to feed their live-born young.

The milk produced by Diploptera punctata is composed of hydrosoluble proteins and provides essential amino acids to the developing embryo such as lysine, leucine and valine.
