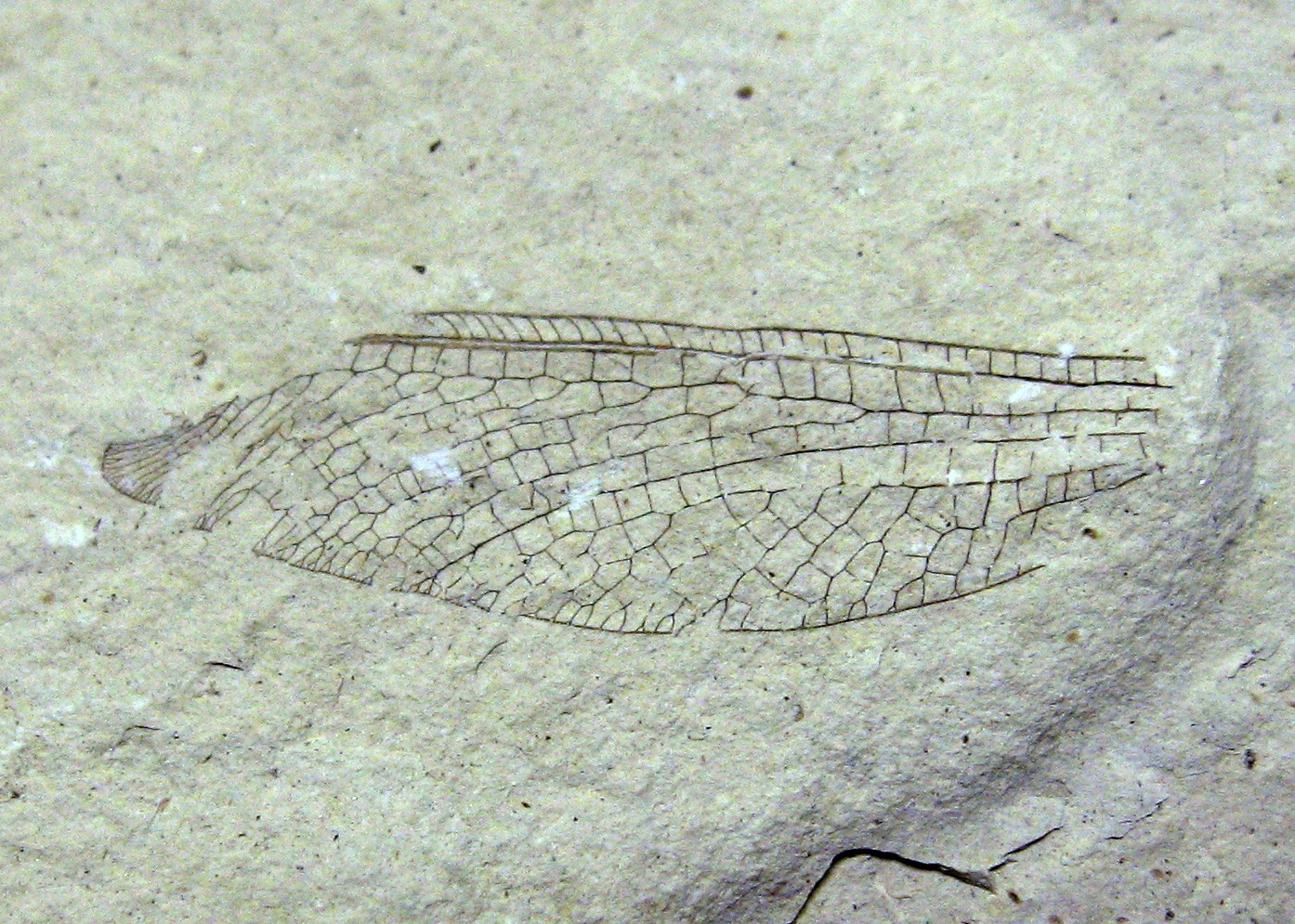

Scientific classification
- Domain: Eukaryota
- Kingdom: Animalia
- Phylum: Arthropoda
- Class: Insecta
- Order: Neuroptera
- Family: Nymphidae
- Genus: Nymphes
- Species: †N. georgei

Binomial name
- †Nymphes georgei Archibald, Makarkin & Ansorge, 2009

= Nymphes georgei =

Nymphes georgei Temporal range: Ypresian

Extinct species of insect

Nymphes georgei is an extinct species of lacewing which existed in Washington during the Eocene period.
