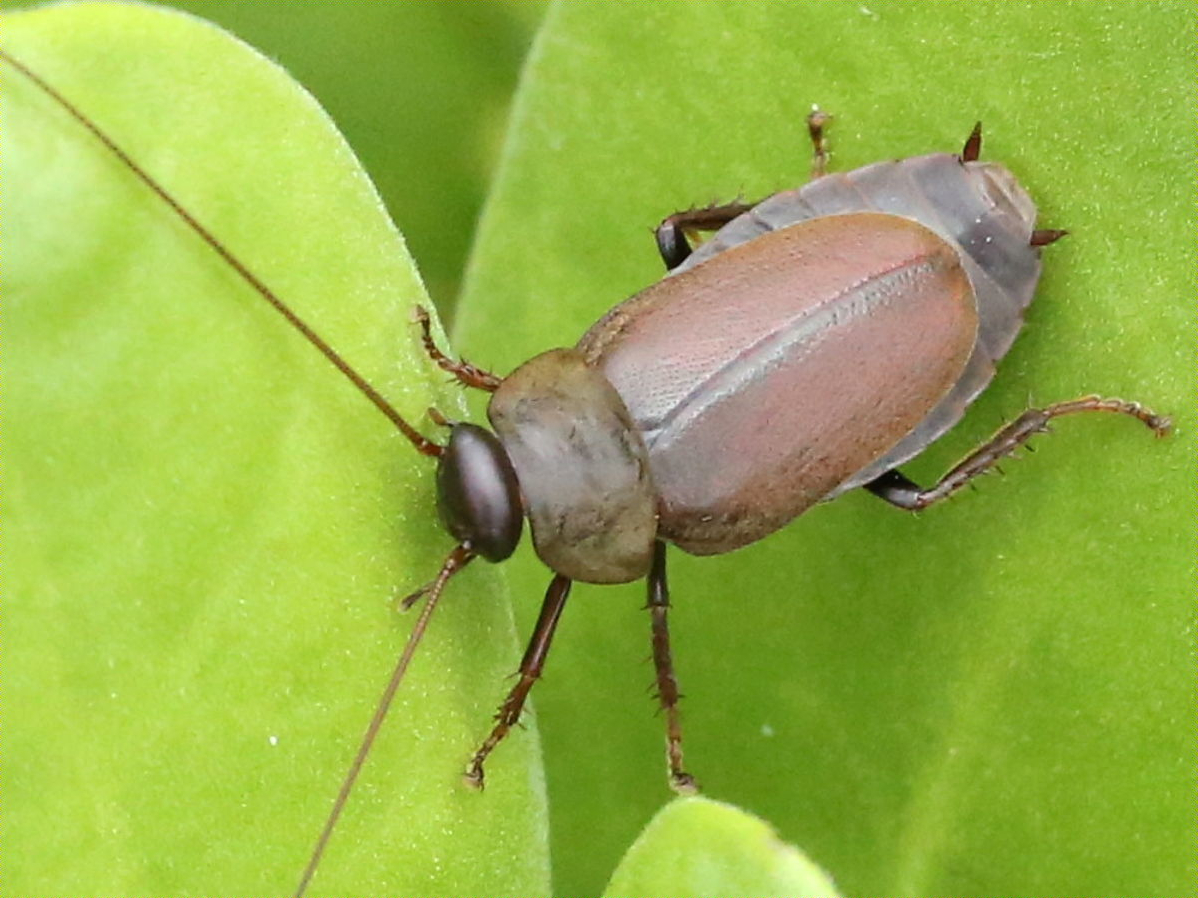
- Adult Diploptera punctata

Scientific classification
- Kingdom: Animalia
- Phylum: Arthropoda
- Clade: Pancrustacea
- Class: Insecta
- Order: Blattodea
- Family: Blaberidae
- Subfamily: Diplopterinae
- Genus: Diploptera de Saussure, 1864

Species
- See text

= Diploptera =

Genus of cockroaches

Diploptera, occasionally called beetle cockroaches, is a genus of blaberid cockroaches in the monotypic subfamily Diplopterinae. Cockroaches of this genus resemble beetles, with hardened tegmina and cross-folded hindwings. They live in tropical forests in South China and Southeast Asia, and Pacific islands including Hawaii. They are viviparous cockroaches and are therefore used for insect endocrinological studies.

== Species ==
The Cockroach Species File lists:

- Diploptera bicolor Hanitsch, 1925
- Diploptera elliptica Li & Wang, 2015
- Diploptera erythrocephala Princis, 1950
- Diploptera maculata Hanitsch, 1925
- Diploptera minor (Brunner von Wattenwyl, 1865)
- Diploptera naevus Li & Wang, 2015
- Diploptera nigrescens Shiraki, 1931
  - D. n. nigrescens Shiraki, 1931
  - D. n. guani Li & Wang, 2015
- Diploptera parva Princis, 1953
- Diploptera punctata (Eschscholtz, 1822) - type species (as Diploptera silpha Saussure)
