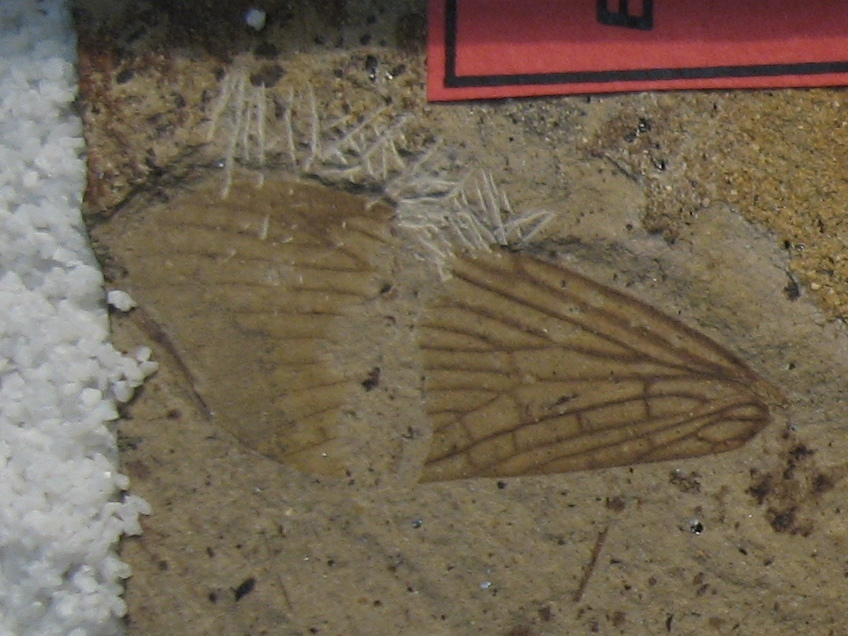
- Eorpa elverumi holotype

Scientific classification
- Kingdom: Animalia
- Phylum: Arthropoda
- Clade: Pancrustacea
- Class: Insecta
- Order: Mecoptera
- Superfamily: Panorpoidea
- Family: †Eorpidae; Archibald, Mathewes, & Greenwood, 2013
- Genus: †Eorpa; Archibald, Mathewes, & Greenwood, 2013

Species
- Eorpa elverumi; Eorpa jurgeni; Eorpa ypsipeda

= Eorpa (insect) =

Eorpa Temporal range: Ypresian

Extinct family of insects

Eorpidae is a small family of extinct insects in the scorpionfly order, Mecoptera, which contains a single genus, Eorpa. Three Eocene age species found in Western North America have been placed into the genus: E. elverumi, E. jurgeni, and E. ypsipeda.

== History and classification ==
When described, Eorpidae was identified from a series of over thirty-five compression fossils in silty yellow to grayish shales recovered from the Ypresian Eocene Okanagan Highlands central and southern fossil sites in Washington state and British Columbia. Both the McAbee Fossil Beds near Cache Creek, BC and the Falklands site, near Falkland, BC have sediments belonging to the Kamloops group Tranquille Formation. The Quilchena site outcrop near Quilchena, BC exposes shale of the Coldwater Formation, also a member formation of the Kamloops group. The southernmost fossils are from several outcrops of the Klondike Mountain Formation in Republic, Washington.

The family, genus, and species were first described by paleoentomologists S. Bruce Archibald, Rolf Mathews, and David Greenwood with their 2013 type description being published in the natural sciences journal Journal of Paleontology. The family name is a combination of the genus name Eorpa and -"idae" following International Code of Zoological Nomenclature naming articles. The genus name is a combination of Eos, the Greek mythology goddess of dawn, a reference to the Eocene and "-orpa", a common suffix for mecopterans. The specific epithet elverumi is a patronym honoring John Elverum, finder of the type specimen. Similarly jurgeni is a patronym recognizing Jurgen Mathewes for years of collecting and research assistance at Quilchena. The type species E. ypsipeda has a specific epithet derived from the Greek word ypsipeda meaning "highlands", referring to the upland habitat of the family.

Eorpa elverumi was described from two fossil wings, the holotype SRUI 08-07-07 a&b and the paratype SRUI 08-02-01 a&b, both found in the Klondike Mountain formation. The fossils are preserved in the collections of the Stonerose Interpretive Center in Republic Washington. E. jurgeni was known from only the holotype wing, Q-0096, recovered from Quilchena and housed at Simon Fraser University. Unlike the other two species, E. ypsipeda was described from a series of over 35 fossils, both complete insects and isolated wings. All the full insect specimens were from the McAbee fossil site, while the wings are from McAbee and possibly Republic and the Falklands site. The specimens are housed at a number of different institutions including the Royal Tyrell Museum and the Burke Museum of Natural History and Culture.

== Description ==
As with all mecopteran members, eorpids possess an elongated rostrum and four elongated wings of nearly equal size, and uniquely a "Radial_{1}" vein which almost reaches the apex of the wing. Eorpidae is distinguished from most other panorpoid families by five branches of the medial vein. The elongated abdomen as seen in Holcorpidae, and by the much less curved nature of "Radial_{1}" vein seen in Dinopanorpidae separate Eorpidae from those two families.

=== Eorpa elverumi ===
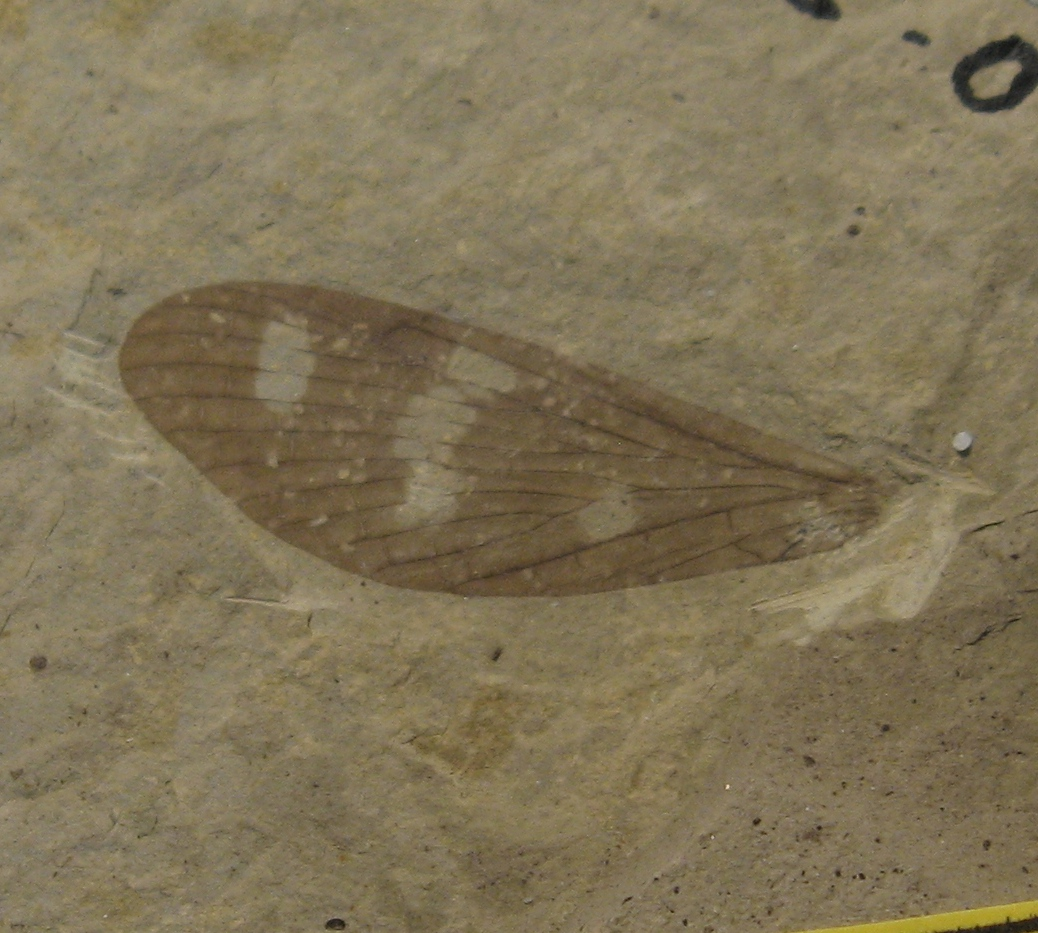
Eorpa sp. possibly E. ypsipeda

Eorpa elverumi has a forewing that is light in color to largely hyaline, with a darker tone to the pterostigmal region. The species is distinct from the sister species in that it lacks the 4th and 5th forks of the subcubital veins, which the other two species have. Also the wing has a number of crossveins that connect the Ms vein to the CuA.

=== Eorpa jurgeni ===
The hindwing of E. jurgeni is similar in outline to E. elverumi in that it is broad in depth, but unlike that species, it has a mottled color patterning to the wing. The cross-veination of the wing is also much less robust. Overall it is estimated the wing would have been between 17–18 mm (0.67–0.71 in) in length, but only 16 mm (0.63 in) in preserved length and is missing the apical portion. It is also the broadest hindwing, at 8 mm (0.31 in), of all the specimens studied for the type descriptions. The wing has an R_{1} vein which forks from the Radial vein more basally then in E. ypsipeda.

=== Eorpa ypsipeda ===
The E. ypsipeda forewings are distinct from E. elverumi in that they all have Sc_{4} and Sc_{5} forks on the Sc vein. There are no cross veins connecting either the Rs_{3} and Rs_{4} or the M_{3} and M_{4}. The wings all have a notable patterning to the coloration and range from 15.5–16.5 mm (0.61–0.65 in) in length. The head and body have the general panorpoid body morphology, though the legs show fine annular hair growths. The wings have a generally dark coloration, with two lighter windows in the middle area the one closer to the apex being slightly chevron shaped and the base window more spot like.
