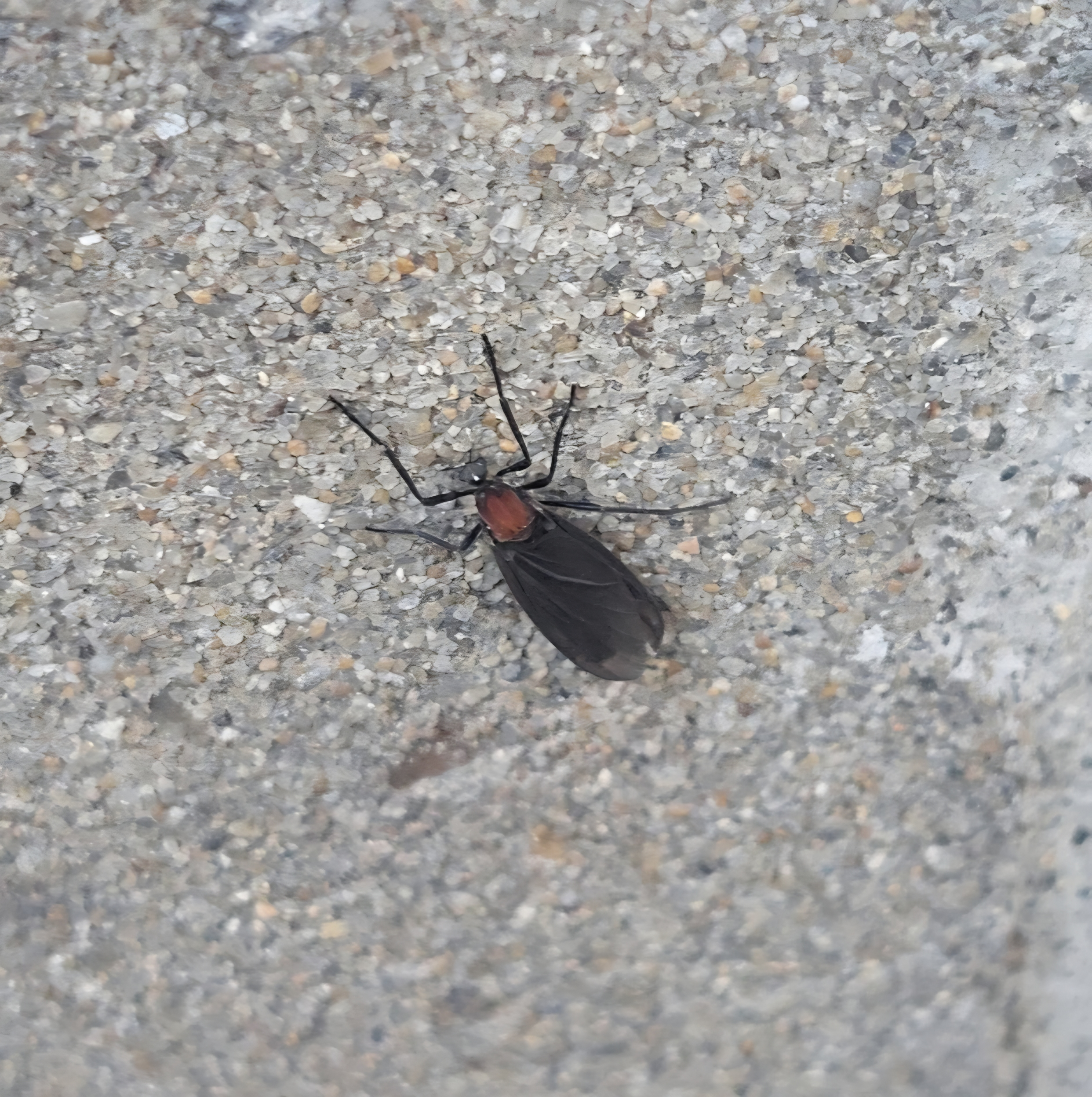
- Plecia longiforceps in Goyang, Gyeonggi Province, South Korea

Scientific classification
- Kingdom: Animalia
- Phylum: Arthropoda
- Clade: Pancrustacea
- Class: Insecta
- Order: Diptera
- Family: Bibionidae
- Genus: Plecia
- Species: P. longiforceps

Binomial name
- Plecia longiforceps Duda, 1934

= Plecia longiforceps =

Species of march fly

Plecia longiforceps is a species of march fly native to southeastern China and Taiwan. It has spread to the Ryukyu Islands of Japan and to South Korea. Like several other species in the genus Plecia, it is known as a lovebug because mating adults often remain joined while flying. Large seasonal swarms have occurred in the Seoul Capital Area since 2022.

== Taxonomy ==
The German dipterist Oswald Duda described Plecia longiforceps in 1934 from specimens collected in Kiangsu (now Jiangsu), China. Plecia sinensis, described by D. Elmo Hardy in 1953, was later placed in synonymy with P. longiforceps. Early South Korean news reports identified the insects as the North American lovebug Plecia nearctica, but a study of morphology and mitochondrial DNA found the two species to be only distantly related.

== Description and ecology ==
Adults have a black body and a distinctive rufous (reddish) thorax. Mating pairs often remain attached end to end while flying.

The species has two flight seasons a year in the subtropical Ryukyu Islands, in spring and autumn, but in the cooler Korean climate it emerges only once, in late June and early July. The soil-dwelling larvae feed on and decompose organic matter.

A 2024 study analysed the microbiomes of 41 adults collected in Seoul. Bacteria of the genus Rickettsia occurred in every specimen and accounted for an average of 80.4 percent of the sequences; Pandoraea occurred in 11 specimens. The detected Rickettsia was more closely related to arthropod endosymbionts than to spotted-fever-group rickettsiae. The authors concluded that the bacteria detected were unlikely to be transmitted as human pathogens.

== Distribution ==
The species is native to southeastern China and Taiwan. Outside that range, specimens have been collected in the Ryukyu Islands since at least 1996; the species had reached Okinawa Island by 2015. South Korea's environment ministry states that it was first identified in the country in 2015. The first peer-reviewed record from South Korea was based on specimens collected in the Seoul area in 2021 and 2022. These are the northernmost published records of the species and suggest an expansion into the temperate zone.

== Outbreaks in South Korea ==
Large swarms in northwestern Seoul and nearby Goyang drew public complaints in 2022. They appeared in more parts of Seoul in 2023 and were reported across much of the city in 2024. In late June 2025, large swarms gathered at the summit of Gyeyangsan in Incheon. On 4 July, the environment ministry sent 37 personnel and control equipment to remove insects and accumulated carcasses. In 2026 the ministry expanded its coordinated response across Seoul, Incheon and Gyeonggi Province, including larval control, water-spraying drones and traps for adults.

The flies do not bite people and are not known to transmit disease, but large swarms are considered a nuisance because the insects cling to clothing, vehicles and buildings. Researchers think the flies most likely reached Korea in horticultural goods or with travellers, and that a warming climate has helped them become established.

Because the flies are attracted to light, the Seoul Metropolitan Government advises dimming outdoor lighting at night and sealing gaps in window screens. It suggests removing any that get indoors by hand rather than spraying insecticide, which also kills beneficial insects. The city describes the flies as beneficial, because the larvae decompose organic matter and adults pollinate flowers.

== See also ==
- Plecia nearctica, the North American lovebug
