= Gyeyang =

- Hangul: 계양
- RR: Gyeyang
- MR: Kyeyang

Gyeyang may refer to:

- Gyeyang District, a district of Incheon, South Korea
- Gyeyang Station, a station of Incheon Subway

== See also ==
- Gyeyangsan (Mount Gyeyang), the second-highest mountain in Incheon
- Kyeyang Electric, South Korean manufacturing company based Seoul, with factories in Ansan and Cheonan
