= South Korea and the World Bank =

National Flag of South Korea

South Korea first joined the World Bank Group as a member in 1955. Over the years, South Korea manages to develop its economy in a successful and positive manner. The country now is a financial contributor to the World Bank to help other, rather than an aid recipient in the old days. Under the help and cooperation with the World Bank, South Korea became a rapid growth country in economy begin in the 1970s, and it now became a large shareholder of the institution to help out other developing countries.

== Lending History with the World Bank ==
In the lending history between the World Bank and South Korea, the country has received financial help from the International Bank for Reconstruction and Development(IBRD) and International Development Association(IDA), combined 133 credit or loan projects, with total commitment amount of $15,591,567,617.10 The last approved project to the country was in Oct 1998, and the last project got fully repaid by South Korea was one June 2002. The International Finance Corporation (IFC) of the World Bank Group also provide investment to private sectors in South Korea in the 2000s, there are total three investment projects that involved 150 million USD.

== Current Partnership with the World Bank ==
the World Bank Logo

As South Korea has been the top 15 largest economy in the world for the since the 2010s, it is now an important financial contributor to the World Bank Group instead of a borrower a few decades ago. There are different types of joint projects, funds, and initiatives between the South Korea government and the World Bank groups, and each of them carries different functions and purposes. Below are some examples of their cooperation.

=== The Korea- World Bank Partnership Facility (KWPF) ===
The KWPF is an initiative under the direct cooperation between the World Bank Group and the Korea's Ministry of Economy and Finance to help out other developing member countries. There are three phases under the plan currently that provides totally 320 million USD by the end of fiscal year of 2023.

According to the official worlds, there are three Pillars of Collaboration for the facility:

- Financing for Global and Regional WBG Programs
- Co-financing of WBG Country Investments
- Generation and Transfer of Development Knowledge

This initiatives has successfully implemented and funded projects such as:

- Youth Employment in the Animation Industry in Jamaica. It is a project organized under the KWPF and the World Bank trying to explore the opportunity to develop the animation industry in Jamaica.

=== The World Bank Group Korea Office Trust Fund Agreement ===
To better incorporate the World Bank's goals and core ideas and improve the partnership between the organization and the country, a new main office and liaison office was set up in South Korea in December 2013. And the office's goals is " The office will focus on infrastructure, information communications technology, the financial sector and knowledge sharing." The World Bank and South Korea agreed to an extension to this office agreement for three more years in April, 2018. With some expanded categories of help to the developing countries in the member countries of the World Bank, such as "energy, environment, natural resources, urban development and land-geospatial management, working in fragile and conflict states, financial sector, innovation and knowledge management", according to the official words reported by The Korea Herald.

=== Korea Trust Fund ===
One of the current joint project under the Trust Fund Agreement, is the Korea Trust Fund for Economic & Peace-Building Transitions. This fund was established in 2009. With the cooperation with the World Bank Group, its goals are about providing help to different levels of government in different parts of the world to help them to avoid "Fragility, Conflict and Violence.(FCV)"

== South Korea's Representation and Power in the World Bank. ==
South Korea is in the constituency group EDS09 with Australia, Cambodia, Kiribati, Republic of Korea, Republic of the Marshall Islands, Federated States of Micronesia, Mongolia, Nauru, New Zealand, Palau, Papua New Guinea, Samoa, Solomon Islands, Tuvalu, and Vanuatu. The current Executive Director of this constituency is Kunil Hwang, he has served in this position since November 2018.

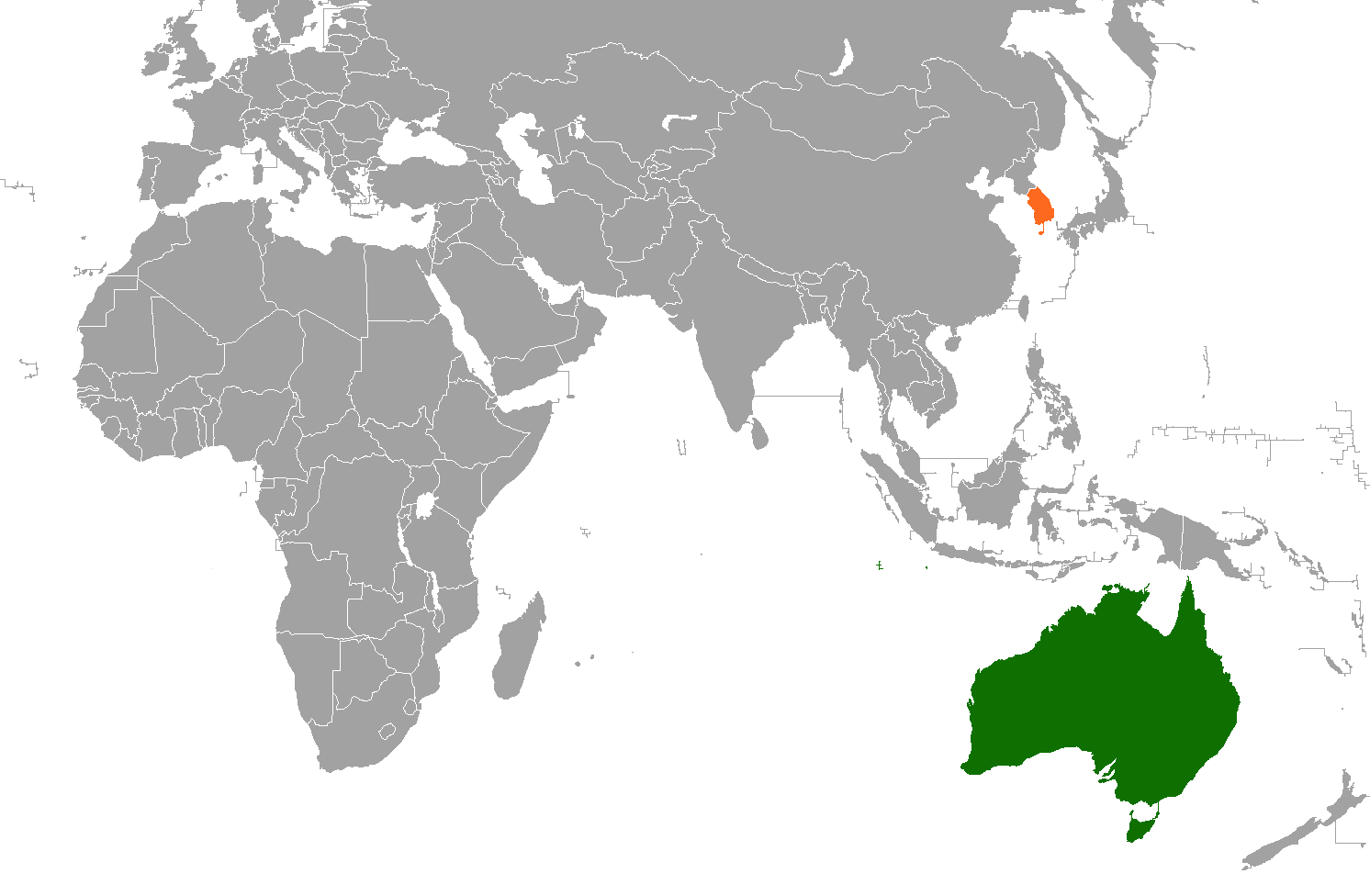
Map highlighting locations of South Korea and Australia

As of the most updated information, the voting power of South Korea in the World Bank Groups are:

- 1.60% of votes in IBRD (International Bank for Reconstruction and Development)
- 0.95% of votes in IDA (International Development Association)
- 1.07% of votes in IFC (International Finance Corporation)
- 0.47% of votes in MIGA (Multilateral Investment Guarantee Agency)

== See also ==
- International Economic Consultative Organization for Korea
