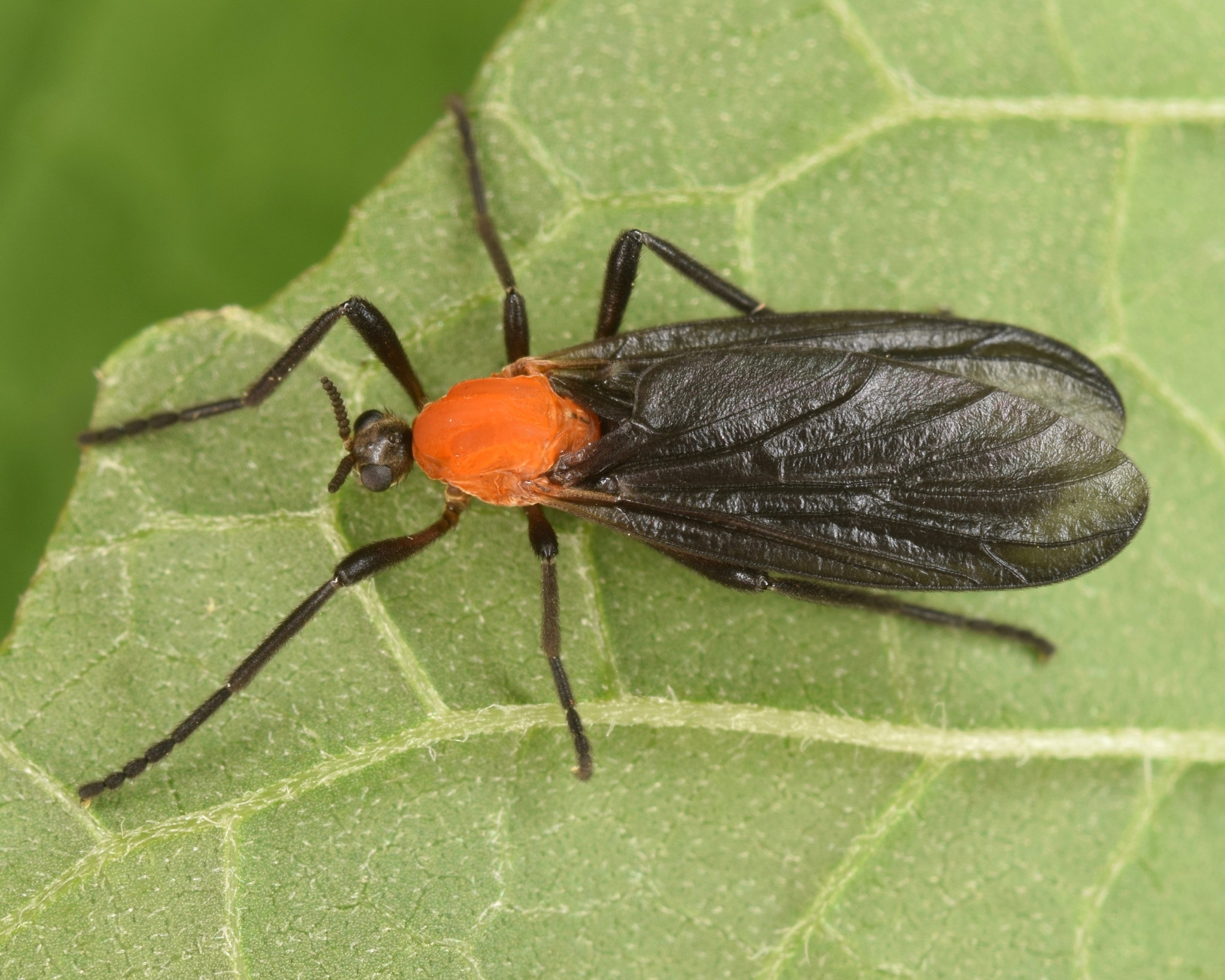

Scientific classification
- Domain: Eukaryota
- Kingdom: Animalia
- Phylum: Arthropoda
- Class: Insecta
- Order: Diptera
- Family: Bibionidae
- Genus: Plecia
- Species: P. americana

Binomial name
- Plecia americana Hardy, 1940

= Plecia americana =

Species of fly

Plecia americana is a species of March flies, insects in the family Bibionidae.
