= International Economic Consultative Organization for Korea =

Consortium of lenders to South Korea

The International Economic Consultative Organization for South Korea (IECOK) was a consortium of lenders to the South Korean government. The South Korean government persuaded the World Bank to organize this consortium in order to facilitate and coordinate developed countries' lending activities to South Korea. The IECOK was created in 1966, and held annual meetings of members and observers until it was dissolved in 1984.

The main purpose of this consortium was to provide a forum for South Korea to meet its lenders and explain the country's economic policies, performance, and prospects and guarantee easy access to foreign capital which was absolutely needed for the successful development of the economy of South Korea.

Member countries included the United States, Japan, France, Canada, Australia, West Germany, Belgium, Italy and Taiwan. Observers are International Bank of Reconstruction and Development, International Monetary Fund, and United Nations Development Plan.
