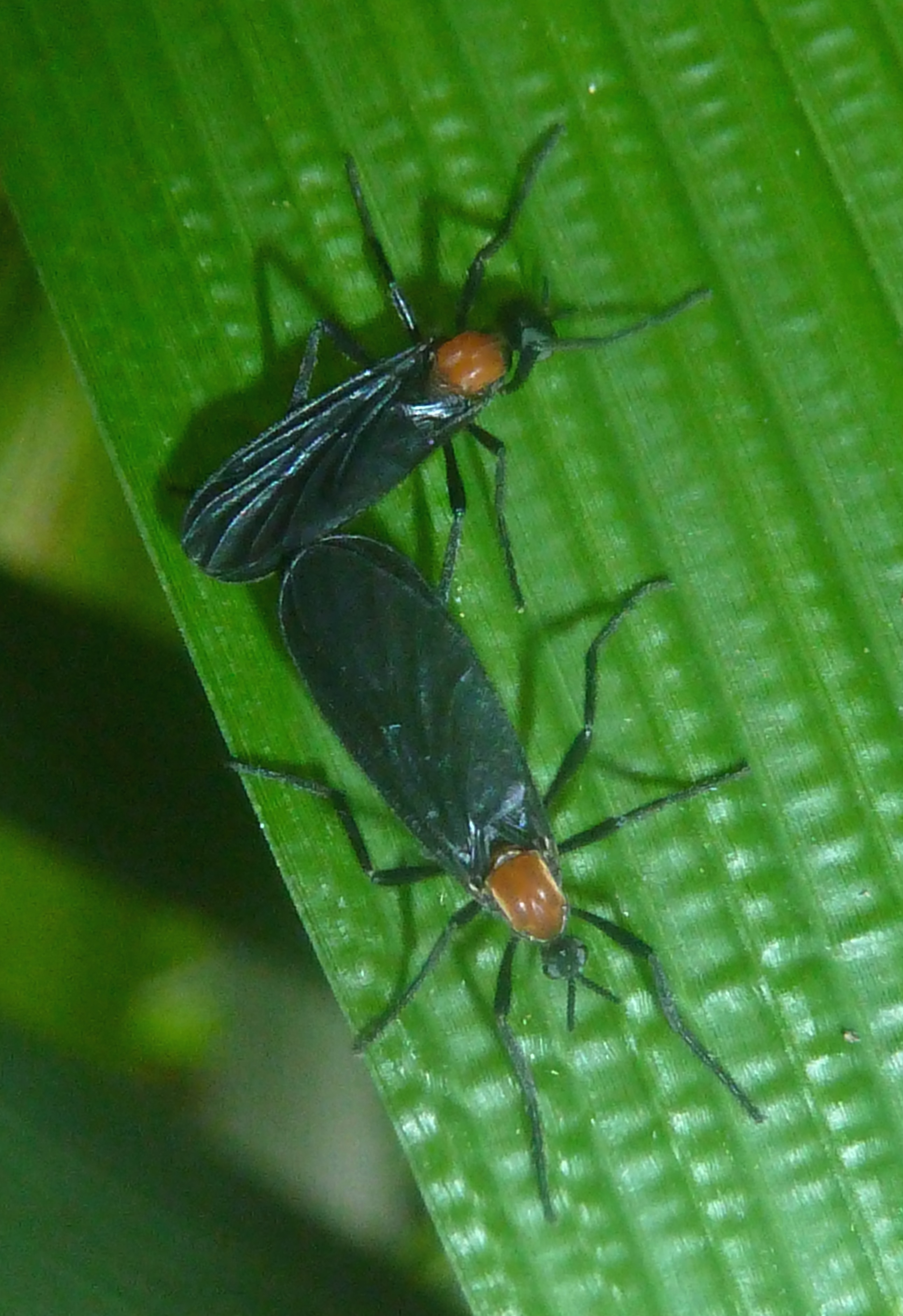
- P. ruficollis mating pair on underside of Setaria megaphylla leaf

Scientific classification
- Kingdom: Animalia
- Phylum: Arthropoda
- Clade: Pancrustacea
- Class: Insecta
- Order: Diptera
- Family: Bibionidae
- Genus: Plecia; Wiedemann, 1828

Type species
- Hirtea fulvicollis (Fabricius, 1805)

Species
- See text

Synonyms
- Heteroplecia Hardy, 1950

= Plecia =

Genus of March flies

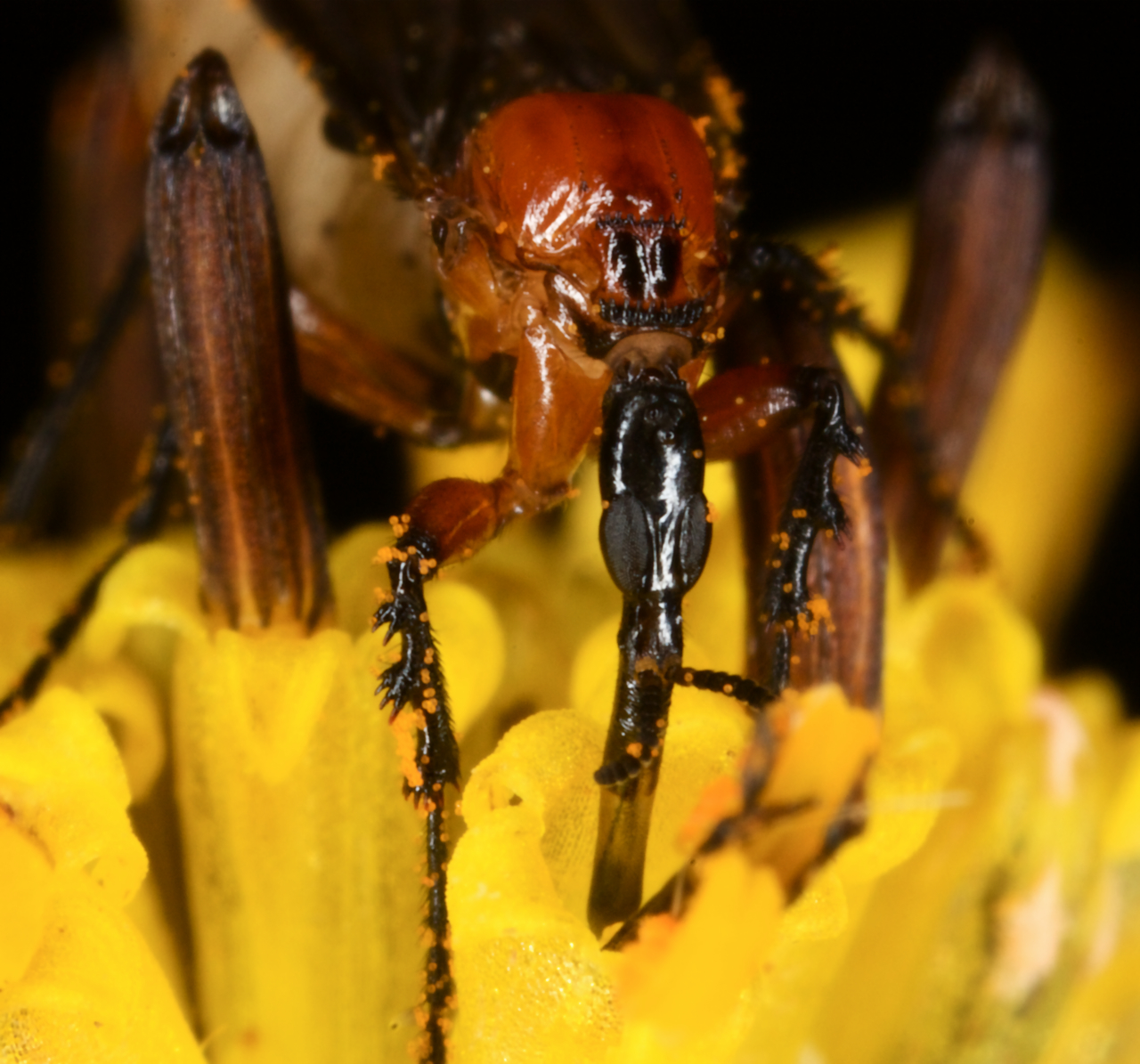
Close-up of head, P. nearctica

Plecia is a genus of March flies (Bibionidae) comprising many species, both extant and fossilised. Several species of this genus are commonly known as "lovebugs" due to their behavior of flying around coupled together while mating.

== Species ==
=== Extant species ===
- P. acutirostris Luo & Yang, 1988
- P. adiastola Hardy & Takahashi, 1960
- P. affinidecora Hardy, 1968
- P. americana Hardy, 1940
- P. amplipennis Skuse, 1888
- P. aruensis Edwards, 1925
- P. angularis Luo & Yang, 1988
- P. avicephaliforma Hardy, 1940
- P. bicuspidata Luo & Yang, 1988
- P. bifida Hardy, 1968
- P. bifoliolata Luo & Yang, 1988
- P. bisulca Hardy, 1968
- P. boliviana Fitzgerald, 1998
- P. chinensis Hardy, 1949
- P. crenula Hardy, 1968
- P. curtispina Hardy, 1968
- P. cuspidata Hardy, 1968
- P. digitiformis Luo & Yang, 1988
- P. dileracabilis Yang & Luo, 1989
- P. dimidiata Macquart, 1846
- P. duplicis Hardy, 1968
- P. edwardsi Hardy, 1940
- P. emeiensis Yang & Luo, 1989
- P. erebea Skuse, 1889
- P. erebeoidea Hardy, 1982
- P. forcipiformis Yang & Luo, 1989
- P. fulvicollis (Fabricius, 1805)
- P. hadrosoma Hardy & Takahashi, 1960
- P. hamata Hardy, 1968
- P. impilosa Hardy, 1940
- P. intricata Hardy, 1968
- P. javensis Edwards, 1925
- P. lateralis Hardy, 1940
- P. lieftincki Hardy, 1968
- P. longifolia Yang & Luo, 1989
- P. longiforceps Duda, 1933
- P. lopesi Hardy, 1940
- P. mandibuliformis Yang & Luo
- P. membranifera Hardy & Takahashi, 1960
- P. multilobata Hardy, 1968
- P. nagatomii Hardy & Takahashi, 1960
- P. nearctica Hardy, 1940 – Lovebug
- P. obtusicornis Hardy, 1968
- P. obtusilobata Hardy, 1968
- P. oculastra Hardy, 1968
- P. okadai Hardy & Takahashi, 1960
- P. ornaticornis Skuse, 1889
- P. patula Hardy, 1968
- P. pellucida Fitzgerald, 1998
- P. persimilis Hardy, 1940
- P. plagiata Wiedemann, 1824
- P. propeforcipata Hardy, 1968
- P. propria Hardy, 1968
- P. protea Fitzgerald, 1998
- P. pruinosa Hardy, 1940
- P. pudica Hardy, 1968
- P. punctulata Hardy, 1940
- P. ramosa Fitzgerald, 1998
- P. rhinigera Hardy, 1968
- P. rostellata Loew, 1858
- P. rufangularis Luo & Yang, 1988
- P. ruficollis (Olivier, 1789) – Harlequin fly
- P. rufimarginata Hardy, 1940
- P. rufiscutella Hardy, 1940
- P. rugosa Hardy, 1940
- P. serrifera Hardy, 1968
- P. spilota Hardy, 1968
- P. stricta Hardy, 1968
- P. tephra Fitzgerald, 1998
- P. tetrascolata Hardy, 1968
- P. thulinigra Hardy, 1961
- P. trifida Hardy, 1968
- P. triquetra Fitzgerald, 1998
- P. trunca Fitzgerald, 1998
- P. xyele Fitzgerald, 1998

=== Fossil species ===
Many fossil species have been assigned to Plecia with ages dating from the Cretaceous (Campanian) through the early Pleistocene (Gelasian):

==== Cretaceous ====
- †P. myersi Peterson, 1975 (Campanian, Canadian Amber, MB)

==== Paleocene ====
- †P. undans Zeuner, 1941 (Thanetian, ArdTun head, UK)

==== Eocene ====
Ypresian, Allenby Formation, Canada

- †P. angustipennis (Handlirsch, 1910)
- †P. canadensis (Handlirsch, 1910)
- †P. elatior (Handlirsch, 1910)
- †P. minutula Rice, 1959 (Allenby Formation)
- †P. nana (Handlirsch, 1910) (Allenby Formation)
- †P. pictipennis (Handlirsch, 1910) (Allenby Formation)
- †P. pulchra (Handlirsch, 1910) (Allenby Formation)
- †P. pulla (Handlirsch, 1910) (Allenby Formation)
- †P. similkameena Scudder, 1879 (Allenby Formation)
- †P. transitoria (Handlirsch, 1910) (Allenby Formation)
- †P. tulameenensis Rice, 1959 (Allenby Formation)

Ypresian, Driftwood shales, Canada

- †P. cairnesi Rice, 1959

Ypresian, Horsefly Shales, Canada

- †P. avus (Handlirsch, 1910)
- †P. curtula (Handlirsch, 1910)
- †P. dilatata (Handlirsch, 1910)
- †P. platyptera (Handlirsch, 1910) (Horsefly Shales)
- †P. reducta (Handlirsch, 1910) (Horsefly Shales)

Ypresian, "Mission Creek site", Canada

- †P. kelownaensis Rice, 1959

Ypresian, Oise amber, France

- †P. parisiensis Gee et al., 2001

Ypresian, Green River Formation, USA

- †P. akerionana Fitzgerald, 1999
- †P. dejecta Scudder, 1890
- †P. pealei Scudder, 1890
- †P. rhodopterina Cockerell, 1925
- †P. winchesteri Cockerell, 1917
- †P. woodruffi Cockerell, 1916

Priabonian, Baltic Amber

- †P. borussica Meunier, 1904
- †P. brunniptera Skartveit, 2009
- †P. clavifemur Skartveit, 2009
- †P. hoffeinsorum Skartveit, 2009
- †P. prisca Meunier, 1899
- †P. tenuicornis Skartveit, 2009

Priabonian, France

- †P. angustiventris Theobald, 1937 ( Célas site, France)
- †P. chapuisii Oustalet, 1872
- †P. dumasi Theobald, 1937
- †P. foersteri Theobald, 1937

Pribonian, United Kingdom

- †P. acourti Cockerell, 1921 (Bembridge Marls, UK)

Priabonian, Florissant Formation, USA

- †P. axeliana Cockerell, 1915
- †P. decapitata Cockerell, 1917
- †P. explanata Cockerell, 1917
- †P. gradata Melander, 1949
- †P. melanderi Cockerell, 1911
- †P. orycta Melander, 1949
- †P. tessella Melander, 1949

==== Oligocene ====
Rupelian, Brunstatt, France

- †P. gracillima Förster, 1891

Rupelian, Corent, France

- †P. joannis Oustalet, 1870
- †P. larteti Oustalet, 1870
- †P. longipennis Oustalet, 1870
- †P. pallida Oustalet, 1870
- †P. rubescens Oustalet, 1870
- †P. sauvagei Oustalet, 1870

Rupelian, Calcaires de Vacheres Formation, France

- †P. assonensis Gentilini, 1993
- †P. larguensis Gentilini, 1993
- †P. maimensis Gentilini, 1993

Rupelian, Chadrat, France

- †P. oustaleti Brongniart, 1876

Chattian, Niveau du gypse d'Aix, France

- †P. livida Heer, 1849
- †P. painvini Meunier, 1915
- †P. retracta Theobald, 1937
- †P. rhenana Heyden & Heyden, 1865

Chattian, Camoins-les-Bains, France

- †P. theobaldi Skartveit & Nel, 2017

Chattian, Rott Formation, Germany

- †P. collossea (Heyden & Heyden, 1865)
- †P. conica Theobald, 1937
- †P. dubia (Germar, 1837)
- †P. exigua Statz, 1943
- †P. gracilenta (Heyden & Heyden, 1865)
- †P. grossa Heyden & Heyden, 1865
- †P. hypogaea (Heyden & Heyden, 1865)
- †P. inflata Oustalet, 1870
- †P. luctuosa Heyden & Heyden, 1865
- †P. luteola Heyden & Heyden, 1865
- †P. lygaeoides Heer, 1849
- †P. macrocephala (Heyden & Heyden, 1865)
- †P. morio Heer, 1849
- †P. pennata Statz, 1943
- †P. pinguis (Heyden & Heyden, 1865)
- †P. proserpina Heyden & Heyden, 1865
- †P. rhenana Heyden & Heyden, 1865
- †P. sturmi Statz, 1943
- †P. stygia (Heyden & Heyden, 1865)
- †P. winnertzi (Heyden & Heyden, 1865)

==== Miocene ====
Aquitanian, Mexican amber, Mexico

- †P. pristina Hardy, 1971

Burdigalian, Shanwang Formation. China

- †P. aculeolata Zhang, 1989
- †P. bivalvula Zhang, 1993
- †P. capitata Zhang et al., 1994
- †P. diatoma Zhang, 1989
- †P. fumosa Zhang et al., 1994
- †P. gracilentula Evenhuis, 1994
- †P. ludongensis Hong & Wang 1985
- †P. platoptera Zhang, 1993
- †P. rectivenia Zhang, 1989
- †P. solaris Zhang, 1989
- †P. spinula Zhang, 1989
- †P. villosa Zhang, 1989
- †P. vulcania Zhang, 1989

Burdigalian, Kudia River site, Russia

- †P. amagua Cockerell, 1925
- †P. obsitula Cockerell, 1925
- †P. kuznetzovi Cockerell, 1925
- †P. kudiella Cockerell, 1925
- †P. redempta Cockerell, 1925
- †P. refracta Cockerell, 1925

Burdigalian - Langhian, Cypris Formation, Czech Republic

- †P. quaesita Novák, 1878

Langhian, Chojabaru Formation, Japan

- †P. kanetakii Fujiyama, 1970

Serravallian, Radoboj Formation, Croatia

- †P. bucklandi Heer, 1849

Serravallian, Oehningen beds Member (Upper Freshwater-Molasse), Germany

- †P. hilaris Heer, 1849
- †P. jucunda Heer, 1849
- †P. macilenta Skartveit & Pika, 2014

Messinian, Monte Castellaro, Italy

- †P. baglii Gentilini, 1991
- †P. castellaroi Gentilini, 1991
- †P. pisaurensis Gentilini, 1991

==== Pliocene ====
Piacenzian, Togo Formation, Japan

- †P. intima Fujiyama & Iwao, 1974

==== Pleistocene ====
Gelasian, Lac Chambon, France

- †P. brunneipennis Piton, 1939
- †P. vergnei Piton, 1935

Revision of the Bibionidae fossil record from the Oligocene of Germany by Skartveit and Wedmann (2021) included the redescription of a number of Plecia species.

- Hesperinus heeri (Heyden & Heyden, 1865) (formerly Plecia heeri and syn P. elegantula )
