= Kyeyang Electric =

South Korean manufacturing company

Keyang Electric Co, Ltd. (Korean: 계양전기) is a South Korean machinery, electric, engineering and automotive company headquartered in Seoul. It was established in 1977, and manufactures machine, tool and auto parts products, manual and auto pipe cleaner machinery. It has factories in Ansan and Cheonan. The CEO is Lee Hyeong-Ho (이형호).

== Group companies ==
- Haeseong Industry
- Hankook Paper
- Hankook Package
- Wooyeong Engineering
- Haeseong Culture Foundation
- Haeseong Academy
- Hyper CC

== Products ==
- Power Tools
- Industrial Engine
- Tool Accessory
- Sales Department Engineering Machine
- Automotive Parts

== See also ==
- Economy of South Korea
