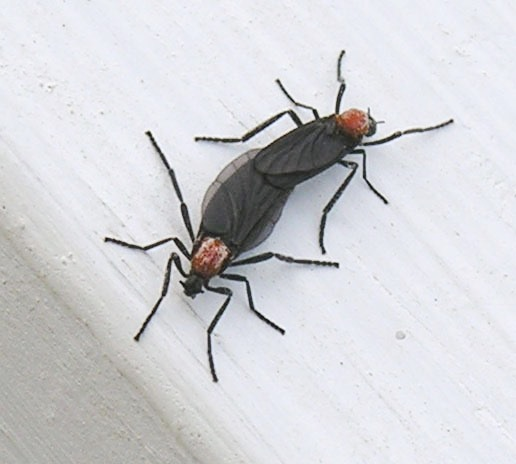
- Two lovebugs mating

Scientific classification
- Kingdom: Animalia
- Phylum: Arthropoda
- Clade: Pancrustacea
- Class: Insecta
- Order: Diptera
- Family: Bibionidae
- Genus: Plecia
- Species: P. nearctica

Binomial name
- Plecia nearctica Hardy, 1940

= Lovebug =

Species of fly

The lovebug (Plecia nearctica) is a species of march fly found in parts of Central America and the southeastern United States, especially along the Gulf Coast. It is also known as the honeymoon fly or double-headed bug. During and after mating, mature pairs remain together, even in flight, for up to several days.

The species was first described in 1940 by D. E. Hardy, though it had been observed in Louisiana as early as 1911. At the time, Hardy reported the distribution of lovebugs to be widespread, but more common in Texas and Louisiana than other Gulf States. By the end of the 20th century, the species had spread to all areas bordering the Gulf of Mexico, the entirety of Florida, and had spread as far as Georgia and South Carolina. L. A. Hetrick, writing in 1970, found the bug was also widespread in central and northern Florida and described its flights as reaching altitudes of 300 to 450 meters (980 to 1,480 ft) and extending several kilometers over the Gulf.

Lovebug larvae feed on partially decayed vegetation in the landscape and, in this respect, are beneficial to humans. Adults primarily feed on nectar from various plants, particularly sweet clover, goldenrod, and Brazilian pepper. The lovebug is considered a nuisance by many motorists, especially in the state of Florida, due to its swarming behavior during the species' mating season.

== Semi-annual pest status ==
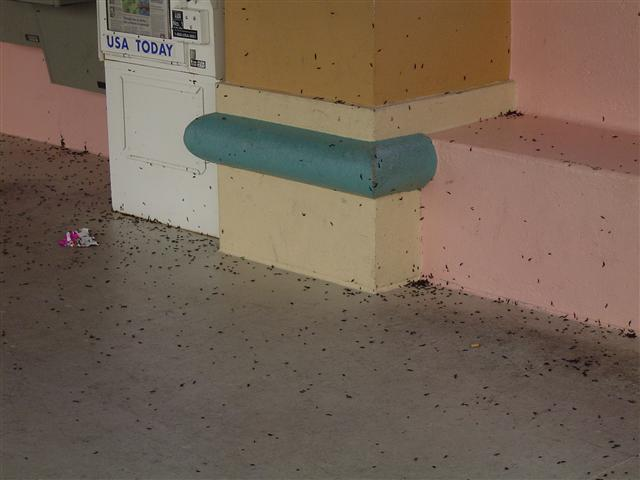
Lovebugs at a bus stop at Walt Disney World Resort in September 2006

Male/female pairs (joined tail-to-tail) will hover in the air, drifting slowly. Two major flights occur each year; the spring flight occurs during late April and May, and the summer flight occurs during late August and September. Flights extend over periods of four to five weeks. In South Florida, a third (but smaller) flight can occur in December. Mating takes place almost immediately after the emergence of the females. Adult females live only three to four days, while males live a little longer. They have to stick to each other at all times.

This species' reputation as a public nuisance is due not to any bite or sting (it is incapable of either), but to its slightly acidic body chemistry. There are no health risks to humans, as disease cannot be transmitted through them. Because airborne lovebugs can exist in enormous numbers near highways, they die in large numbers on automobile windshields, hoods, and radiator grilles when vehicles travel at highway speeds. If left for more than an hour or two, the remains become extremely difficult to remove. Their body chemistry has a nearly neutral 6.5 pH but may become acidic at 4.25 pH if left on the car for a day. In the past, the acidity of the dead adult body, especially the female's egg masses, often resulted in pits and etches in automotive paint and chrome if not quickly removed. However, advances in automotive paints and protective coatings have reduced this threat significantly. Now the greatest concern is excessive clogging of vehicle radiator air passages by the bodies of the adults, with a reduction of the cooling effect on engines, and the obstruction of windshields when the remains of the adults and egg masses are smeared on the glass.

Lovebug adults are attracted to light-colored surfaces, especially if they are freshly painted, but adults congregate almost anywhere, apparently reacting to the effects of sunlight on automobile fumes, asphalt, and other products affected by environmental factors still not completely understood.

== Folklore ==
Research by L.L. Buschman showed that migration explained the introduction of the lovebug into Florida and other southeastern states, contrary to the urban myth that the University of Florida created them by manipulating DNA to control mosquito populations.

Much speculation about the lovebug still thrives. This is partly because the larval form of this insect is seldom seen, as it lives and feeds in the thatch of grasses for most of the year. While various fungi are suspected of being natural controls for this species, biological control of these non-pest flies is not a priority for funding.

== Management ==
Lovebugs are subject to some significant natural controls, such as various parasitic fungi, and dry weather, which dries out the thatch, resulting in a higher mortality rate for the immature. As the lovebug migrated around the Gulf Coast, first to Texas, then Louisiana, then further eastward, the initial populations for many years were so excessive that they caused public concern and initiated rumors of their origin. However, as pest populations migrate naturally, their natural controls are usually not far behind. While it often took decades, lovebug flights are no longer present in the huge numbers that once existed simply because their natural controls (mostly fungi) caught up with established populations. In many areas, local lovebug flights may only be present in excessively large numbers due to occasional local conditions that may not be repeated in successive years.

While lovebugs are not a favored food of most insectivores due to their acidic taste, lovebug larvae—and some adults—are food for birds such as quail and robins. Arthropod predators include spiders, some predatory insects such as earwigs, at least two species of beetle larvae, and centipedes.

== Life cycle ==
Female lovebugs can lay as many as 350 eggs and regularly lay these eggs around decaying material on the top layer of ground soil. Lovebug eggs generally hatch after 2–4 days, depending on the flight season. Once the eggs have hatched, the larvae start feeding on the decaying material around them, such as decaying plants on the soil and other organic material, and live and remain in the soil until they develop to the pupa stage. During the warmer months the lovebug larvae remain in the larvae phase for approximately 120 days and approximately 240 days during the cooler months. Lovebugs typically stay in the pupa stage about 7–9 days before reaching the adult phase, in which they can start reproducing.

Once adults, lovebugs are ready to start copulating to begin reproducing. Adult male lovebugs emerge first from the pupal stage and hover around until female lovebugs emerge. Mating between lovebugs takes place immediately after the emergence of the adult females. A male lovebug copulates and will remain paired up until the female has been fully fertilized. Copulation takes place for 2–3 days before the female detaches, lays her eggs, and dies. Adult females have been recorded to live up to seven days, while adult males may live up to two to five days, but on average, lovebugs live three to four days. However, biologist Randy Thornhill recorded recapture data in 1976 that showed males lived longer in the field than females.

== Notes and references ==
- File: Lovebug (Plecia nearctica) spotted in Botswana, Southern Africa.jpg
