= Economy of South Korea =

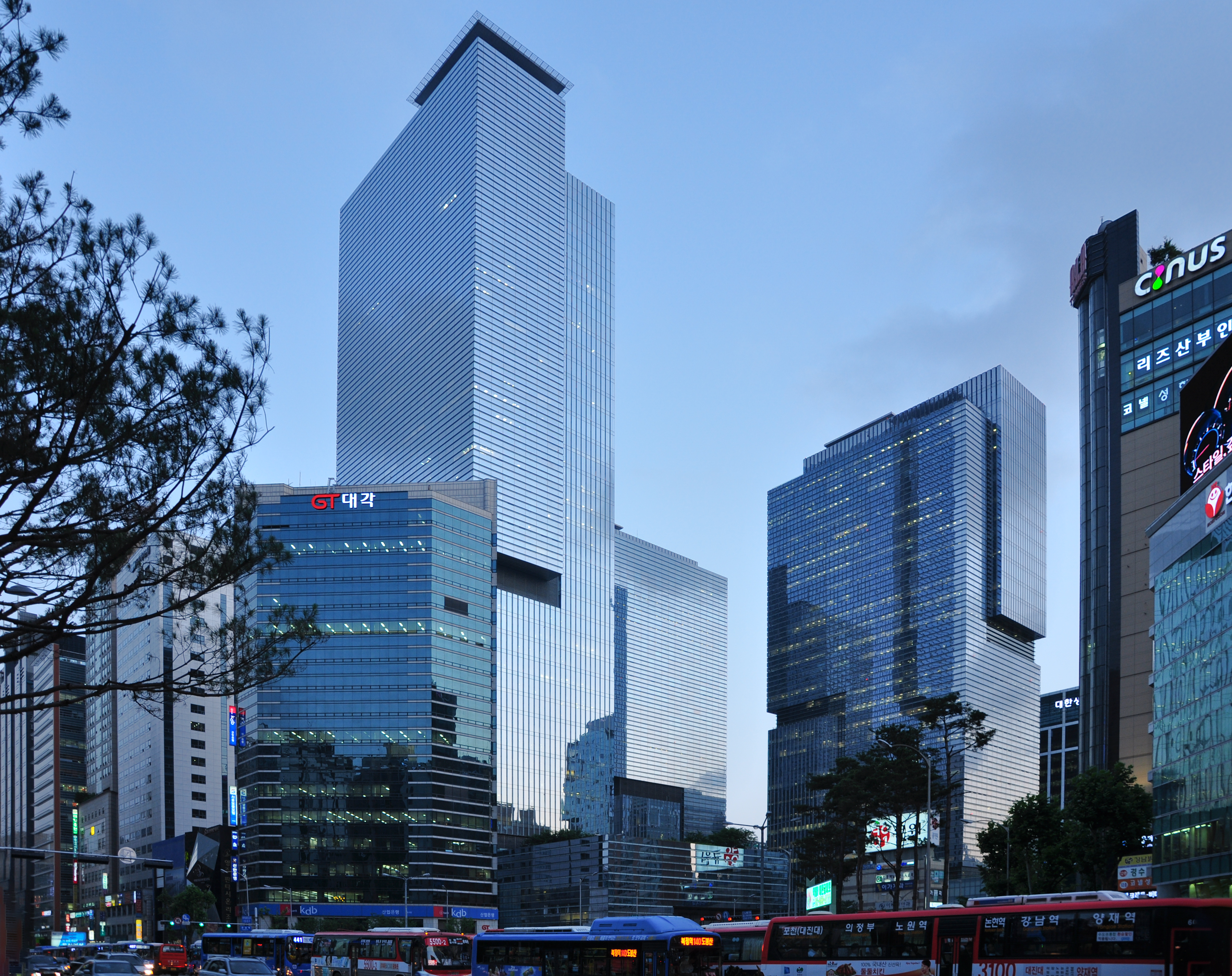
- The Seocho District located in Seoul is one of Korea's major financial and business centers.
- Currency: South Korean won (KRW, ₩)
- Fiscal year: Calendar year
- Trade organizations: APEC, WTO, RCEP, OECD, G20
- Country group: Developed economy; High-income economy

Statistics
- Population: ▲51.62 million (2026)
- GDP: ▲$2.25 trillion (nominal; 2026); ▲$3.63 trillion (PPP; 2026)
- GDP rank: 12th (nominal; 2026); 13th (PPP; 2026)
- GDP growth: 3.3% (2026); 2.8% (2027f); 2.3% (2028f)
- GDP per capita: ▲$43,512 (nominal; 2026); ▲$70,251 (PPP; 2026)
- GDP per capita rank: 30th (nominal; 2026f); 26th (PPP; 2026f)
- GDP per capita growth: 1.1% (2025)
- GDP by sector: Agriculture: 1.6%; Industry: 31.6%; Services: 58.4%; (2023 est.)
- Inflation (CPI): 2.3% (2024); 2.1% (2025); 2.7% (2026)
- Population below national poverty line: 14.4% (2016 est.)
- Gini coefficient: ▲32.9 medium (2021)
- Human Development Index: ▲0.937 very high (2023) (20th); ▲0.857 very high IHDI (2023, 18th)
- Corruption Perceptions Index: ▲64 out of 100 points (2024, 30th rank)
- Labor force: ▲28,466,640 (2020, ILO); ▲65.8% employment rate (2020)
- Labor force by occupation: Agriculture: 4.8%; Industry: 24.6%; Services: 70.6%; (2017 est.)
- Unemployment: ▲2.6% (October 2025); ▼6.4% youth unemployment (15 to 24-year-olds, 2024)
- Average gross salary: 4,583,525 ₩ / US$3,360 monthly (2024)
- Average net salary: 3,835,828 ₩ / US$2,810 monthly (2024)
- Main industries: Electronics; telecommunications; automobile production; chemicals; shipbuilding; steel

External
- Exports: ▲$709.4 billion (2025)
- Export goods: Integrated circuits 15.35%; Machinery 12.81%; Vehicles and their parts 11.34%; Mineral fuels 7.01%; Plastics 5.86%; Iron and steel 4.23%; Instruments and apparatus 4.16%; Organic chemicals 3.85%; Others 35.39%; (2019)
- Main export partners: China 23.4%; Hong Kong 4.9%; United States 17.3%; Taiwan 6.9%; Japan 4.0%; (2025)
- Imports: ▼$631.7 billion (2025)
- Import goods: Mineral fuels 25.01%; Machinery 9.17%; Integrated circuits 7.08%; Instruments and apparatus 4.88%; Vehicles and their parts 3.23%; Ores, Slags and ash 3.13%; Iron and steel 3.02%; Organic chemicals 2.62%; Others 41.86%; (2019)
- Main import partners: China 22.5%; United States 11.6%; Japan 7.8%; Taiwan 5.1%; (2025)
- FDI stock: ▲$230.6 billion (31 December 2017 est.); ▼ Abroad: $344.7 billion (31 December 2017 est.)
- Current account: ▲$421.946 billion (2026)
- Gross external debt: ▲$542.4 billion (2020)

Public finance
- Government debt: ▲39.8% of GDP (2020)
- Foreign reserves: ▲$458.700 billion (July 2021 est.)
- Budget balance: -3.5% of GDP (2020)
- Revenue: $428.7 billion (2020)
- Spending: $456.5 billion (2020)
- Economic aid: ODA, $2.4 billion (donor) (2018) aid to North Korea excluded
- Credit rating: Standard & Poor's: AA- (Domestic); AA- (Foreign); AA (T&C Assessment); Outlook: Stable; Moody's: Aa2; Outlook: Stable; Fitch: AA-; Outlook: Stable
- All values, unless otherwise stated, are in US dollars.

South Korea has a highly developed mixed economy with dirigiste characteristics. By nominal GDP, the economy was worth (US$2.25 trillion). It has the 4th largest economy in Asia and the 12th largest in the world as of 2026. South Korea is notable for its rapid economic development from an underdeveloped nation to a developed, high-income country in a few decades. This economic growth has been described as the Miracle on the Han River, which has allowed it to join the OECD and the G20. It is included in the group of Next Eleven countries as having the potential to play a dominant role in the global economy by the middle of the 21st century. Compared to other OECD members, South Korea has a smaller welfare state and spends less on its social security system; social expenditure stood at roughly 15.5% of GDP. South Korea spends around 4.93% of GDP on advanced research and development across various sectors of the economy.

South Korea's investments in education have been credited for rapidly growing its economy. South Korea began to adapt an export-oriented economic strategy in the 1960s to fuel its economy. In 2022, South Korea was the ninth largest exporter and ninth largest importer in the world. The Bank of Korea and the Korea Development Institute periodically release major economic indicators and economic trends of the economy of South Korea.

Financial institutions such as the International Monetary Fund have noted the resilience of the South Korean economy against various economic crises. They cite the country's economic advantages as reasons for this resilience, including low state debt and high fiscal reserves that can quickly be mobilized to address any expected financial emergencies. South Korea was one of the few developed countries that was able to avoid a recession during the Great Recession. South Korea's economy relies significantly on semiconductor and other AI-related gear exports, which account for around 40% of its total exports. The ratio of South Korea's exports to GDP is 46%. Consumption, by contrast, plays a relatively small role, accounting for 40% of South Korea's GDP.

South Korea’s economy demonstrates robust high growth and structural stability, underpinned by world-class technological innovation and a thriving capital market. Driven by surging global demand for high-tech industries—particularly advanced semiconductors and AI-related sectors—the country continues to reinforce its position as a leading global economic powerhouse. The economy benefits from strong export competitiveness, proactive government initiatives in digital transformation and future strategic industries, and continuous enhancements in financial market resilience, ensuring sustained economic vitality and long-term prosperity. In 2026, South Korea's export reached $1 trillion for the first time, following Germany, the United States, and China, driven by growing demand for AI semiconductors.

== History ==
=== 1940s-1950s: Post-colonization and Korean War ===
Japan industrialized Korea during its colonization for use as a supply base during its invasion of other countries. Heavy industry, however, was concentrated in northern Korea. So when the Republic of Korea was established in 1948, the country had a surplus of light industry facilities but lacked in others, such as power plants. Although some were nationalized and collectivized at first, almost all industries vested by Japanese colonialists were "gradually distributed to private entities until 1962".

After North Korea's "aggressive agricultural land reform", the Rhee administration followed by enacting the Act on Agricultural Land Reform to reduce ownership inequality. The South's plan was more conservative, expropriating through compensation and sales. By 1951, most agricultural land was redistributed and became self-cultivated.

The US started providing South Korea with aid in 1945, which was used to import "consumer goods and basic industrial products". The US forced Korea to use aid money to purchase Japanese products in order to help reconstruct the Japanese economy. Much of the aid was corruptly appropriated, some by future chaebol founders. Park Chung Hee would later use this fact to force the cooperation of the wealthy.

Rhee made "common" (elementary) education compulsory in 1949. But as the government lacked funds, schools were largely established and funded privately.

Mining and manufacturing production increased until the beginning of the Korean War, in which millions died and most production facilities were destroyed.

After the Korean War, the Rhee administration regulated imports to encourage import substitution industrialization. A recession began in the late 1950s as reconstruction and US aid slowed.

=== 1960s-1980s: Industrial expansion under military rule ===
Economy of South Korea, compared to North Korea. North Korea began to lose the economic competition after its adoption of Juche in 1974.

Having taken power in a military coup in 1961, the Park Chung Hee regime created the Economic Planning Board (EPB). South Korea's economic growth strategy in the early 1960s relied on "labor-intensive manufactured exports" due to the country's "poor natural resource endowment, low savings rate, and tiny domestic market". Government initiatives (such as encouraging foreign capital inflows) accelerated industrialization, export growth, and associated rises in income. Through the model of export-led industrialization, the South Korean government incentivized corporations to develop new technology and upgrade productive efficiency to compete in the global market. By adhering to state regulations and demands, firms were awarded subsidization and investment support to develop their export markets in the evolving international arena. Although Park was more interested in heavy industries, the EPB emphasized the development of light industries early on. Hence, the government encouraged textile firms with incentives to export. Textiles grew to 41 percent of total exports by 1965. In 1965, the Park government normalized diplomatic relations with Japan, creating an avenue for exports, supplier relationships, and technology transfer. The move was unpopular domestically, but it provided hundreds of millions of US dollars in loans and colonization compensation that the Park administration needed for its economic development plan. Although the south was initially the poorer state, South Korea's rate of growth exceeded North Korea's rate of growth in most industrial areas in the early 1960s.

Seoul's strategic emphasis on industry and exports led income disparities to grow between the industrial and agricultural sectors by the 1970s, although the government attempted to mitigate rural underdevelopment. In 1971, high grain prices were introduced alongside the Saemaul Undong. By 1970, South Korea had become a major exporter of light manufactured goods such as textile and apparel products, footwear, women's accessories, and electronics products. But due to "increasing competition and protectionism from other developing countries", the government began to change its focus from "low value-added and labor-intensive products". Beginning in 1973, South Korea's government used its National Investment Fund and the Korea Development Bank to invest large amounts of money into what Park Chung Hee's government viewed as the six strategic industries: steel, non-ferrous metals, shipbuilding, industrial machinery, electronics, and petrochemicals. This developmental approach was frequently criticized at the time from outside Korea, including by the World Bank. The strategy helped develop companies like Samsung and POSCO and reduced input costs for production in downstream industries as well. The steel and shipbuilding industries, in particular, played key roles in developing South Korea's economy during this time. The industrial transition, however, occurred amidst an oil shock, a recession, and increased foreign protectionism. And although South Korea's average income had risen, "increasingly inequitable income distribution" fed "popular dissatisfaction" throughout the decade. Amidst such conditions, Park's assassination in 1979 would be followed by a period of political upheaval.

In 1980, the Korea Fair Trade Commission was created alongside new antitrust law. South Korea's economy would temporarily decline into negative growth in 1980, unseen since 1962. Seoul controlled inflation in the 1980s through "conservative monetary policy and tight fiscal measures". Money supply was halved to 15 percent and the government budget was briefly frozen. Competition was promoted through the liberalization of import and foreign investment policies. Seoul invested in public projects and farm mechanization to address inequality. In 1985, the Plaza Accord led to the increased international price competitiveness or Korean goods compared to Japan's. By the late 1980s, South Korea's growth was increasing, inflation returned below double digits, and its balance of payments recorded surpluses. At the end of the 1980s, South Korea began to plan a shift to high-technology industries.

=== 1990s-2000s: Globalization and crises ===
South Korea joined the World Trade Organization in 1995. However, the country's rice import system was permitted to receive special treatment until 2014. After that point, South Korea would switch to a tariff-rate quota. South Korea joined the OECD in 1996. The resulting financial liberalization measures led to domestic firms and banks issuing "large amounts of short-term debt denominated in US$ to finance long-term domestic projects". Expanding aggressively, many South Korean companies became highly leveraged. Multiple chaebol began going bankrupt in early 1997.

The 1997 Asian financial crisis began after several other Asian currencies were attacked by speculators. The Korean won started to depreciate in August 1997. The problem was exacerbated due to non-performing loans at many of Korea's merchant banks. By December 1997, the IMF had approved a US$21 billion loan, which would be part of a US$58.4 billion bailout plan. The conditions of the bailout's structural adjustment program led the financial crisis to be called the 'IMF crisis' in South Korea. The Kim Dae-jung government, elected at the end of 1997, actively coordinated economic structural reforms. By January 1998, the government had shut down a third of Korea's merchant banks. More corporate groups went into bankruptcy as the economy went into recession in 1998. After Daewoo's default triggered "the collapse of the commercial paper markets", it was dismantled by the government in 1999 due to debt problems.

Much of South Korea's recovery from the 1997 Asian financial crisis can be attributed to labor adjustments (i.e. a dynamic and productive labor market with flexible wage rates) and alternative funding sources. By the first quarter of 1999, GDP growth had risen to 5.4%, and strong growth thereafter combined with deflationary pressure on the currency led to a yearly growth of 10.5%. In December 1999, President Kim Dae-jung declared the currency crisis over.

Solidarity with non-regular workers declined as regular workers increasingly focused on their narrow self-interest (H.-A. Kim, 2020, pp. 86–88). This tendency intensified in the aftermath of the 1997 East Asian financial crisis. Faced with mass layoffs, regular workers and their unions acquiesced to the increasing use of precarious/non-regular workers in exchange for job security guarantees for themselves (Song, 2014, pp. 150–153).

After the bounce back from the 1997 Asian financial crisis, the economy continued strong growth in 2000 with a GDP growth of 9.08%. In 2001, South Korea repaid its loan to the IMF. South Korea's economic growth slowed in 2001, worsened by global economic conditions partially attributable to the September 11 attacks in the United States. By 2002, rating agencies "steadily upgraded Korea's sovereign debt ratings" in recognition of the country's progress in financial and corporate reform. Led by industry and construction, growth in 2002 was 5.8%. The economy stabilized and maintained a growth rate of between 4–5% from 2003 onwards.

South Korea's first free trade agreement was signed in 2003 with Chile, despite protests from local farmers.

Like most industrialized economies, South Korea experienced setbacks during the Great Recession. Growth fell by 3.4% in the fourth quarter of 2008 from the previous quarter, the first negative quarterly growth in 10 years, with year on year quarterly growth continuing to be negative into 2009. Many sectors of the economy at the time reported declines, with manufacturing dropping 25.6% as of January 2009, and consumer goods sales dropping 3.1%. Exports in autos and semiconductors, two pillars of the economy, shrank 55.9% and 46.9% respectively, while exports overall fell by a record 33.8% in January, and 18.3% in February 2009 year on year. As in the 1997 Asian financial crisis, Korean currency also experienced massive fluctuations, declining by 34% against the US dollar. Annual growth in the economy slowed to 2.3% in 2008, and was expected to drop to as low as −4.5% by Goldman Sachs, but South Korea was able to limit the downturn to a standstill at 0.2% in 2009. Despite the Great Recession, the South Korean economy was able to avoid a recession in the first quarter of 2009 "thanks to pump-priming and rate cuts."

=== 2010s-2020s: Diplomatic disputes and pandemic ===
In 2010, South Korea made an economic rebound with a growth rate of 6.1%.

The government cut the work week from six days to five in phases, from 2004 to 2011, depending on the size of the firm. The number of public holidays was expanded to 16 by 2013.

In the late 2010s, the South Korean economy was impacted by conflicts in foreign relations, such as China's response to THAAD deployment by South Korea and the Japan–South Korea trade dispute.

In 2016, Hyundai Merchant Marine was put under state control after its bailout. Hanjin Shipping, one of the world's largest container shippers, was declared bankrupt in February 2017. The bankruptcy left HMM as the country's only major shipping line.

"I ask that as you try to overcome management difficulties, that you do not start with restructuring or layoffs but instead with sharing wisdom and pain, by trying as much as you can to save the jobs of our workers."

— Park Geun-hye (2012)

The Park Geun-hye government's regulation loosening layoff conditions was scrapped in 2017 after she was ousted. In 2018, President Moon Jae-in capped working hours and raised the minimum wage rapidly.

The South Korean economy decreased in the first quarter of 2019, which happened to be its worst drop since the Great Recession. GDP declined a seasonally adjusted 0.3 percent from the previous quarter.

Due to the sudden evolution of COVID-19, private consumption decreased, and a bottleneck in the supply sector occurred. With this situation, the Bank of Korea indicated that the consumer inflation rate rose about three percent after COVID-19 evolved. Assuming that South Korea's interest rate was low compared to other countries, raising house prices and household debt became one of the problems in South Korea's economy.

As part of its response to the COVID-19 pandemic, the government introduced sizeable fiscal and liquidity support, including expanded employment-retention subsidies, emergency cash transfers, and loan-payment deferrals and guarantees for firms; measures the OECD later noted helped preserve jobs and limit household income losses.

In April 2020, the government introduced two relief programmes: ₩40 trillion Key Industry Stabilization Fund, via the Korea Development Bank, to temporarily provide financing to sectors affected by the COVID-19 shock, and a temporary increase in the existing Employment Retention Subsidy (고용유지지원금) paid to employers who put workers on furlough instead of laying them off. To reach workers outside employment insurance, a temporary emergency employment stabilization allowance was introduced for "special-type" workers - which includes the self-employed and contractors - with pandemic-related income declines, with payments totalling ₩1.5 million over three months.

The government had to incur a massive fiscal spending in 2020, leading to a rise in the fiscal deficit as projected in their budget. Moreover, their forecasted debt-to-GDP ratio jumped to 41.2% of GDP in 2020 from 37.1% of GDP in 2019. In 2021, the government unveiled a $29 billion extra budget to aid small businesses and boost employment.

In July 2022, South Korea's consumer price index rose 6.3 percent, the highest rate since November 1998.

Policy announcements in 2022–2023 included continued financial forbearance for small businesses and SMEs through extensions of loan maturities and repayment deferrals, alongside targeted relief for high energy costs via expanded energy vouchers for low-income households.

The government also convened strategy meetings aimed at strengthening competitiveness in semiconductors and rechargeable batteries, and in March 2023, the government expanded tax incentives and other support intended to strengthen competitiveness in high-tech manufacturing, including semiconductors and rechargeable batteries.

In April 2025, the incorporation of Korean government bonds into the "World Government Bond Index" was postponed from November 2025 to April 2026. After being listed as a prospective candidate for incorporation in September 2022, it was successfully included in the regular market classification report in the second half of October 2024.

== Sectors ==
=== Agriculture and fishing ===
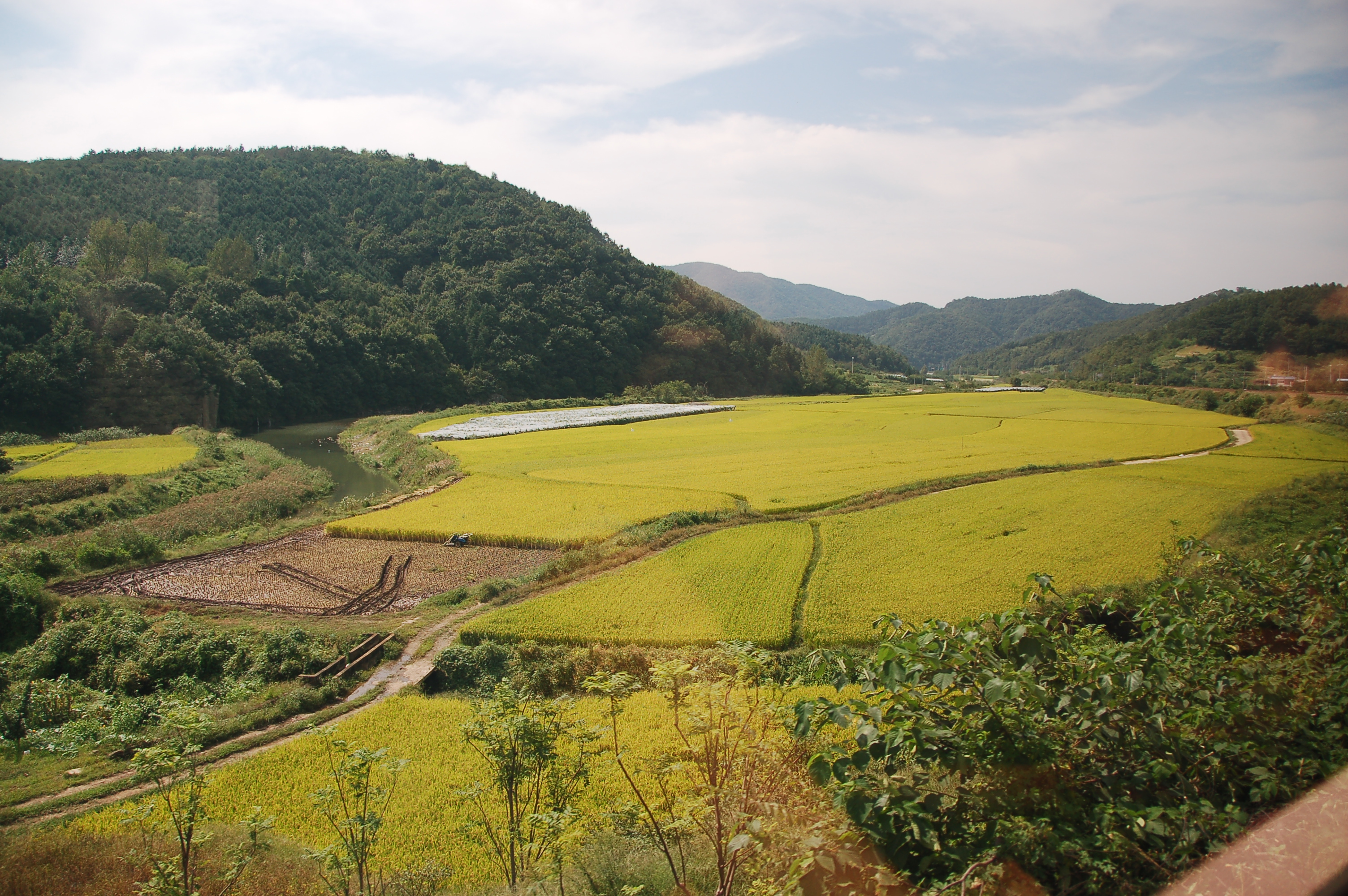
Cultivated fields in Gyeongju, South Korea (2006), display intensive use of land, dominated by the rice crop.

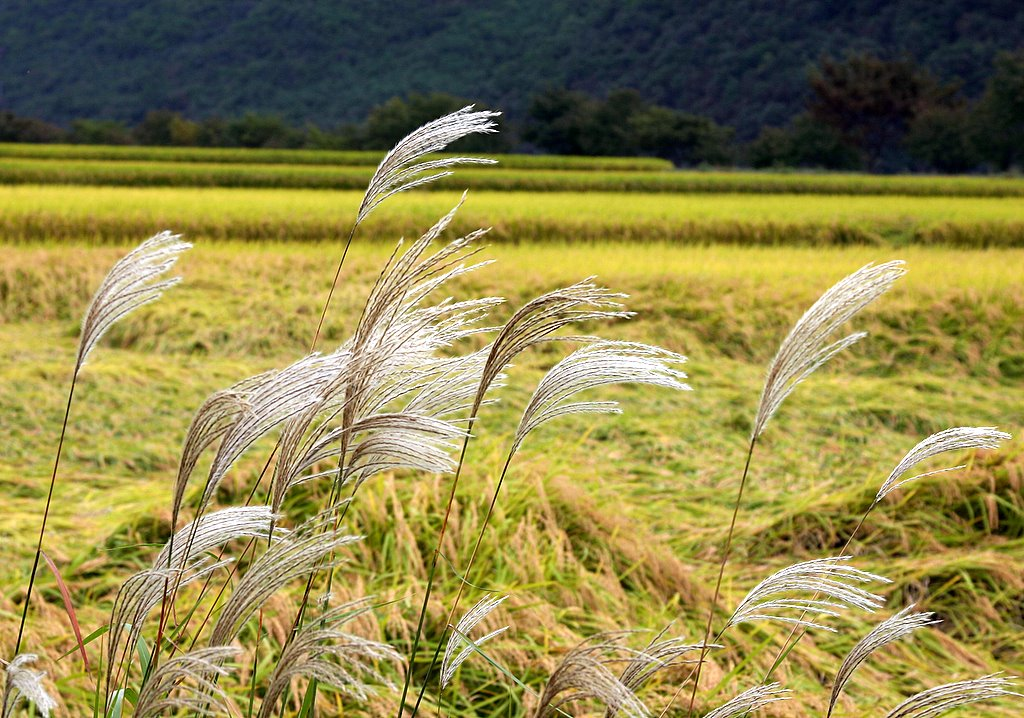
Andong-Hahoe Folk Village (2005) showing high-productivity rice field

Agriculture in South Korea is a sector of the economy of South Korea. Korean agriculture is the basic industry of the Korean economy, consisting of farming, animal husbandry, forestry and fishing. At the time of its founding, Korea was a typical agricultural country, with more than 80% of the population engaged in agricultural production. After land reform under the Syngman Rhee administration, economic revitalization under the Park Chung-hee military government and the wave of world trade liberalization that began in the 1980s, Korean agriculture has undergone dramatic changes. Through the Green Revolution, Korea became self-sufficient in rice, the staple food, in 1978, and in 1996, Korea became the first Asian country after Japan to mechanize its agriculture with fine-grained cultivation. The development of Korean agriculture has also led to the development of agriculture-related industries such as fertilizer, agricultural machinery and seed.

The natural resources required for agriculture in South Korea are not abundant. Two thirds of the country are mountain and hill. Arable land only accounts for 22 percent of the country's land. It is one of the countries with the least arable land per capita in the world. Korea has a very low self-sufficiency rate for agricultural products, except for rice and potatoes, which are largely self-sufficient, while 85% of other foodstuffs need to be imported. In addition, Korea imports more than 60% of its beef, fish and shellfish, 20% of its fruit, poultry and milk from abroad, and only sugar and eggs are self-sufficient. Since the 1980s, with the restructuring of Korean agriculture, the area of food crops has tended to decrease, while the area of high value-added crops, vegetables and fruits has increased in proportion to the plantation industry. The most important crop in South Korea is rice, accounting for about 90 percent of the country's total grain production and over 40 percent of farm income. Other grain products heavily rely on imports from other countries. Farms range in size from small, family-owned farms to large corporations, but most are small-scale and rely heavily on government support and services in order to survive.

In the 1960s, Korea's economy began to grow at a rapid pace, creating the "Han River Miracle". In 2005, the share of agriculture in Korea's GDP fell to 2.9 percent from 50 percent at the start of the country's history. With urbanization and industrialization, Korea's agricultural population has been lost and is aging, with the proportion of people employed in agriculture falling from 50% to 8.5% between 1970 and 2000, and to 7% in 2008.

Until the 1960s, agriculture and fishing were the dominant industries of the economy of South Korea. The fishing industry of South Korea depends on the existing bodies of water that are shared between South Korea, China and Japan. Its coastline lies adjacent to the Yellow Sea, the East China Sea and the Sea of Japan, and enables access to marine life such as fish and crustaceans.

=== Manufacturing ===
The strengths of South Korean weapons firms is that they are able to produce equipment that is of high quality, at short notice and at relatively cheap prices. And that has been important for the economy as a whole because South Korea for a long time relied too heavily on six or seven sectors. And while South Korea is still strong in semiconductors, cars and ships, we have lost other sectors — such as chemicals — to China.

— President Lee Jae-myung (2026)

The South Korean government began boosting light industries in the 1960s. Government focus shifted to heavy and chemical industries in the mid-1970s. In the late 1980s, manufacturing wages saw "dramatic increases" due to labor stoppages and a scarcity of labor. Investment transitioned to high-tech industries in the 1990s. The country's growth in manufacturing began to stagnate in the mid-2000s.

==== Arms ====
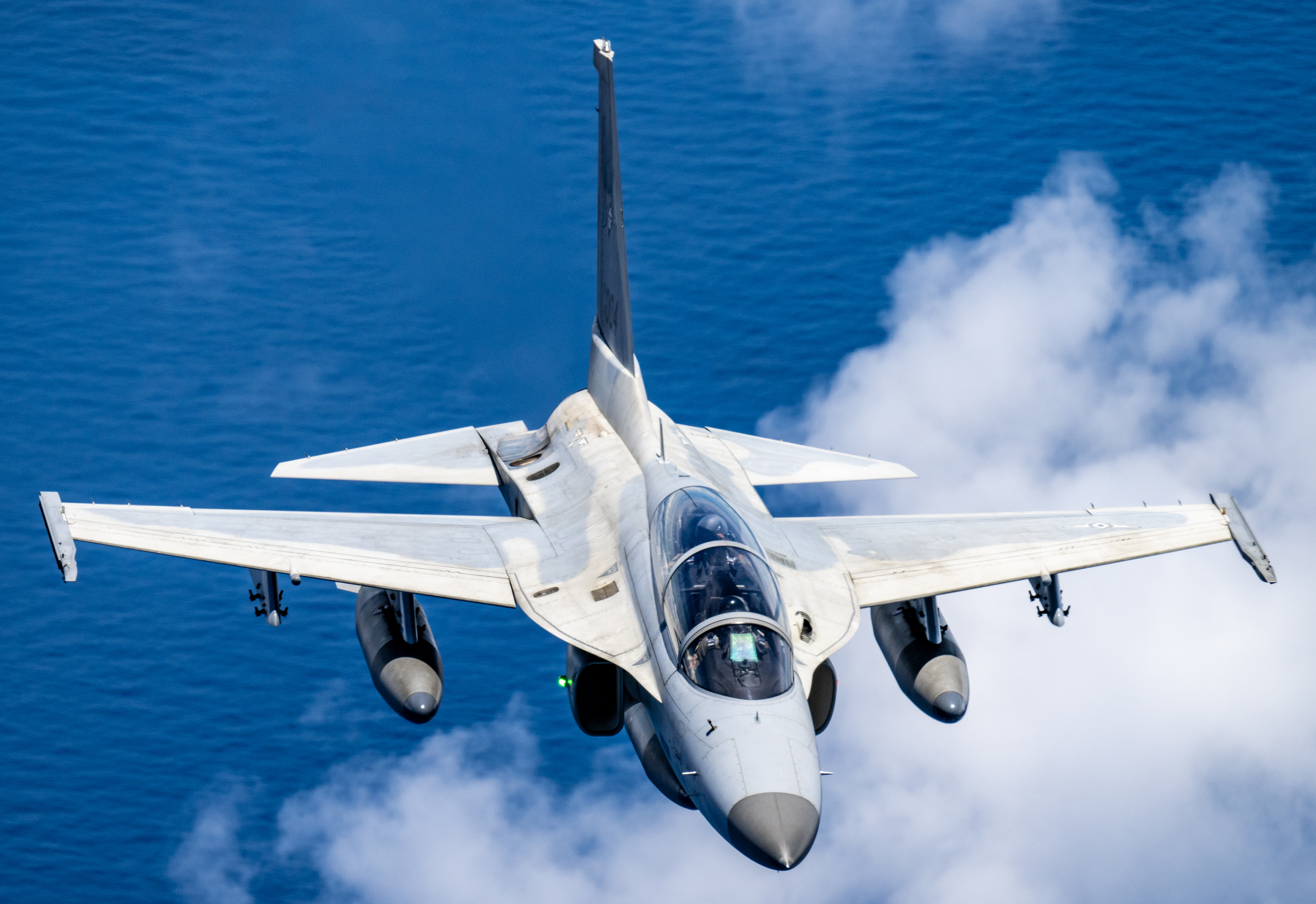
FA-50 Fighting Eagle, developed by Korea Aerospace Industries

South Korea depended on the United States for supplying its armed forces in the 1960s. In the 1970s, South Korea started to manufacture weapons due to Richard Nixon's Vietnamization policy. South Korea began to co-produce arms and military vehicles with the United States and other countries. Ammunition, naval vessels and aerospace components were South Korea's main arms exports until the mid-2010s. By the 2020s, South Korean arms manufacturers could produce weapons quickly and at relatively low costs. South Korea has sold aircraft, warships, submarines, and military ground vehicles to nations on various continents. The number of countries importing South Korean arms increased from four in 2022 to twelve in 2023.

==== Automobile ====
When Hyundai was building the Gyeongbu Highway (connecting Seoul to Busan) in the mid-1960s, President Park is said to have asked Chung Ju- yung, the founder of Hyundai: “Do you know anything about cars?” Chung answered that he had run an auto repair shop in Seoul during and after the Second World War. Then the president urged him to start producing passenger cars: “You’re building the road. Now we need cars.”

In the 1960s, South Korean companies began assembling vehicles for foreign automakers. The first car designed and manufactured in South Korea was made by Kia in 1974. South Korea's first automobile exports occurred in 1976.

Kia acquired Asia Motors in 1976 and Shinjin Motors was acquired by Daewoo in 1978. The ownership of SsangYong Motor, which also once operated under Daewoo, changed hands multiple times.

Besides, says Mr. Yoshida, "if Japanese makers do not give them technology, Korean makers will get it from the United States and Europe. It's better to be a partner than to be a competitor."

During the 1980s, the South Korean government restricted automotive companies' product categories to reduce overlap and overinvestment.

More acquisitions occurred amidst the 1997 Asian financial crisis. After Kia went bankrupt, Hyundai Motor Company acquired 51% of the company in 1998. In 2000, Renault acquired Samsung Motors. General Motors, a shareholder in Daewoo Motors, acquired the company in 2002. In the following decades, Hyundai Motor Group rose to become one of the largest automakers in the world.

==== Battery ====
South Korean companies began developing batteries in the 1980s and began production at the end of the 1990s. They started supplying EV batteries in 2009. In 2011, South Korea became the world's top battery producer after overtaking Japan's market share in small lithium-ion batteries. In July 2021, the Moon Jae-in government announced the "K-battery strategy", South Korea's first "comprehensive, battery-specific state industrial policy". In the 2020s, South Korean companies began to transition away from EVs to energy storage due to demand.

==== Electronics ====
Founded in 1959 for radio assembly, Goldstar's production expanded to television receivers, telephones, and home appliances within a decade. Following normalized diplomatic relations with Japan in 1965, South Korean firms began supplying Japanese firms. This provided an avenue for technology transfer in more technology intensive sectors. Samsung and Daewoo established electronics firms after government policy in 1969 offered easy credit access, tax breaks, and infrastructure. They both began production with television sets. Taihan, once South Korea's largest electronics firm, was later absorbed by Daewoo.

Goldstar, Samsung, and Daewoo all produced as subcontractors to foreign firms. The government allowed chaebols to establish joint ventures with foreign firms, with the long-term goal of producing advanced electronics products. Foreign electronics companies were attracted to South Korea by low-cost female labor, long annual work hours, and favorable export manufacturing policies. In 1972, a total of 8 foreign firms accounted for approximately a third of the country's electronics production. After the mid-1970s, foreign firms began shifting assembly out to other countries in Asia. But their share in exports stayed above 40% until 1980.

Laws passed in 1983 restricted low-end computer-related imports and restricted foreign direct investment in the sector to Korean joint ventures. Hyundai entered the electronics sector in 1983. Samsung, Lucky-Goldstar, and Hyundai began building plants overseas in the late 1980s. SK began producing telecommunications equipment in 1995.

In the early 1990s, the South Korean government and local firms adopted the digital cellular technology CDMA. This was in contrast to global brands, which mostly chose GSM. The government's CDMA-only mobile service licenses hence protected the domestic market from such foreign competitors. The South Korean firms initially exported CDMA phones but eventually incorporated GSM technology as well. Samsung eventually overtook Nokia to become the world's largest mobile phone producer in 2012. LG, once the world's third-largest mobile phone maker, announced its exit from the business in 2021.

Samsung and LG entered the LCD market in 1995. They focused on R&D of TFT-LCD earlier than countries such as Japan or Taiwan. By the early 2010s, South Korea held a majority share of the flat panel display market. In 2018, China's LCD market share exceeded that of South Korea for the first time. In 2007, mass production of OLED began in South Korea. South Korea's majority market share in OLED gradually decreased after China entered the market in 2015.

===== Semiconductor =====
Semiconductor manufacturing in South Korea began in the 1960s with the assembly operations of American companies. Korea Semiconductor (Note: Some sources include "South" in front of the name or transliterate the company's name (ex: "Hanguk Semiconductor") to avoid confusion with the broader industry.) was established in 1974. Samsung Group acquired Korea Semiconductor (Note: The acquisition timeline differs based on the source. Some sources also do not delineate the merger history.) and renamed it to Samsung Semiconductor in 1978. In 1979, LG acquired Daehan Semiconductor and eventually created Goldstar Semiconductor. In 1983, Hyundai entered the semiconductor industry with a focus on memory devices.

In the 1980s, there were dozens of agreements in which US semiconductor companies sold or licensed chip technology to South Korean companies. The transfers occurred amidst the dominance of Japanese companies and a slump in the industry. However, more than half of the licensing agreements between 1962 and 1985 were with Japan. The royalties were lower than agreements with the United States.

In 1983, Samsung decided to enter the dynamic random access memory chip business. It made 64KB DRAM chips the same year, becoming the third company in the world to do so. Goldstar, on the other hand, positioned itself as a supplier to American companies and manufactured logic and custom chips. In 1992, Samsung developed the world's first 64MB DRAM chip and took the lead in global DRAM market share.

After the 1997 Asian financial crisis, Hyundai and LG merged chip operations as a part of the Kim Dae-jung administration's order for conglomerates to exchange business units and reduce investment overlap. As of 1998, Samsung Electronics, Hyundai Electronics, and LG Semicon had been the country's leading DRAM producers. In 2001, Hyundai Electronics changed its name to Hynix and received government approval to be spun off from Hyundai Group. That year, Hynix was saved from a debt crisis by creditors. Financial support of Hynix from government-owned banks drew both domestic and international criticism. In 2005, Hynix overtook Micron in memory chip production, becoming second only to Samsung. After years of Hynix failing to find new owners, SK Telecom acquired a controlling stake in 2011.

In 2017, Samsung Electronics replaced decades-long leader Intel as the world's largest chip maker by revenue. In October 2020, SK Hynix agreed to buy Intel's NAND business. After becoming a supplier of high bandwidth memory chips for Nvidia, SK Hynix overtook Samsung Electronics to become the top memory chip producer in the world for the first time in 2025. In June 2026, Samsung Electronics was dethroned as the country's most valuable listed company for the first time in over 25 years by SK Hynix.

==== Pharmaceutical ====
The first new drug developed in South Korea was Sunpla, a gastric cancer treatment developed by SK Chemicals. In 1999, it was approved in the country. Factive, an antibiotic for treating "pneumonia and flare-ups of chronic bacterial bronchitis" developed by LG Life Sciences, was the country's first novel chemical drug approved by the U.S. FDA. Approved in 2011, Pharmicell's stem cell therapy product was the world's first to be mass-produced. Remsima, developed by Celltrion, was the first monoclonal antibody biosimilar in the world. It was approved by the European Medicines Agency in 2013. Samsung Biologics, a contract manufacturing organization, completed constructing the world's largest "single-site biologics drug manufacturing facility" in 2017.

==== Shipbuilding ====
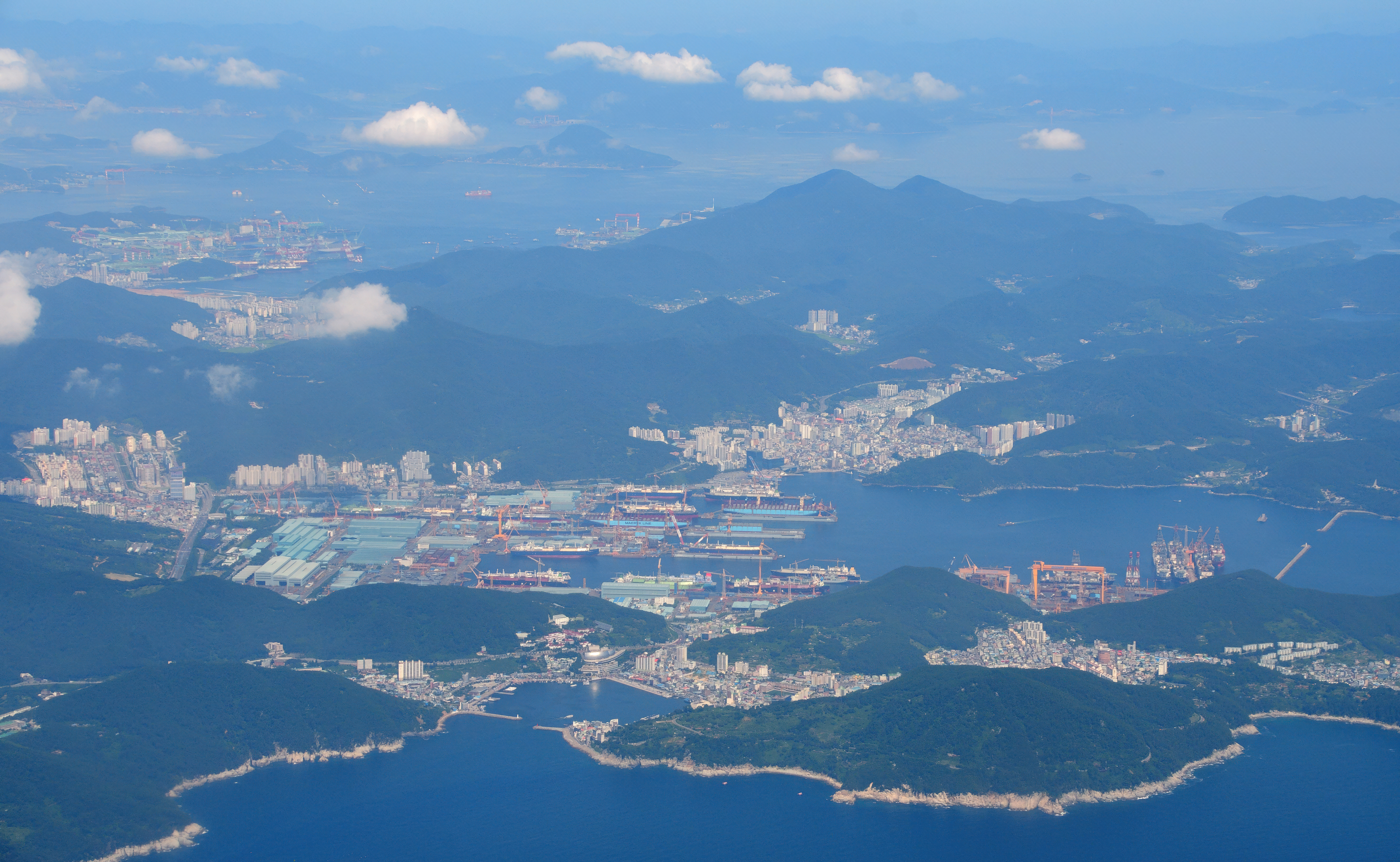
Hanwha Ocean Okpo Shipyard in Geoje

South Korea's companies have engaged in both warship and commercial shipbuilding, which are "typically separate endeavours".

Under the "Shipbuilding Industry Promotion Law" of 1967, the government provided both state-owned and private companies funding. With government support, South Korea's shipbuliding industry transitioned from wooden ships to steel. South Korea initially focused on commercial shipbuilding but began building warships amidst North Korea's naval superiority in the late 1960s and doubts about U.S. commitment after maritime provocations. The government's focus in the early 1970s was small multi-purpose gunboats for use along the Northern Limit Line. Hyundai Engineering and Construction created a shipbuilding division in 1970, which was incorporated in 1972 as Hyundai Shipbuilding and Heavy Industries (later renamed Hyundai Heavy Industries).

Between 1977 and 1978, Samsung and Daewoo entered the shipbuilding business through acquisitions. The government subsidized Hyundai Heavy Industries (HHI) to build the first domestic destroyers from 1978 to 1980. By the early 1980s, HHI was the world's largest shipbuilder. The "oil glut" and global recession led to an industry decline in the mid-1980s. Labor unrest, a lack of government support, and Japanese competition decreased orders in the late 1980s. Although many Western countries discontinued shipbuilding when the Soviet Union collapsed, North Korean threats sustained South Korea's demand for warship development. In 2003, South Korea overtook Japan in shipbuilding. From 2003 to 2011, South Korea ranked first in the world for shipbuilding.

The first company to do it, STX Shipbuilding Co., solved the problem of getting the ship from land to water by building a pulley system into the ground at its shipyard in Jinhae, Korea, three years ago. Now, the company builds a ship in two halves above the system. When done, the halves, still propped up on their supports, are placed on wheels, pulled onto a barge with pulleys and welded together. Then, the barge travels a short distance to the nearby port and partially sinks, allowing the new ship to float free.

The technique frees ships from the tight constraints of a dry dock, allowing them to be built in bigger sections. That means less work for cranes and fewer connections for welders and pipe fitters.

Orders declined amid the 2008 global economic crisis and competition from China. South Korea regained the top spot in global shipbuilding orders in 2018, mainly driven by LNG carriers. In January 2022, the European Commission blocked the acquisition of Daewoo Shipbuilding Marine Engineering by Hyundai Heavy Industries. The commission stated that the combined firm would have a majority share of the market for large LNG carrier construction. After a failed acquisition attempt in 2009, Hanhwa Group became the largest shareholder in DSME in May 2023, renaming it to Hanwha Ocean.

==== Steel ====
Starting in the late 1960s, government policies gave firms entering the heavy and chemical industries support in areas such as credit access, tax breaks, and infrastructure. Due to the initial investment required for steel, the Pohang Iron and Steel Company (POSCO) was created under state ownership in 1968. As a part of normalizing relations in 1965 and colonial compensation, Japan provided financial and technical assistance in creating a steel complex in Pohang. POSCO has since been ranked as one of the highest-output steel producers in the world.

In 1998, the South Korean government agreed to sell shares of POSCO to the public as a part of IMF reforms amidst the 1997 Asian financial crisis. Hanbo Iron & Steel, the country's second-largest steelmaker before its collapse, defaulted on its debt in 1997. Creditor banks rejected Pohang's offer for select Hanbo facilities. In 2004, two arms of Hyundai Motor Group bought Hanbo.

As of 2009, POSCO was the primary steel producer in South Korea, followed by Hyundai Steel. At the time, a lack of blast furnace facilities led to a "chronic shortage of steel" in the country. In 2014, POSCO sold its stake in its specialty steel-making arm to SeAH. As of 2016, cheap Chinese products flooded the domestic steel plate market, which was faltering due to a slump in the shipbuilding industry. As of 2025, rebar suffered from "persistent oversupply" amidst a prolonged decline in construction. In 2026, the government implemented stricter oversight over the tracking information of imported steel to help enforce antidumping tariffs.

Over the years, various South Korean steelmakers such as Hyundai Steel and Dongkuk Steel have been fined for collusion by the KFTC.

=== Mining ===
Iron ore was the country's top export in the early 1960s. The decreasing profitability of domestic mining led to the closure of various mines. South Korea's graphite production declined significantly after the 1960s. In 2010, the country had one active molybdenum mine as it reoponed NMC to increase mineral self-sufficiency. In 2014, almost all mining production in the country was for non-metallic minerals by small companies. These minerals included kaolin, limestone, and silica.

==== Coal ====
As of 1988, there were 374 coal mines in the country. In the following years, over three hundred mines were shut down due to government initiatives. As of 2016, 3 publicly and 2 privately run coal mines were in service. As of 2025, only a private coal mine remained after the shutdown of the last state-run mine. Most coal produced in the country has been anthracite.

==== Tungsten ====
In 1916, tungsten was discovered in Sangdong. In the 1960s, the Sangdong mine accounted for 70% of South Korea's export earnings. In 1994, the mine closed amidst cheaper supplies from China. The mine was relaunched in 2026 amidst concerns overreliance on China.

=== Construction ===
Breakwater construction in Seosan coast (1984)

South Korea has had some of the largest construction companies in the world. Samsung, for example, has been involved in the construction of multiple buildings that were the tallest in the world at the time, including the Petronas Towers, Taipei 101, and the Burj Khalifa.

Korean companies learned construction and civil engineering skills through contracts from South Korea's 1965 agreement with the United States to dispatch troops in Vietnam. By 1981, the majority of construction work by South Korean companies took place overseas, particularly in the Middle East. By the end of the decade, focus shifted to a "rapidly growing domestic market."

=== Education ===
Education in South Korea is provided by both public schools and private schools with government funding available for both. South Korea is known for its high academic performance in reading, mathematics, and science, consistently ranking above the OECD average. South Korean education sits at ninth place in the world.

The education system in South Korea is known for being very strict and competitive. Students are expected to get into top universities, especially the "SKY" universities (Seoul National University, Korea University and Yonsei University). While this focus has helped the nation's economy grow and boost the rate of education of its people, the issues that arise from this has left much up for debate.

=== Energy ===
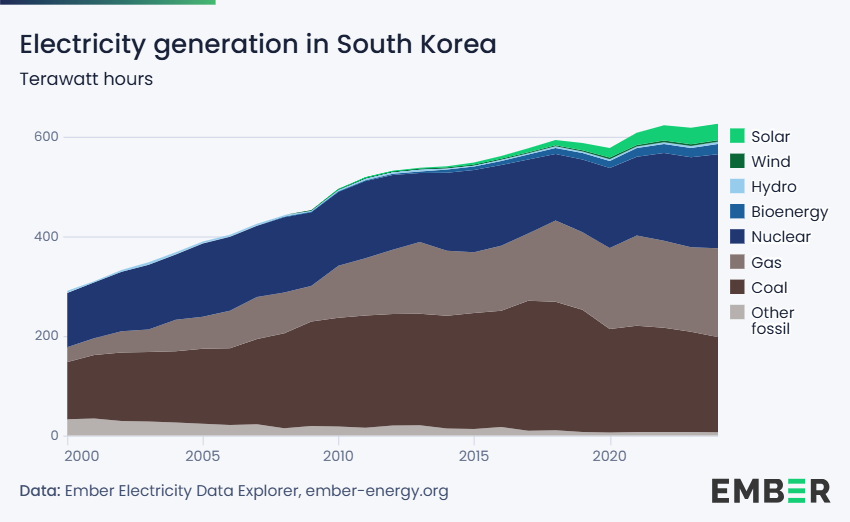
Electricity generation in South Korea in terawatt hours

South Korea is a major energy importer, importing nearly all of its oil needs and ranking as the third-largest importer of liquefied natural gas in the world in 2024. Electricity generation in the country mainly comes from conventional thermal power, which accounts for more than two thirds of production, and from nuclear power.

Energy producers were dominated by government enterprises, although privately operated coal mines and oil refineries also existed. The National Assembly enacted a broad electricity sector restructuring program in 2000, but the restructuring process was halted amid political controversy in 2004 and remains a topic of intense political debate.

South Korea has no proven oil reserves. Exploration until the 1980s in the Yellow Sea and on the continental shelf between Korea and Japan did not find any offshore oil. The Donghae-1 gas field produced natural gas between 2004 and 2021, and natural gas exploration off the east coast was started in 2024.

Coal supply in the country is insufficient and of low quality. The potential for hydroelectric power is limited because of high seasonal variations in the weather and the concentration of most of the rainfall in the summer. As of 2017, South Korean President Moon Jae-in has vowed to end the country’s reliance on coal and also said the nation would move away from nuclear energy. He has taken a major step in that direction in June, saying his country would not try to extend the life of its nuclear plants, would close existing coal-fired plants, and would not build any new coal plants.

In recent years, South Korea has set a new direction for its energy sector, with significant decarbonization goals, aiming to raise the share of electricity from renewable sources from 6% in 2019 to 35% by 2030.

=== Finance and banking ===
In 1950, the "Bank of Korea was established as the central bank". In 1954, South Korea began to privatize banks due to issues created by the Banking Act. Industrial capitalists borrowed money from the banks in order to bid for them. The Park Chung Hee government later re-nationalized most banks. As chaebols could not control banks, they began to use nonbank financial subsidiaries for funding. This made measures in the 1970s and 1980s tightening credit to chaebols that had risky debt levels "inadequate". The government denationalized several banks in the mid-1980s. After the 1997 Asian financial crisis, the Financial Supervisory Board shut down and consolidated numerous merchant banks. In 1997, the Kim Dae-jung government deregulated credit cards to stimulate consumer spending. By 2003, millions of South Koreans "had defaulted on credit card debt". LG Card was bailed out after running out of cash.

=== Healthcare ===
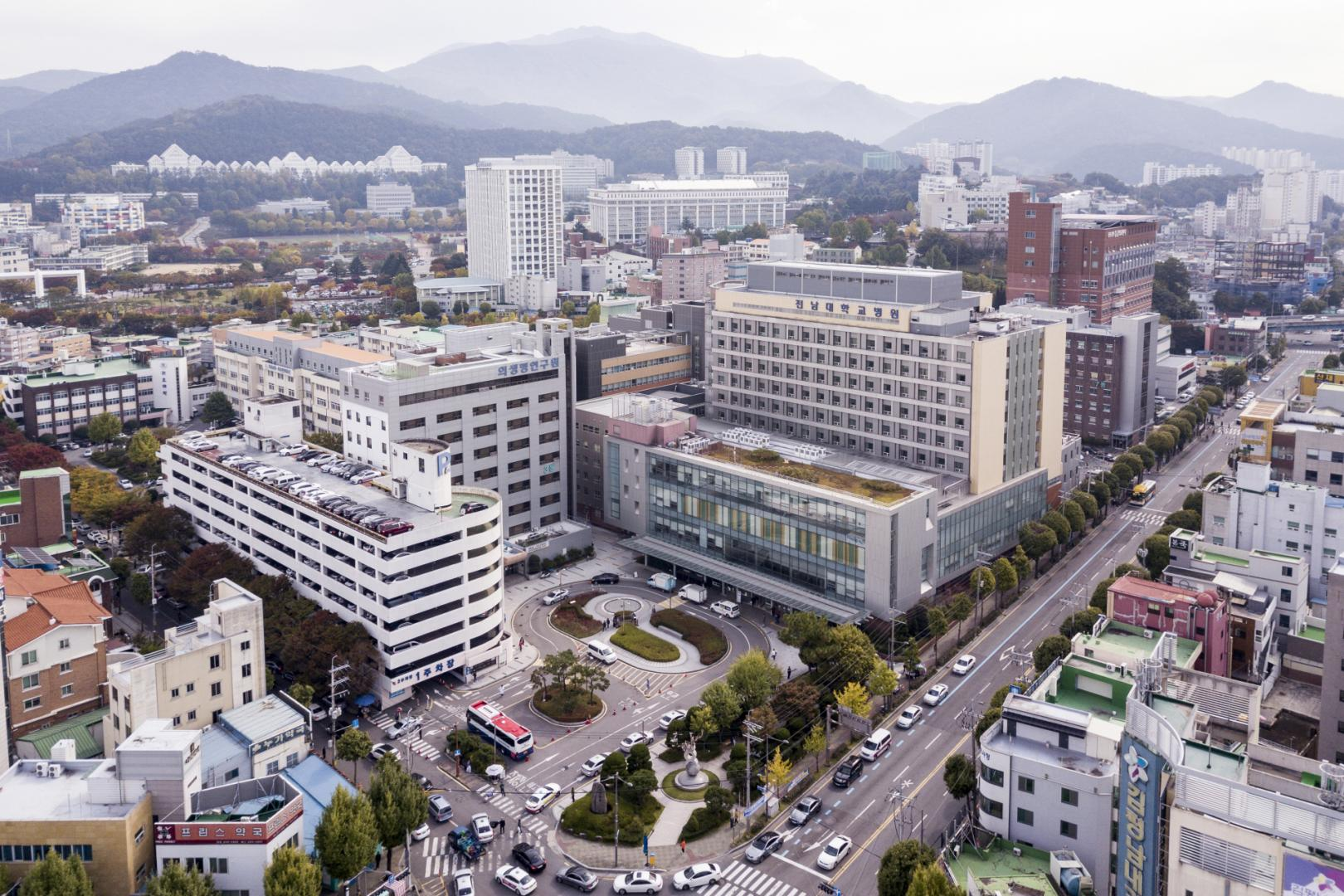
Chonnam National University in Gwangju

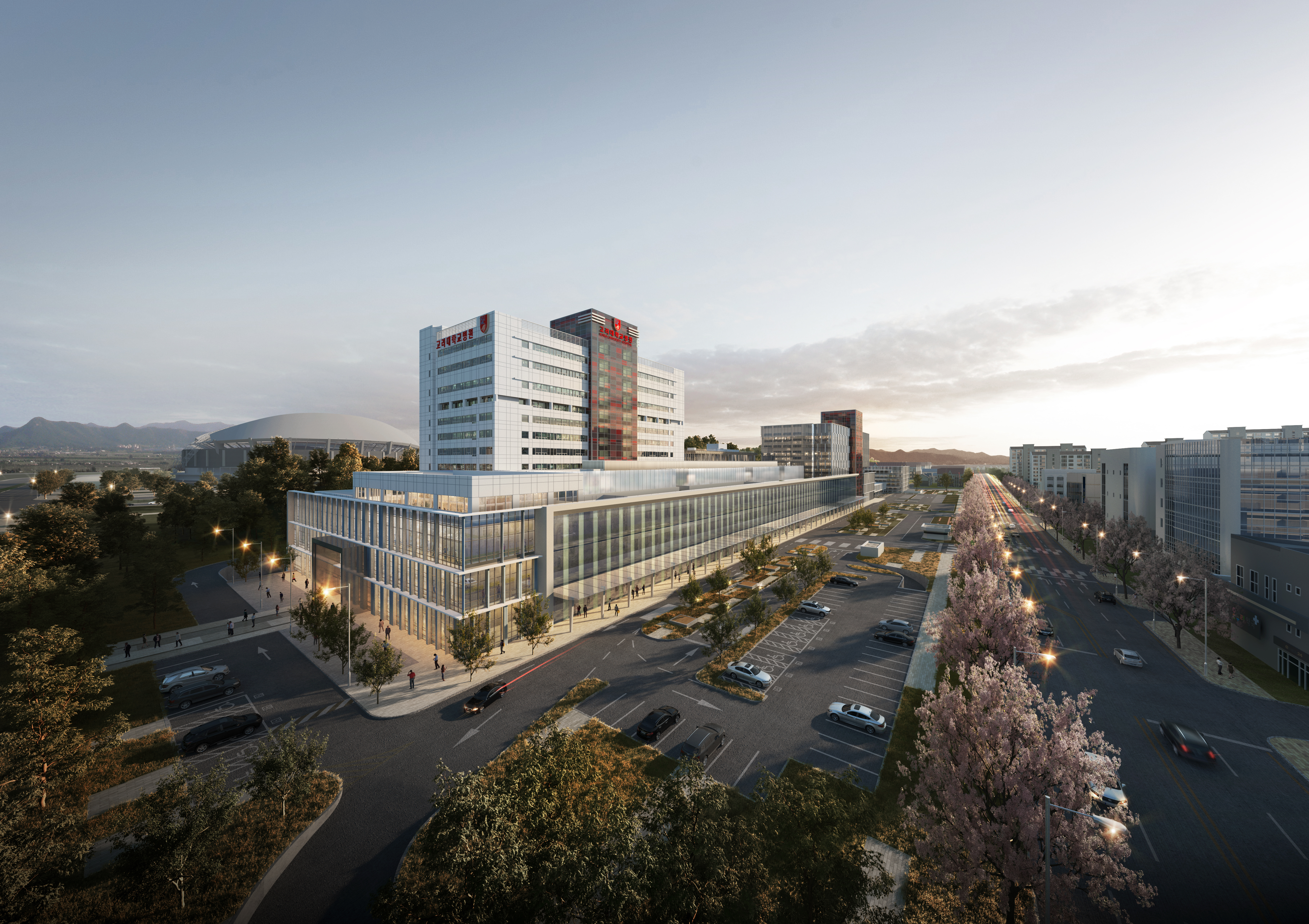
Korea University Medical Center Korea University in Seoul

Healthcare in South Korea is universal, although a significant portion of healthcare is privately funded. South Korea's healthcare system is based on the National Health Insurance Service, a public health insurance program run by the Ministry of Health and Welfare to which South Koreans of sufficient income must pay contributions in order to insure themselves and their dependants, and the Medical Aid Program, a social welfare program run by the central government and local governments to insure those unable to pay National Health Insurance contributions. In 2015, South Korea ranked first in the OECD for healthcare access.

Satisfaction of healthcare has been consistently among the highest in the world; South Korea was rated as the second most efficient healthcare system by Bloomberg. Health insurance in South Korea is single-payer system. The introduction of health insurance resulted in a significant surge in the utilization of healthcare services.

Healthcare providers are overburdened by the government relying on their workforce. Healthcare providers are prosecuted for criminal malpractice at a much higher rate than expected for a country like South Korea, probably due to low legal protections. Patients too often cannot get treatment.

=== Housing ===
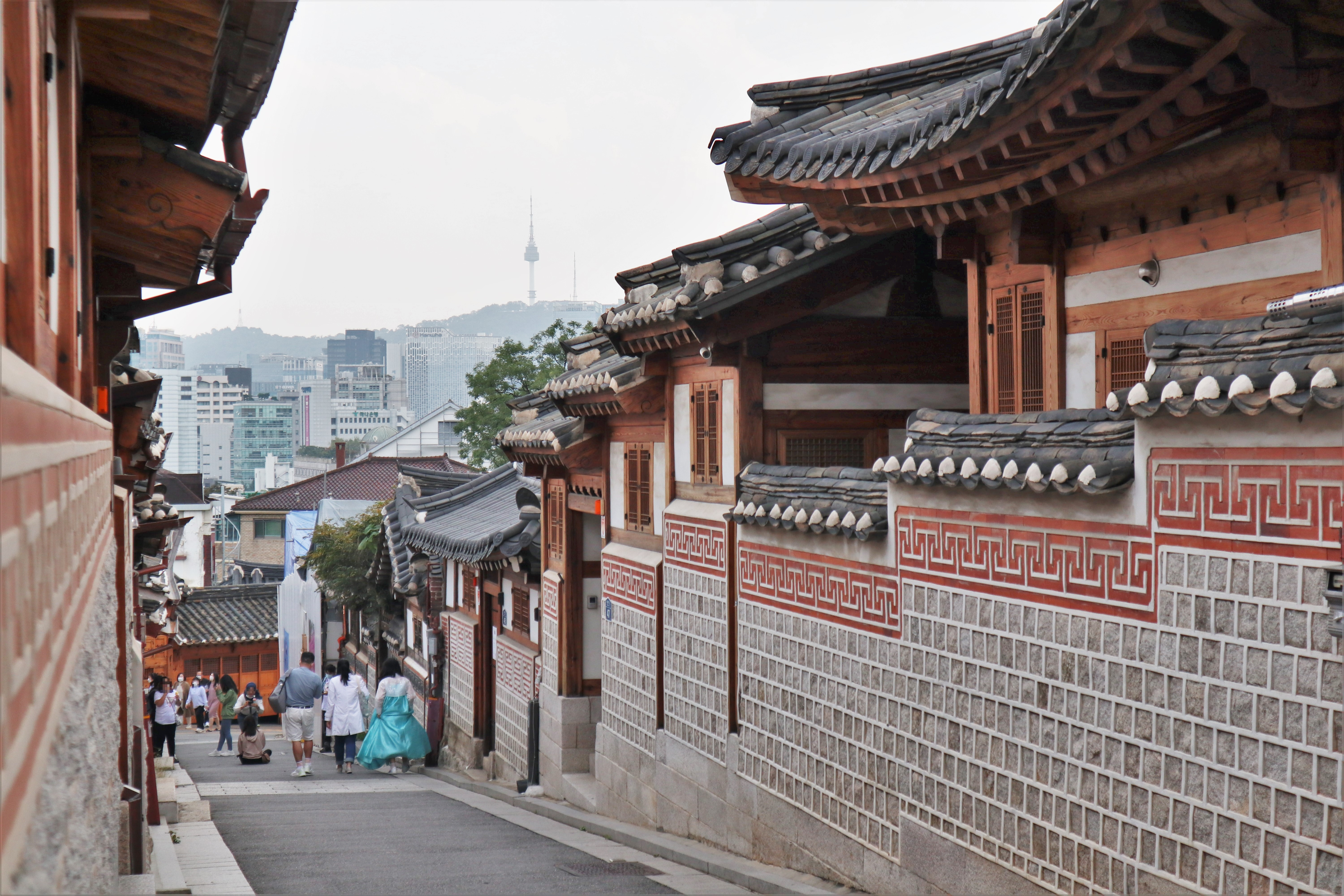
Bukchon Hanok Village in Seoul

Housing in South Korea includes detached houses, apartment (unit of apartment, row houses, and private houses), studio apartments, and dormitories in non-residential buildings such as shopping malls and factories. While the occupancy rate of apartment houses is steadily rising, the occupancy rate of detached houses is steadily falling.

=== Retailing ===
Retailing in South Korea consists of hypermarkets, department stores, flea markets, traditional markets, and underground shopping malls. Hypermarkets sell dry goods and groceries, similar to Western supercentres. Traditional markets are also popular throughout South Korea.

=== Mass media and entertainment ===
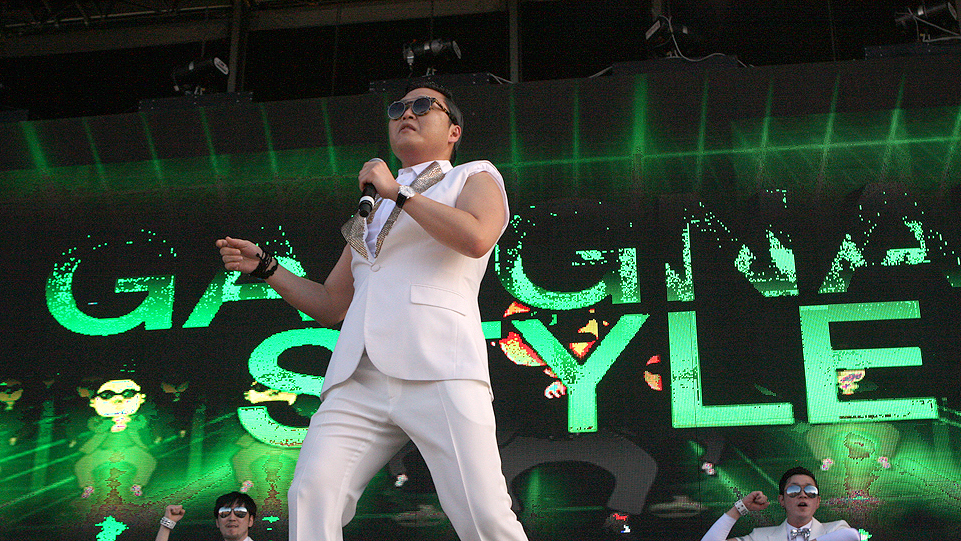
South Korean K-pop rapper Psy performing "Gangnam Style" in Sydney in 2013

The Korean Wave, or hallyu (Korean: 한류; IPA: [ˈha(ː)ʎʎu]), refers to the rise in global interest in South Korean popular culture that has spread rapidly since the 1990s. It is led by the spread of K-pop, K-dramas, K-beauty, K-food, and films, with key successes including K-pop groups BTS and Blackpink, the Oscar-winning film Parasite (2019) and the Netflix television series Squid Game (2021–2025). The Korean Wave has been recognized as a form of soft power and a significant economic asset for South Korea, generating revenue through cultural exports and tourism.

Following the 1997 Asian financial crisis and the end of military censorship over the South Korean entertainment industry, the country emerged as a major exporter of popular culture. The growth of satellite media in the late 1990s helped spread K-dramas and Korean cinema across East Asia and parts of Southeast Asia. Chinese journalists coined the term "Korean Wave" (Chinese: 韩流; pinyin: hánliú) in 1999 to describe the growing popularity of South Korean cultural products. During the 2000s, hallyu expanded into Southeast Asia, South Asia, the Middle East, and Eastern Europe. By 2008, South Korea's cultural exports surpassed its cultural imports for the first time. The rise of social media and global internet platforms helped the Korean entertainment industry reach overseas audiences and gain support from the South Korean government.

=== Telecommunications ===
In South Korea, telecommunications services improved dramatically in the 1980s with the assistance of foreign partners and as a result of the development of the electronics industry. The number of telephones in use in 1987 reached 9.2 million, a considerable increase from 1980, when there were 2.8 million subscribers (which, in turn, was four times the number of subscribers in 1972).

Radio, and in more recent years television, reached virtually every resident. By 1945 there were about 60,000 radio sets in the country. By 1987 there were approximately 42 million radio receivers in use, and more than 100 radio stations were broadcasting. Transistor radios and television sets have made their way to the most remote rural areas. Television sets, now mass-produced in South Korea, became far less expensive; most city people and a significant number of rural families owned or had access to a television. Ownership of television sets grew from 25,000 sets when broadcasting was initiated in 1961 to an estimated 8.6 million sets in 1987, and more than 250 television stations were broadcasting.

=== Tourism ===
In 2012, 11.1 million foreign tourists visited South Korea, making it one of the most visited countries in the world, up from 8.5 million in 2010. Many tourists from all around Asia visit South Korea which has been due to the rise of the Korean Wave (Hallyu).

Seoul is the principal tourist destination for visitors; popular tourist destinations outside of Seoul include the major coastal city of Busan, the Seorak-san national park, the historic city of Gyeongju, and subtropical Jeju Island.

== Science and technology ==
Science and technology in South Korea has advanced throughout the decades. The advancement of science and technology has become an integral part of economic planning in South Korea. Fast-growing industries have created a massive demand for new and more advanced technologies. Additionally, Korean engineers and scientists propose that the advancement of science and technology in partnership with North Korea could help facilitate the peaceful reunification of North and South Korea.

== Infrastructure ==
=== Transportation ===
Transportation in South Korea is provided by extensive networks of railways, highways, bus routes, ferry services and air routes that traverse the country. South Korea is the third country in the world to operate a maglev train, which was an automatically run people mover at Incheon International Airport.

=== Water supply and sanitation ===
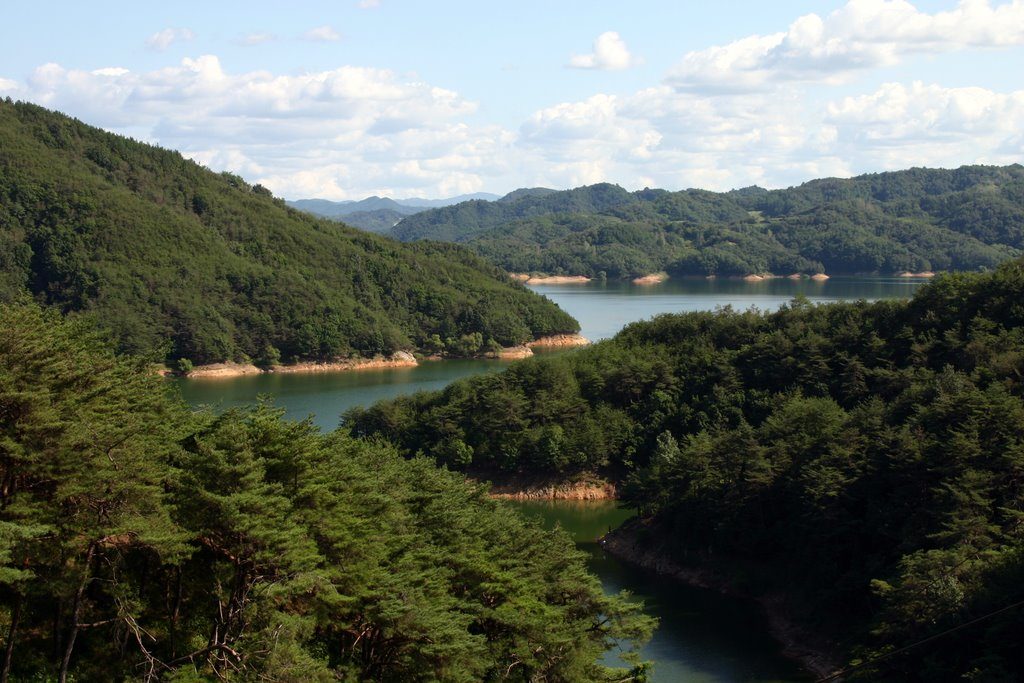
Nakdong River

South Korea's primary water source is river basins. Although South Korea's annual precipitation (1973-2007) was above the global average, precipitation per capita was relatively low. South Korea's water management policy has been revised since 1961 under the "River Basin Law". Industrialization, urbanization, population growth, and agricultural intensification in the 1970s caused a water shortage. Hundreds of reservoirs and multi-purpose dams were built to meet demand. After major drinking water contamination incidents in the early 1990s, water quality improved through the construction of treatment facilities. The 2007 revision of the River Basin Law accounted for climate change. Floods and droughts have become more intense and frequent over time, creating water quality issues. In 2018, South Korea's national water management system was integrated under the Ministry of Environment.

== Government budget and spending ==
Government expenditure in South Korea accounted for 35% of its GDP. From the 1960s to the 1980s, when Korea's economic development was concentrated, the government's finances were mainly focused on economic development. The proportion of government finances devoted to social development was relatively insignificant. The government's fiscal scale gradually expanded with the consolidated fiscal balance reaching 23.1% of South Korea GDP by 1981, but the government implemented a strong fiscal austerity policy aimed at economic stability, and the relative fiscal scale shrank significantly to the 15% range. Although targeted price stability was achieved, reduced government finance could not fulfill its original function, and the social development sector, which was relatively out of interest in government expenditure, was hit hard. Under these circumstances, the expansionary fiscal stance has been promoted "for the normalization of fiscal functions" since the 1990s.

During the Kim Young-sam administration, taxes were increased to support expansionary finances. This also led to an increase in welfare expenditure. The Kim Dae Jung administration established a welfare system by introducing the National Basic Livelihood Security System, while the Roh Moo Hyun administration set an annual welfare expenditure growth rate of 10% and tried to allocate budgets to the welfare sector first.

However, in 2008, the Lee Myung Bak government implemented a tax reduction policy that significantly lowered the tax rates of income tax, corporate tax, and comprehensive real estate holding tax. Park Geun Hye administration adopted ‘no-tax increase’ policy stance, continuing the Lee Myung Bak administration's tax reduction stance.

In the 2010s, the role of government in the national economy grew, with increasing government expenditure to support an increasing aging population. But the growth rate of the national budget varied across administrations, reflecting shifts in fiscal policy between expansionary and austerity stances. Under the Moon Jae-in administration, the 'year-on-year growth rate of the national budget' steadily increased after its inauguration in 2017, reaching nearly 9% from 2019 onward. However, with the transition to the Yoon Suk-yeol administration, the growth rate slowed to around 5% and further declined to approximately 2.5% in 2025 budget. The Lee Jae-myung administration allocated a record-high budget of 728 trillion KRW for 2026, with the year-on-year growth rate rising again to around 8%.

== Chaebol ==
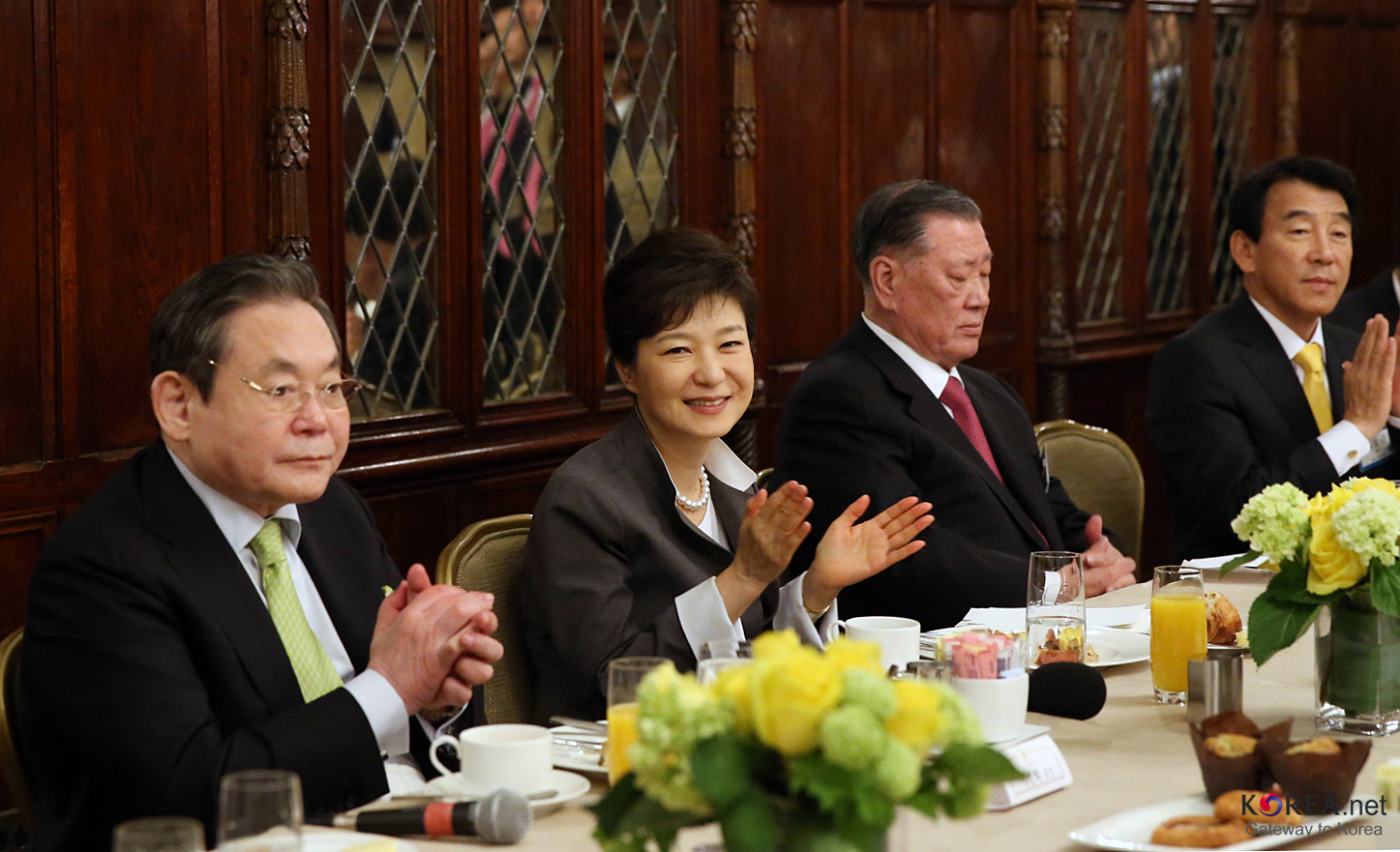
South Korean President Park Geun-hye at a breakfast meeting with chaebol business magnates Lee Kun-hee and Chung Mong-koo in 2013

A chaebol (Note: (UK: /ˈtʃeɪbəl, ˈtʃeɪbɒl/ CHAY-bəl, CHAY-bol, US: /ˈtʃeɪboʊl, ˈdʒɛbəl/ CHAY-bohl, JEB-əl;.) (Korean: 재벌; [tɕɛbʌɭ]) is a type of large industrial South Korean conglomerate run and controlled by an individual or family. A chaebol often consists of multiple diversified affiliates, controlled by a person or group. Several dozen large South Korean family-controlled corporate groups fall under this definition. The term first appeared in English text in 1972.

Although chaebol have often accounted for a majority of South Korea's GDP, their share of employment has been much smaller. Chaebol have also played a significant role in South Korean politics. In 1988, a member of a chaebol family, Chung Mong-joon, president of Hyundai Heavy Industries, successfully ran for the National Assembly of South Korea. Other business leaders were also chosen to be members of the National Assembly through proportional representation. Hyundai has made efforts in the thawing of North Korean relations, despite some controversy. Many South Korean family-run chaebol have been criticized "for low dividend payouts and other governance practices that favor controlling shareholders at the expense of ordinary investors."

== Data ==
The following table shows the main economic indicators in 1980–2025 (with IMF staff estimates for 2026). Inflation below 5% is in green.

Year	GDP (in bn. US$PPP)	GDP per capita (in US$ PPP)	GDP (in bn. US$nominal)	GDP per capita (in US$ nominal)	GDP growth (real)	Inflation rate (in Percent)	Unemployment (in Percent)	Government debt (in % of GDP)
1980	83.9	2,199.6	66.5	1,744.8	▼-1.5%	▲28.7%	5.2%	n/a
1981	▲98.6	▲2,545.9	▲74.3	▲1,918.4	▲7.4%	▲21.4%	▼4.5%	n/a
1982	▲113.5	▲2,887.2	▲79.9	▲2,032.0	▲8.5%	▲7.2%	▼4.1%	n/a
1983	▲133.9	▲3,354.5	▲89.6	▲2,245.6	▲13.5%	▲3.4%	4.1%	n/a
1984	▲153.5	▲3,798.1	▲99.8	▲2,468.7	▲10.6%	▲2.3%	▼3.9%	n/a
1985	▲170.9	▲4,187.8	▲103.8	▲2,542.9	▲7.9%	▲2.5%	▲4.0%	n/a
1986	▲194.4	▲4,716.4	▲120.0	▲2,910.8	▲11.5%	▲2.8%	▼3.8%	n/a
1987	▲224.9	▲5,402.9	▲152.2	▲3,657.7	▲12.9%	▲3.0%	▼3.1%	n/a
1988	▲261.1	▲6,211.0	▲205.5	▲4,888.7	▲12.1%	▲7.1%	▼2.5%	n/a
1989	▲290.7	▲6,848.9	▲254.2	▲5,989.2	▲7.2%	▲5.7%	▲2.6%	n/a
1990	▲331.8	▲7,740.9	▲292.1	▲6,812.9	▲10.0%	▲8.6%	▼2.5%	12.8%
1991	▲380.4	▲8,785.6	▲340.9	▲7,872.9	▲10.9%	▲9.3%	2.5%	▼11.9%
1992	▲413.8	▲9,457.8	▲366.9	▲8,386.9	▲6.4%	▲6.2%	2.5%	▼11.6%
1993	▲453.2	▲10,254.5	▲405.8	▲9,181.5	▲7.0%	▲4.8%	▲2.9%	▼10.9%
1994	▲506.3	▲11,340.3	▲479.0	▲10,729.6	▲9.4%	▲6.3%	▼2.5%	▼9.6%
1995	▲567.2	▲12,578.1	▲586.3	▲13,002.0	▲9.7%	▲4.5%	▼2.1%	▼8.5%
1996	▲623.7	▲13,700.7	▲631.2	▲13,864.9	▲8.0%	▲4.9%	2.1%	▼7.8%
1997	▲674.3	▲14,674.2	▼590.1	▼12,840.6	▲6.3%	▲4.4%	▲2.6%	▲9.7%
1998	▼648.2	▼14,004.8	▼396.8	▼8,572.8	▼-4.9%	▲7.5%	▲7.0%	▲13.8%
1999	▲733.8	▲15,740.7	▲515.4	▲11,056.7	▲11.6%	▲0.8%	▼6.6%	▲15.8%
2000	▲819.5	▲17,432.1	▲597.8	▲12,717.0	▲9.2%	▲2.3%	▼4.4%	▲16.1%
2001	▲877.5	▲18,524.3	▼567.7	▼11,983.4	▲4.7%	▲4.1%	▼4.0%	▲16.6%
2002	▲960.1	▲20,152.2	▲649.7	▲13,637.3	▲7.7%	▲2.8%	▼3.3%	▼16.4%
2003	▲1,009.2	▲21,072.4	▲728.5	▲15,211.1	▲3.1%	▲3.5%	▲3.6%	▲19.1%
2004	▲1,090.1	▲22,670.7	▲822.6	▲17,107.7	▲5.2%	▲3.6%	▲3.7%	▲21.6%
2005	▲1,173.2	▲24,349.0	▲971.5	▲20,162.9	▲4.4%	▲2.8%	▲3.8%	▲24.9%
2006	▲1,272.9	▲26,278.0	▲1,094.5	▲22,596.7	▲5.2%	▲2.2%	▼3.5%	▲27.0%
2007	▲1,383.7	▲28,422.7	▲1,220.8	▲25,075.3	▲5.8%	▲2.5%	▼3.3%	▼26.3%
2008	▲1,452.7	▲29,614.9	▼1,093.5	▼22,291.2	▲3.0%	▲4.7%	▼3.2%	▼25.9%
2009	▲1,473.7	▲29,887.6	▼982.9	▼19,933.0	▲0.8%	▲2.8%	▲3.6%	▲28.8%
2010	▲1,595.7	▲32,202.0	▲1,192.7	▲24,069.1	▲7.0%	▲2.9%	▲3.7%	▼28.3%
2011	▲1,688.7	▲33,817.5	▲1,307.2	▲26,177.9	▲3.7%	▲4.0%	▼3.4%	▲31.7%
2012	▲1,764.0	▲35,139.5	▲1,335.3	▲26,600.5	▲2.5%	▲2.2%	▼3.2%	▲33.5%
2013	▲1,853.1	▲36,746.2	▲1,434.7	▲28,449.4	▲3.3%	▲1.3%	▼3.1%	▲36.0%
2014	▲1,946.0	▲38,346.4	▲1,556.3	▲30,667.1	▲3.2%	▲1.3%	▲3.5%	▲37.9%
2015	▲2,021.4	▲39,623.1	▼1,539.2	▼30,171.8	▲2.9%	▲0.7%	▲3.6%	▲38.8%
2016	▲2,105.3	▲41,104.7	▲1,578.8	▲30,825.5	▲3.2%	▲1.0%	▲3.7%	▲39.1%
2017	▲2,216.6	▲43,155.9	▲1,710.2	▲33,297.0	▲3.4%	▲1.9%	3.7%	▼38.0%
2018	▲2,347.7	▲45,511.1	▲1,824.3	▲35,364.0	▲3.2%	▲1.5%	▲3.8%	▼37.9%
2019	▲2,407.6	▲46,511.2	▼1,751.0	▼33,826.9	▲2.3%	▲0.4%	3.8%	▲39.7%
2020	▲2,482.0	▲47,881.5	▼1,744.5	▼33,653.2	▼-0.7%	▲0.5%	▲4.0%	▲45.9%
2021	▲2,685.8	▲51,880.4	▲1,942.3	▲37,518.5	▲4.6%	▲2.5%	▼3.7%	▲48.0%
2022	▲2,955.3	▲57,193.2	▼1,799.4	▼34,822.4	▲2.7%	▲5.1%	▼2.9%	▲49.8%
2023	▲3,113.2	▲60,201.6	▲1,844.8	▲35,674.1	▲1.6%	▲3.6%	▼2.7%	▲50.5%
2024	▲3,254.4	▲62,885.5	▲1,875.4	▲36,238.6	▲2.0%	▲2.3%	▲2.8%	▼49.7%
2025	▲3,380.4	▲65,404.7	▼1,872.4	▼36,227.0	▲1.0%	▲2.1%	2.8%	▲52.3%
2026	▲3,542.0	▲68,624.3	▲1,931.0	▲37,412.1	▲1.9%	▲2.5%	2.8%	▲54.4%

The following table compares data on some of South Korea's economic indicators between 1962 and 1989.

Year	GNP (US$ billions)	Per capita annual income (US$)	Ratio of domestic savings to GNP (%)
1962	2.3	87	3.3
1989	204	4830	35.8

The following graphs illustrate economic indicators over time.

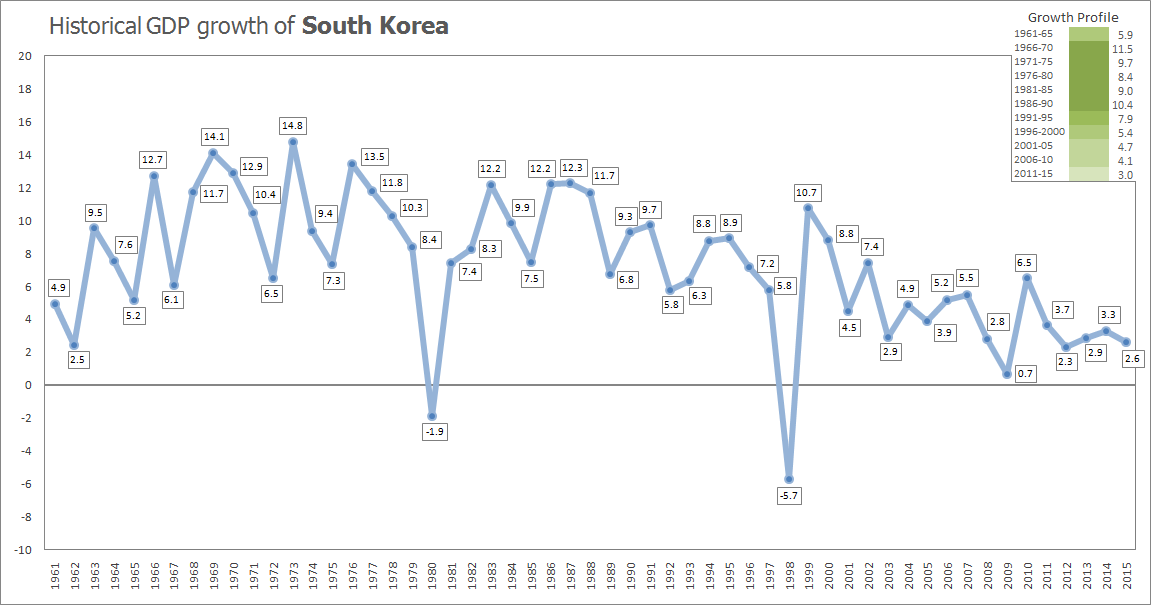
Growth of the South Korean economy 1961–2015

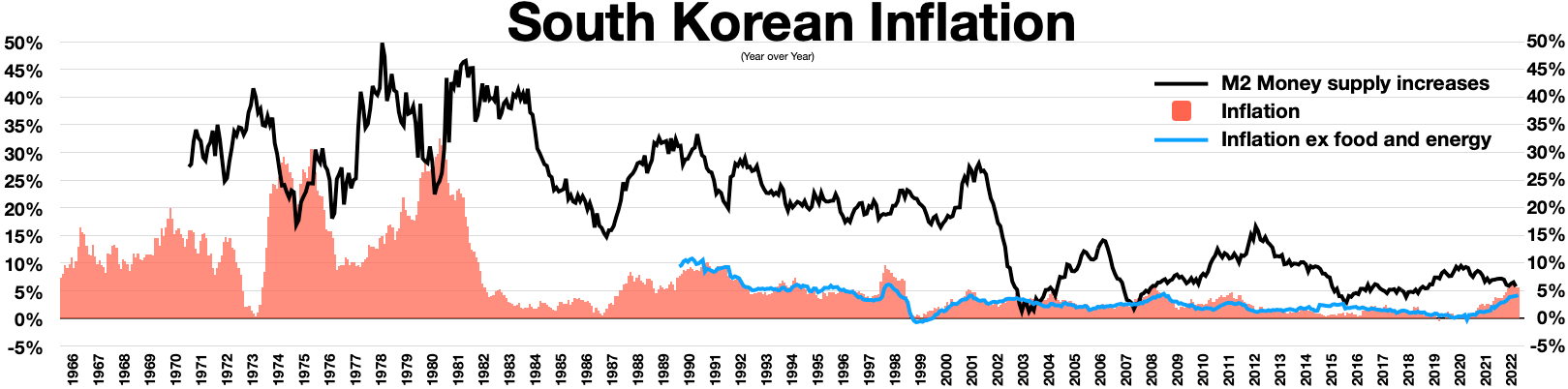
South Korean inflation

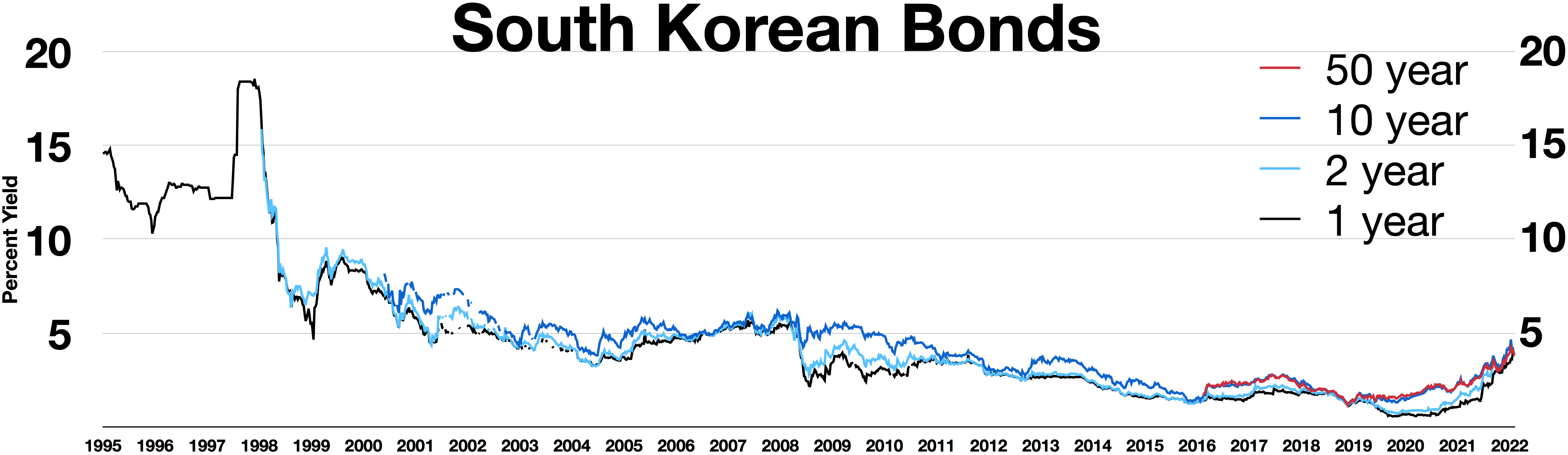
South Korean bonds

=== Economic inequality ===
According to data from 2010, low-income earners (those earning 12 million won or less) make up 37.8% of South Korea's labour force. Conversely, the highest income earners (those earning 100 million won or more) make up 1.4% of the labour force.

According to a survey in 2019, among young South Koreans, 89.3% of women and 81.7% of men agreed with the statement that "people born into poverty can never compete with [those] born into wealth".

=== Foreign trade ===
Exports of South Korea by product category (2019) Chemical products Transportation Machines Mineral products Plastics and rubbers Metals Foodstuffs Precious metals Textiles Instruments Animal products Vegetable products Paper goods Footwear and headwear Miscellaneous Stone and glass Wood products Animal and vegetable bi-products Animal hides Arts and antiques Weapons

South Korea has more than 20 free trade agreements.

2021 top South Korean exports
Product	Percentage	Exports value
Integrated circuits	17.7%	$116 (in billion)
Cars	6.85%	$44.7 (in billion)
Refined petroleum	5.57%	$36.4 (in billion)
Motor vehicle parts	2.95%	$19.3 (in billion)
Office machine parts	2.76%	$18 (in billion)
Passenger and cargo ships	2.71%	$17.71 (in billion)
Telephones	2.46%	$16.1 (in billion)
Machinery	1.78%	$11.6 (in billion)
Blank audio media	1.66%	$10.8 (in billion)
Others	55.6%	$362.39 (in billion)

2021 top South Korean imports
Product	Percentage	Imports value
Crude petroleum	10.5%	$60.6 (in billion)
Integrated circuits	8.21%	$41.4 (in billion)
Petroleum gas	4.25%	$24.5 (in billion)
Refined petroleum	4.2%	$24.3 (in billion)
Photo lab equipment	2.88%	$16.6 (in billion)
Coal briquettes	2.27%	$13.1 (in billion)
Cars	2.09%	$12 (in billion)
Machinery	1.37%	$7.9 (in billion)
Computers	1.32%	$7.6 (in billion)
Others	62.91%	$370 (in billion)

2018 Top 10 export partners
Country/Region	Export (M$)	Percentage
China	162,125	26.8%
United States	72,720	12.0%
Vietnam	48,622	8.0%
Hong Kong	45,996	7.6%
Japan	30,529	5.1%
Russia	20,872	3.4%
Taiwan	20,784	3.2%
India	15,606	2.6%
Philippines	12,037	2.0%
Singapore	11,782	2.0%
Mexico	11,458	1.9%
Others	173,201	28.6%
Total	604,860	100.0%

2018 Top 10 import partners
Country/Region	Import (M$)	Percentage
China	106,489	19.9%
United States	58,868	11.0%
Japan	54,604	10.2%
Saudi Arabia	26,336	4.9%
Germany	20,854	3.9%
Australia	20,719	3.9%
Vietnam	19,643	3.7%
Russia	17,504	3.4%
Taiwan	16,738	3.1%
Qatar	16,294	3.0%
Singapore	12,762	2.0%
Others	177,153	33.1%
Total	535,202	100.0%

2018 Top 10 positive balance (surplus) countries for South Korea
Country/Region	Balance (M$)
China	55,636
Hong Kong	43,999
Vietnam	28,979
United States	13,852
India	9,722
Philippines	8,468
Mexico	6,368
Turkey	4,791
Taiwan	4,045
Singapore	3,808
Others	−110,011
Total	69,657

2018 Top 10 negative balance (deficit) countries for South Korea
Country	Balance (M$)
Japan	−24,075
Saudi Arabia	−22,384
Qatar	−15,768
Kuwait	−11,541
Germany	−11,481
Australia	−11,108
Russia	−10,183
Iraq	−7,658
United Arab Emirates	−4,699
Chile	−2,667
Others	191,221
Total	69,657

=== Mergers and acquisitions ===
Since 1991, there has been a steady upward trend in South Korean M&A until 2018 with only a short break around 2004. Since 1991, around 18,300 deals in, into or out of South Korea have been announced, which sum up to a total value of over 941 bil. USD. 2016 has been the year with the largest deal value (1,818 in bil. USD) and the most deals (82,3).

== See also ==
- Miracle on the Han River
- Korean Wave
- List of companies of South Korea
- List of largest companies of South Korea
- List of South Korean billionaires by net worth
- List of South Korean regions by GDP
- Corruption in South Korea
- Economic inequality in South Korea
- Minimum wage in South Korea
- Poverty in South Korea
- Trade unions in South Korea
- Unemployment in South Korea
- Youth unemployment in South Korea
- Work–life balance in South Korea
- Foreign worker legislation in South Korea
- Small and medium-sized enterprises in South Korea
- South Korea and the International Monetary Fund
- South Korea and the World Bank
- Korean studies

== Sources ==
- Kim, Youna (5 November 2013), "Introduction: Korean media in a digital cosmopolitan world", in Kim, Youna (ed.), The Korean Wave: Korean Media Go Global, London: Routledge, pp. 1–27, doi:10.4324/9781315859064, ISBN 978-1-315-85906-4
- Walsh, John (20 February 2014), "Hallyu as a Government Construct: The Korean Wave in the Context of Economic and Social Development", in Kuwahara, Yasue (ed.), The Korean Wave: Korean Popular Culture in Global Context, New York: Palgrave Macmillan, pp. 13–31, doi:10.1057/9781137350282_2, ISBN 978-1-137-35027-5
