= Gyeyangsan =

Mountain in Incheon, South Korea

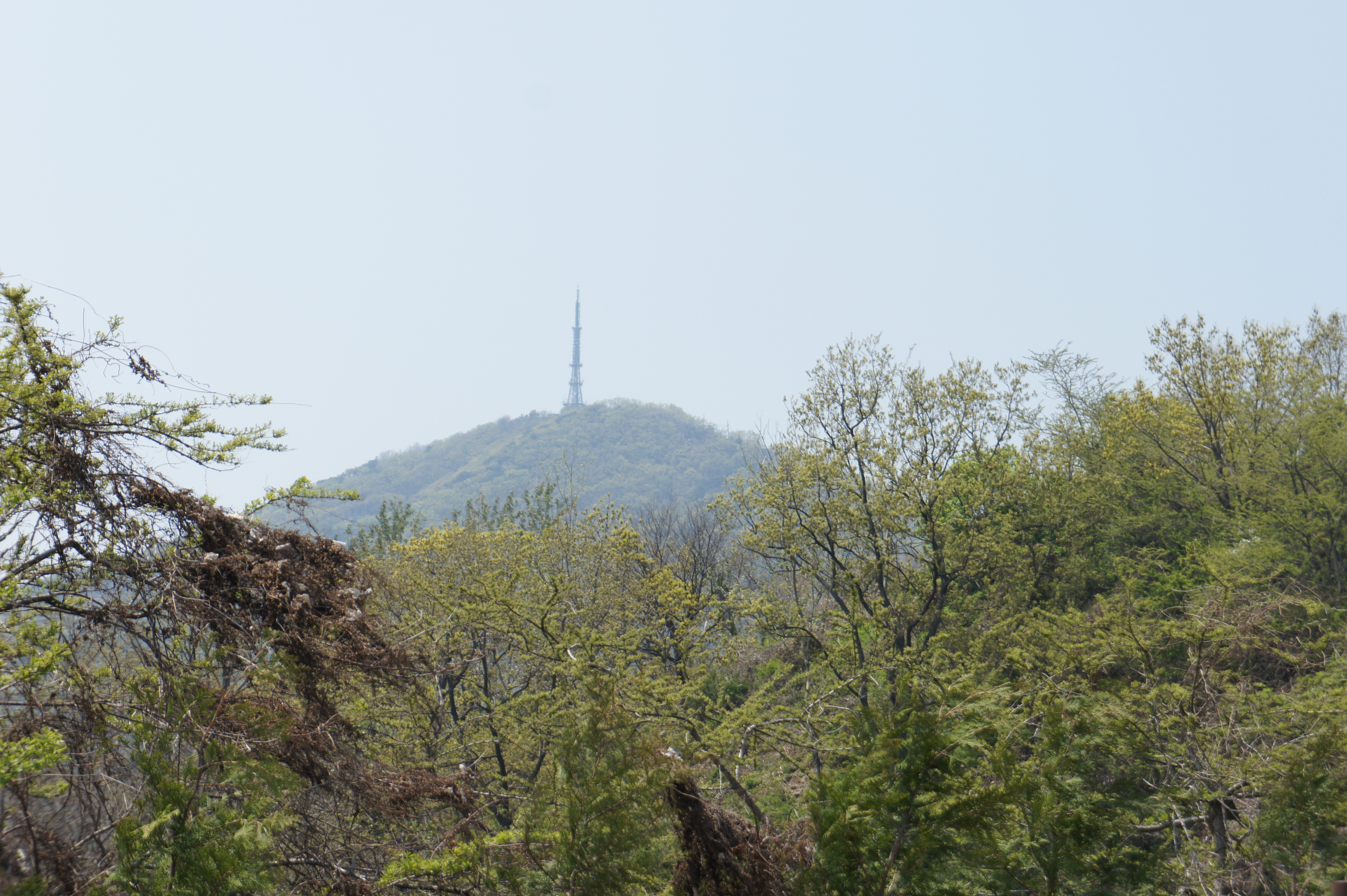
- Gyeyangsan Mountain, looking west from the trail leading to the summit

Highest point
- Elevation: 395 m (1,296 ft)
- Coordinates: 37°33′11″N 126°42′54″E

Geography
- Location: Incheon, South Korea

Korean name
- Hangul: 계양산
- Hanja: 桂陽山
- RR: Gyeyangsan
- MR: Kyeyangsan

Gyeyangsan (Korean: 계양산) is a mountain located in Incheon, South Korea. It has an elevation of 395 m (1,296 ft). Its elevation makes it the second highest in Incheon, next to Manisan (Incheon) which is located in Gwanghwa Island. From the top of the mountain, Gimpo Airport is visible, with a view of Seoul to the east, various islands such as Gwanghwa Island and Yeongjongdo in the west, Goyang in the north, and a whole view of Incheon to the south. It is considered a symbol representing Incheon.

== See also ==
- Geography of Korea
- List of mountains in Korea
- List of mountains by elevation
