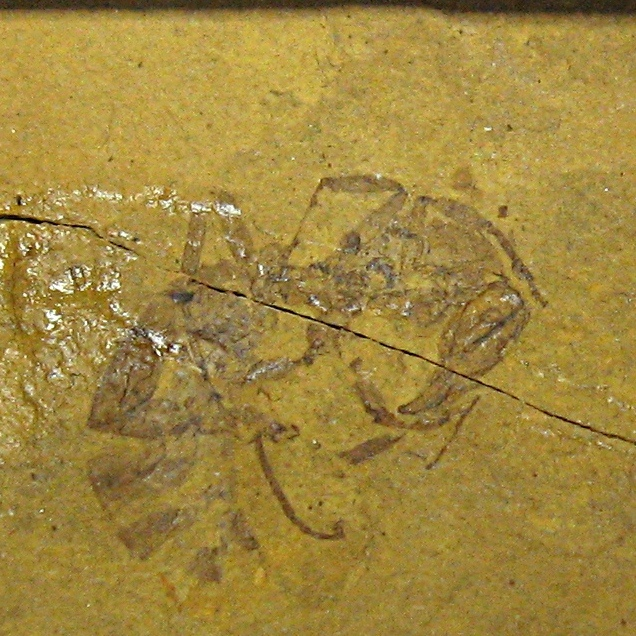
- Myrmeciites "incertae sedis" SR 05-03-01

Scientific classification
- Kingdom: Animalia
- Phylum: Arthropoda
- Clade: Pancrustacea
- Class: Insecta
- Order: Hymenoptera
- Family: Formicidae
- Subfamily: Myrmeciinae
- Tribe: incertae sedis
- Genus: †Myrmeciites; Archibald, Cover, & Moreau, 2006

Species
- see text

= Myrmeciites =

Myrmeciites Temporal range: Ypresian, 51 Ma

Extinct genus of ants

Myrmeciites is an extinct form genus of bulldog ants in the subfamily Myrmeciinae of the family Formicidae, which contains three described species and two fossils not placed beyond the genus level. Described in 2006 from Ypresian stage (Early Eocene) deposits, all three of the described species and one unplaced fossil are from British Columbia, Canada, while the second unplaced fossil is from Washington State, USA. These ants were large, with the largest specimens collected reaching 3 centimetres (1.2 in). The behaviour of these ants would have been similar to extant Myrmeciinae ants, such as solitary foraging, nesting either in the soil or trees, and leaving no pheromone trail to food sources. Due to the poor preservation of these ants, their phylogenetic position among Myrmeciinae is unclear, and no type species has been designated. These ants are classified as incertae sedis in Myrmeciinae, but some writers have classified it as incertae sedis within the insect order Hymenoptera. This reclassification, however, has not been accepted; instead, Myrmeciites remains in Myrmeciinae.

== History and classification ==
Fossils of Myrmeciites were first studied and described by Bruce Archibald, Stefan Cover and Corrie Moreau of the Museum of Comparative Zoology in Cambridge, Massachusetts. They published their 2006 description of the form genus (which is a collection of species formally described but cannot be identified to genus level) in an Annals of the Entomological Society of America journal article. The genus name is a combination of the ant subfamily name "Myrmeciinae" and the Latin suffix "ites", meaning "having the nature of", which is commonly used in the naming of fossil taxa. Its phylogenetic position within Myrmeciinae is unclear, due to the incomplete and poor preservation of the collected specimens. The paper that described the form genus included the description of three species, including Myrmeciites herculeanus, Myrmeciites(?) goliath, and Myrmeciites(?) tabanifluviensis.

Archibald and colleagues classified Myrmeciites as incertae sedis (Latin for "of uncertain placement") within the ant subfamily Myrmeciinae, as the specimens are too poorly preserved to be assigned to any tribe. However, in a 2008 paper, Cesare Baroni Urbani of the University of Basel, Switzerland, classified Myrmeciites as incertae sedis within the insect order Hymenoptera (which comprises the sawflies, wasps, bees and ants) because the critical characters used to identify Myrmeciinae ants, or even the family Formicidae cannot be carried out on Myrmeciites. Despite these comments, a 2012 report by Russian palaeoentomologist Gennady M. Dlussky does not make any comment in regard to Baroni Urbani's views; instead, he accepts the classification of Archibald and colleagues.

== Description ==
Archibald, Cover, and Moreau erected the form genus as an encompassing category for all fossil ants which, while belonging to the subfamily Myrmeciinae, lack details needed for placement in other described genera. This may be due to preservation quality or positioning of the individual ant resulting in obscured details. As Myrmeciites is a form genus it does not have a designated type species per the International Code of Zoological Nomenclature.

=== M. herculeanus ===
M. herculeanus was described from a single side of a compression fossil found at the Middle Ypresian McAbee Fossil Beds, Kamloops Group, near Cache Creek, British Columbia. The incomplete specimen numbered UCCIPR L-18 F-974, is currently preserved in the paleontology collections housed at the Thompson Rivers University, Kamloops, British Columbia. Archibald, Cover, and Moreau coined the specific epithet "herculeanus" from the Latin name "Hercules" in reference to the notably sturdy and large morphology of the type specimen, and after the divine hero Heracles in Greek mythology, who was the son of Zeus and Alcmene. The species is discernible from the other species of Myrmeciinae by its notably larger size, the worker caste ant is estimated at over 20 millimetres (0.79 in) in life. Its size is comparable to ants in the genus Ypresiomyrma. The shape of the petiole, a narrow waist that is located between the mesosoma and gaster is distinct from other species and is similar in structure to the genus Prionomyrmex though the shape and size of the mandibles are distinct. Overall, M. herculeanus was assigned to Myrmeciinae due to its mandible length, despite them being poorly preserved, and due to the appearance of its petiole and propodeum. The legs are long in comparison to its body length, and the gaster is robust. It is unknown if the species had a sting, due to the preservation of the specimen. The size of the single known worker is larger than any of the studied queens; as Myrmeciinae queens are slightly larger than the other castes in a species, this indicates M. herculeanus is most likely a distinct species. Due to the incomplete nature of the type specimen, the species was placed in Myrmeciites.

=== M.(?) goliath ===
The second species described from the McAbee Fossil Beds is M.(?) goliath and as with M. herculeanus, it is known from one specimen, though both the part and counterpart are known for M.(?) goliath. The holotype is housed in the Thompson Rivers University, Kamloops, collections as UCCIPR L-18 F-999 and UCCIPRL-18 F-1000 for each side respectively. The species name "goliath" was chosen by Archibald, Cover and Moreau in reference to the mythological Goliath, due to the notable size of the ant. The holotype specimen is a partial worker or queen which is incomplete, with a notable portion of the gaster missing. The species can be separated from other ants by the large size, the holotype approaching 3 centimetres (1.2 in). The only other Eocene ants in this size range are members of the genus Titanomyrma, that were formerly placed in Formicium. M.(?) goliath is distinguishable from Titanomyrma by the shape and structure of the antennae and length of the legs, which are notably shorter in Titanomyrma. The head is very round and flattened, compound eyes are present and the mandibles are small, less than half the length of the head. The head is also small in proportion to the mesosoma. The legs are large and long, and a poorly preserved petiole is known. Most of the specimen is preserved in fine detail, but some characters are so poorly preserved that the exact placement of M.(?) goliath within Myrmeciinae cannot be confirmed. Only future fossils that are better preserved can clarify the position of M.(?) goliath.

=== M.(?) tabanifluviensis ===
Unlike the other described Myrmeciites species, M.(?) tabanifluviensis is the only species not from the McAbee Fossil Beds. The holotype, currently deposited in the Courtenay and District Museum paleontology collections as 2003.2.10 CDM 034 was recovered from the "Horsefly shale", part of an unnamed formation, outcropping near the town of Horsefly, British Columbia. The specimen is incomplete with both the head and portions of the mesosoma and gaster missing. The adult had an estimated length in life of over 1.5 centimetres (0.59 in). The right portions of the legs are well preserved while the left legs are missing with two metatibia spurs, one of which is long and the other is short and narrow. Due to the incomplete nature of the specimen and position of the preserved portions, the gender is not identifiable, though the presence of wings indicates it to be a reproductive adult. The small size of the specimen, with a fore-wing length of approximately 12 millimetres (0.47 in), separates this species from other members of the British Columbia Myrmeciinae. The type locality for the species, near the Horsefly River, was the basis for Archibald, Cover and Moreau choosing the specific epithet tabanifluviensis, combined with the horsefly genus name Tabanus, the Latin word fluvius meaning "river" and the suffix -ensis meaning "origin" or "place". The justification of placing this ant in Myrmeciites is due to incomplete preservation.

=== Unplaced specimens ===
Two additional specimens were placed within the form genus but not into a specific species. The Courtenay and District Museum specimen 2003.2.9 CDM 03 a&b is a 2 centimetres (20 mm) long partial male recovered from the Falkland site, near Falkland, British Columbia. The generally robust nature of the specimen excludes it from the genus Avitomyrmex, but the details needed for placement between the genera Ypresiomyrma and Macabeemyrma are not present. The Stonerose Interpretive Center specimen "SR 05-03-01" is a possible queen or worker which would have been an estimated 1.5 centimetres (15 mm) long in life. Due to the lateral preservation of the specimen, most characters for placing the specimen into one of the defined species are obscured or absent. The specimen was recovered from outcrops of the Klondike Mountain Formation north west of Republic, Washington.

== Ecology ==
Archibald and colleagues suggested that the behavioural habits for Myrmeciites ants, like that of other extinct Myrmeciinae taxa, may have been similar to its extant relatives. Workers would forage onto trees or vegetation to capture arthropod prey or to feed on nectar, soiling either in the ground or in the trees, making them an arboreal nesting insect. Like other Myrmeciine ants, Myrmeciites most likely did not lay pheromone trails or recruit nestmates to food sources; these ants may have been solitary foragers, relying on their eyes to hunt for prey and for navigational purposes. The nuptial flight of M. (?) tabanifluviensis probably occurred during the late spring or summer, as in extant relatives.
