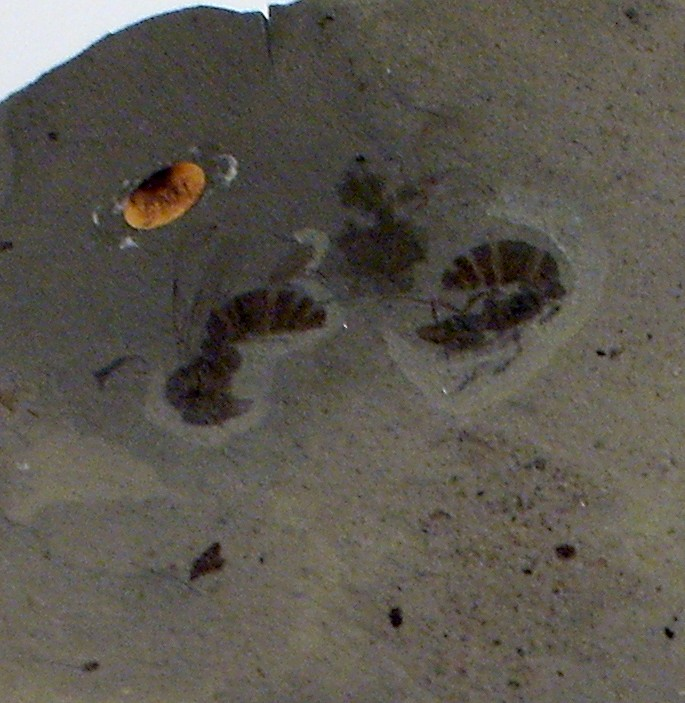
- Ypresiomyrma rebekkae fossils

Scientific classification
- Kingdom: Animalia
- Phylum: Arthropoda
- Clade: Pancrustacea
- Class: Insecta
- Order: Hymenoptera
- Family: Formicidae
- Subfamily: Myrmeciinae
- Tribe: incertae sedis
- Genus: †Ypresiomyrma; Archibald, Cover, & Moreau, 2006

Species
- Y. bartletti Archibald, Cover, & Moreau, 2006; Y. orbiculata Archibald, Cover, & Moreau, 2006; Y. orientalis Dlussky, Rasnitsyn, & Perfilieva, 2015; Y. rebekkae Rust & Andersen, 1999

= Ypresiomyrma =

Ypresiomyrma Temporal range: Ypresian -Late Eocene

Extinct genus of ants

Ypresiomyrma is an extinct genus of ants in the subfamily Myrmeciinae that was described in 2006. There are four species described; one species is from the Isle of Fur in Denmark, two are from the McAbee Fossil Beds in British Columbia, Canada, and the fourth from the Bol’shaya Svetlovodnaya fossil site in Russia. The queens of this genus are large, the mandibles are elongated and the eyes are well developed; a stinger is also present. The behaviour of these ants would have been similar to that of extant Myrmeciinae ants, such as solitary foraging for arthropod prey and never leaving pheromone trails. The alates were poor flyers due to their size, and birds and animals most likely preyed on these ants. Ypresiomyrma is not assigned to any tribe, and is instead generally regarded as incertae sedis within Myrmeciinae. However, some authors believe Ypresiomyrma should be assigned as incertae sedis within Formicidae.

== History and classification ==
Fossils of Ypresiomyrma were first studied and described by Bruce Archibald, Stefan Cover and Corrie Moreau of the Museum of Comparative Zoology in Cambridge, Massachusetts. They published their 2006 description of the genus and species in an Annals of the Entomological Society of America journal article. The genus name is a combination of Ypresian, referring to the age of the specimens and the Greek myrmex, meaning "ant". The minimum fossil age is approximately 54.5 to 55.5 million years.

Along with the genus description, the paper contained descriptions of the type species Ypresiomyrma orbiculata and Ypresiomyrma bartletti, both from the McAbee Fossil Beds Tranquille Formation in British Columbia, part of the Eocene Okanagan Highlands lake system. Archibald, Cover and Moreau also included a redescription of the Danish species Pachycondyla rebekkae under the new name combination Ypresiomyrma rebekkae. A fourth species, Ypresiomyrma orientalis was described in 2015.

Archibald and colleagues originally classified Ypresiomyrma as incertae sedis (Latin for "of uncertain placement") within the ant subfamily Myrmeciinae, as the ants could not be identified to any tribe level. However, a 2008 paper by Cesare Baroni Urbani of the University of Basel, Switzerland, expressed doubt that members of Ypresiomyrma were even ants. He notes that the development of the malar area (an area between the compound eyes and the mandibles) was different and not reduced, as a reduced malar is synapomorphic (key diagnostic traits) in Myrmeciinae. Baroni Urbani further notes that the antennae's shape on the type species could not be properly determined, making its true placement within Formicidae indeterminable. However, the antennae of Y. rebekkae has an elongated scape which means the fossil is definitely an ant, as this feature is a key diagnostic trait for Formicidae. Due to this, Baroni Urbani believed that Ypresiomyrma could only be confidently classified as incertae sedis within the family Formicidae. A subsequent report by Russian palaeoentomologist Gennady M. Dlussky describing new myrmecines accepted the classification of Archibald and colleagues without mentioning the comments of Baroni Urbani.

The following cladogram generated by Archibald and colleagues show the possible phylogenetic position of Ypresiomyrma among some ants of the subfamily Myrmeciinae. The genus may be closely related to other extinct Myrmeciinae genera, including Avitomyrmex and Macabeemyrma, and the extant Nothomyrmecia macrops.

- Myrmeciinae
  - Archimyrmex
  - Myrmecia
  - - - Prionomyrmex janzeni
      - Prionomyrmex longiceps
    - - Macabeemyrma
      - Avitomyrmex
      - Ypresiomyrma
      - Nothomyrmecia

== Description ==
There are several characteristics that separate Ypresiomyrma from other ant genera. The waist connecting the thorax and the abdomen in Ypresiomyrma is composed of a single segment. The head in each species varies in shape, and mandibles are a distinct triangular shape and shorter than the head capsule with eight to twelve teeth, although they are elongated. Queens of the genus are large, measuring over 20 millimetres (0.79 in). Other characters include large, well developed eyes, a rounded propodeal dorsum and a noticeable stinger.

=== Y. orbiculata ===
Artist's reconstruction of Y. orbiculata

Y. orbiculata was described from a single part and counterpart compression fossil found at the Middle Ypresian McAbee Fossil Beds, Kamloops Group, near Cache Creek, British Columbia. The type specimens numbered UCCIPR L-18 F-749 and UCCIPR L-18 F-750 for the part and counterpart is currently preserved in the palaeoentomology collections housed at Thompson Rivers University, in Kamloops, British Columbia. Archibald, Cover, and Moreau coined the specific epithet from the Latin "orbiculatus", meaning "rounded" or "circular", in reference to the shape of the head. The species is discernible from the other two species of Ypresiomyrma by its notably rounded head capsule, and by the shape of the petiole which has a smoothly sloping convex shape with a node in the center. The petiole is similar in appearance to Prionomyrmex janzeni, and the propodeum is round. The queen is estimated to have been approximately 25 millimetres (0.98 in). The compound eyes are large and oval shape, but the antennae cannot be described due to poor preservation. The mandibles are large, containing seven to eight teeth. A well-developed stinger is also present.

=== Y. bartletti ===
The second species described from the McAbee Fossil Beds is Y. bartletti which, like Y. orbiculata, is known from a single queen specimen. The holotype part and counterpart are included in the Geological Survey of Canada, Ottawa collections as GSC 127632a and GSC 127632b. The shape of the head is subtriangular, which separates it from Y. orbiculata, and at an estimated 20 millimetres (0.79 in) it is smaller than Y. rebekkae. The petiole shape in Y. bartletti is distinct from both other species. The specific epithet was chosen in honor of Rod Bartlett who collected the specimen, and to honor his work with the Vancouver Paleontological Society and the British Columbia Paleontological Alliance. The antennae are not preserved and the eyes cannot be distinguished. The mandibles have around ten or fewer teeth. The forewings of the queen are faintly preserved, and portions of the legs are preserved and disarticulated. Some portions of the gaster are deformed and the specimen appears to be crushed, but the overall morphology of this species justifies its placement within Myrmeciinae. An undescribed worker in the form genus Myrmeciites may possibly be a Y. bartletti ant, but this cannot be confirmed due to its poor preservation.

=== Y. rebekkae ===
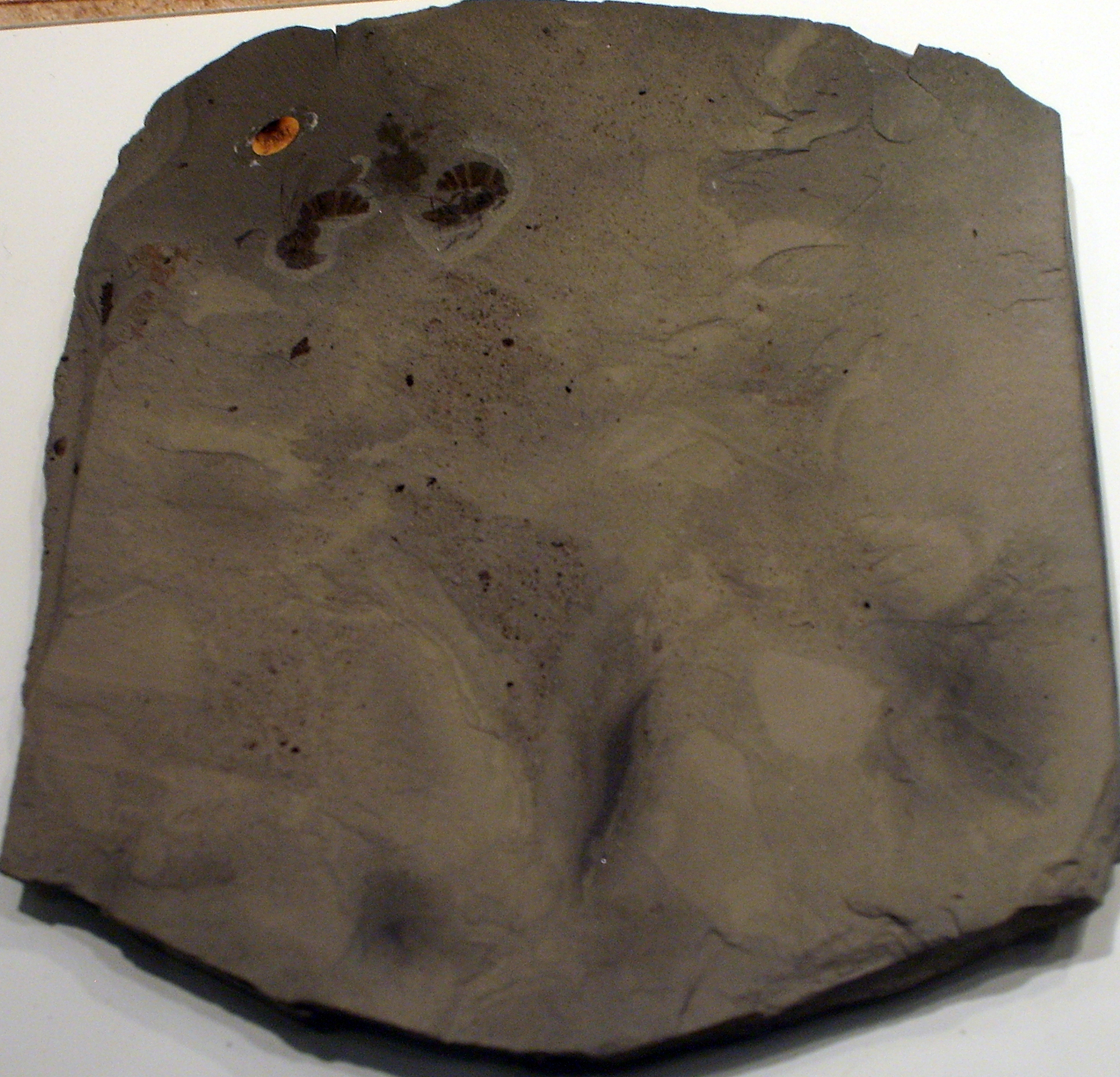
Complete Y. rebekkae holotype slab

This species is known from over 100 specimens collected from the earliest Ypresian Ølst and Fur Formations, found in calcareous rocks. The specimens were first studied and described by Jes Rust and N. Møller Andersen in 1999, and they named the species for Rebekka Madsen who collected the type specimen in September 1994. The holotype and paratype queen described are well preserved, although the legs are missing; the part and counterpart, GMUC No. 1995 8B and GMUC No. 1995 8A are deposited in the Geological Museum of the University of Copenhagen. At that time, Rust and Andersen placed the species into the modern ponerin genus Pachycondyla based on the shape of the abdominal segment VI and lack of dentition on the mandibles. Archibald, Cover, and Moreau moved the species to Ypresiomyrma based on the similarity to the McAbee species, by the shape of the abdominal segment III, which differs from that found in the Ponerinae subfamily genera, and by the morphology of the petiole. Y. rebekkae can be distinguished from other species by the shape of its petiole and the size of its head, being notably larger than Y. bartletti. The ants' somewhat angular head is also different, with other species having a rounded head. The species is known almost exclusively from queens, with only one known male ant assigned to it by Rust and Andersen.

The average length of a queen is around 25 millimetres (0.98 in), with a robust body. The head is round, and the width and length are the same, measuring 4.5 millimetres (0.18 in). The eyes are oval shaped and developed, located near the middle of the head. The mandibles are triangular and long, with ten teeth present. The antennae are long with 11 segments, and the scape is 3.4 millimetres (0.13 in) long. The mesosoma is 7 millimetres (0.28 in) long and 4.5 millimetres (0.18 in) wide. The mesosoma is convex and domed, and the pronotum is short. The petiole is 1.5 millimetres (0.059 in) long and 2.3 millimetres (0.091 in) in wide, and the gaster is swollen, but this is due to the early taphonomic process (the transition of a decaying organism over time and how it becomes fossilised). A well-developed stinger is present in the fossilized specimens.

Only a single complete male is known from all the collected specimens. The body length is shorter in comparison to the queen caste, measuring 25 millimetres (0.98 in) and it is also more slender. The head and mandibles are small, but the eyes are fully developed and large. The antennae are not preserved, and only small fragments of the legs are present. The gaster is smaller and more elongated, but the genitalia are not preserved.

=== Y. orientalis ===
Y. orientalis was described from a part and counterpart holotype and a solitary forewing paratype compression fossil found at the late Eocene Bol’shaya Svetlovodnaya fossil site, in the Sikhote-Alin area of far-eastern Russia. The type specimens numbered PIN 3429/1109 for the part and counterpart and PIN 3429/1198 are currently preserved in the A.A. Borissiak Paleontological Institute fossil collections of the Russian Academy of Sciences. Dlussky, Rasnitsyn, and Perfilieva coined the specific epithet from the Latin "orientalis", meaning "eastern", in reference to the type locality. The species is discernible from Y. rebekkae by its smaller petiole node size. While there are no distinct differences between Y. orientalis and the two Okanagan Highlands species Y. bartletti and Y. orbiculata, the fossils were placed into a new species by Dlussky, Rasnitsyn, and Perfilieva. This is due to the notable time difference between the highlands and Bol’shaya Svetlovodnaya. Though the possible gyne is incomplete the estimated body length is 17.5 mm (0.69 in) and the mesosoma is robust. The forewing has closed 1+2r, 3r, rm and mcu cells, with the 3r elongated while the 1+2r is shorted to just over twice as long as wide.

== Ecology ==
The life habits of Ypresiomyrma would have been similar to that of extant Myrmeciinae ants. Colonies nested in the soil or in trees, making them an arboreal nesting species. Workers were most likely solitary foragers, foraging on the ground or onto low vegetation and trees while preying on arthropods or consuming nectar. Workers most likely did not recruit or lead nestmates to food sources, nor did workers lay down pheromone trails. Ypresiomyrma ants most likely used their large eyes to find prey and for navigational purposes.

The abundance of Ypresiomyrma queens collected suggests that these ants mated in swarms, but the alates were poor flyers due to their large size. The morphology of the mandibles indicate they were specialised tools for excavating chambers in soil or wood during colony foundation; their large size and common occurrence in their geographical range would mean they were an important food source to a variety of birds and Paleogene animals that predominately fed on insects.
