= Macabeemyrma =

Macabeemyrma Temporal range: Ypresian, 51 Ma
- Reconstruction of Macabeemyrma ovata head capsule

Scientific classification
- Kingdom: Animalia
- Phylum: Arthropoda
- Clade: Pancrustacea
- Class: Insecta
- Order: Hymenoptera
- Family: Formicidae
- Subfamily: Myrmeciinae
- Genus: †Macabeemyrma
- Species: †M. ovata

Binomial name
- †Macabeemyrma ovata Archibald, Cover, & Moreau, 2006

Extinct genus of ants

Macabeemyrma is an extinct genus of bulldog ants in the subfamily Myrmeciinae containing the single species Macabeemyrma ovata, described in 2006 from Ypresian stage (Early Eocene) deposits of British Columbia, Canada. Only a single specimen is known; a holotype queen found preserved as a compression fossil. The specimen had no wings and small portions of its legs and eyes were faintly preserved. It was a large ant, reaching 25 millimetres (0.98 in) in length. This ants' behaviour would have been similar to that of extant Myrmeciinae ants, such as foraging singly in search for arthropod prey and nesting in soil or in trees. Macabeemyrma shows similarities to extinct ants in the genus Ypresiomyrma, and to the living Nothomyrmecia macrops, but has not been conclusively assigned to any tribe, instead generally regarded as incertae sedis within Myrmeciinae. However, the sole specimen lacks definitive traits, and its classification in Myrmeciinae, and even its identity as an ant, has been challenged.

== History and classification ==
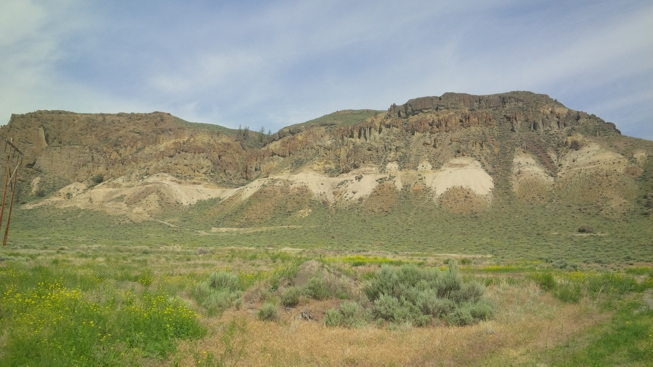
McAbee Fossil Beds, British Columbia. Type locality of Macabeemyrma

Macabeemyrma ovata is known only from a single fossil specimen: a mostly complete adult queen, preserved as a compression fossil in fine-grained shale. The shale is from fossiliferous outcrops at the McAbee Fossil Beds, part of an unnamed bed in the Kamloops group Tranquille Formation which outcrops near Cache Creek in British Columbia, Canada. The holotype specimen was collected by an unknown person and donated to Thompson Rivers University in 2002. The specimen was described by Bruce Archibald, Stefan Cover and Corrie Moreau of Harvard University's Museum of Comparative Zoology, with their 2006 type description of the genus and species. The generic name Macabeemyrma is a toponym of the type locality at McAbee (Note: In accordance with the International Code of Zoological Nomenclature recommendations, the locality name was spelled Macabee.) combined with the Greek myrmex, meaning "ant". The specific epithet ovata, from the Latin "ovatus" meaning "egg shaped", refers to the shape of the head capsule.

Archibald and colleagues originally classified Macabeemyrma as incertae sedis (Latin for "of uncertain placement") within the ant subfamily Myrmeciinae, as it could not be confidently placed into any ant tribe. However, in a 2008 paper, Cesare Baroni Urbani of the University of Basel, Switzerland, noted that the specimen shares some traits found in other ant subfamilies and some wasps, and lacks key diagnostic traits (synapomorphies) of the ant family, Formicidae, and thus argued Macabeemyrma could only be confidently classified as incertae sedis within the order Hymenoptera. A subsequent report describing new fossil myrmecines accepted the classification of Archibald and colleagues, although noting that its placement in the subfamily raises some doubts.

The following cladograms generated by Archibald and colleagues show two possible phylogenetic positions of Macabeemyrma among some ants of the subfamily Myrmeciinae; the cladogram on the right included three additional extinct genera compared to that on the left. They suggest that Macabeemyrma ovata and other extinct ants such as Avitomyrmex and Ypresiomyrma may be closely related to the living Nothomyrmecia macrops.

- Myrmeciinae
  - Myrmecia
  - - - Prionomyrmex janzeni
      - Prionomyrmex longiceps
    - - Macabeemyrma
      - Nothomyrmecia

- Myrmeciinae
  - Archimyrmex
  - Myrmecia
  - - - Prionomyrmex janzeni
      - Prionomyrmex longiceps
    - - Macabeemyrma
      - Avitomyrmex
      - Ypresiomyrma
      - Nothomyrmecia

== Description ==
The overall body of the ant is poorly preserved and much of it is indistinct. Macabeemyrma ovata is about 25 millimetres (0.98 in) long with a distinct elongated oval head capsule that is about 1.5x longer than wide. The holotype is missing the wings and some portions of the legs while the eyes are very faintly preserved. It could not be confirmed whether its eyes were compound or not, but if it was to be confirmed they would share similar eye characteristics to Myrmecia. The exact shape of the mandibles cannot be properly determined, but they are elongated and not subtriangular which is normal for other members of Myrmeciinae except the genus Myrmecia. Its elongated head and mandibles distinguish this species from those in the genus Ypresiomyrma, which are otherwise thought to have a close phylogenetic relationship due to similarities. The waist consists of a single segment, and whether or not the ant has a sting cannot be fully determined due to the condition of the specimen collected.

== Ecology ==
Archibald and colleagues suggested the life habits of Macabeemyrma ovata may have been similar to extant Myrmeciinae ants. The ant is large with long legs and elongated mandibles. It presumably had large eyes that were used to hunt for prey and navigation, and the ant was possibly equipped with a sting. Colonies most likely nested in the soil like most other Myrmeciinae, but like some Myrmecia species it is possible they were an arboreal nesting species. Workers were solitary foragers, foraging on the ground or onto vegetation while preying on arthropods. Workers most likely did not recruit other ants to food sources or lay down pheromone trails.
