= Scent trail =

Scent trail may refer to

- trail pheromones laid down to guide navigation by ants etc.
- a scent trail used in tracking (hunting) or by a tracking dog
