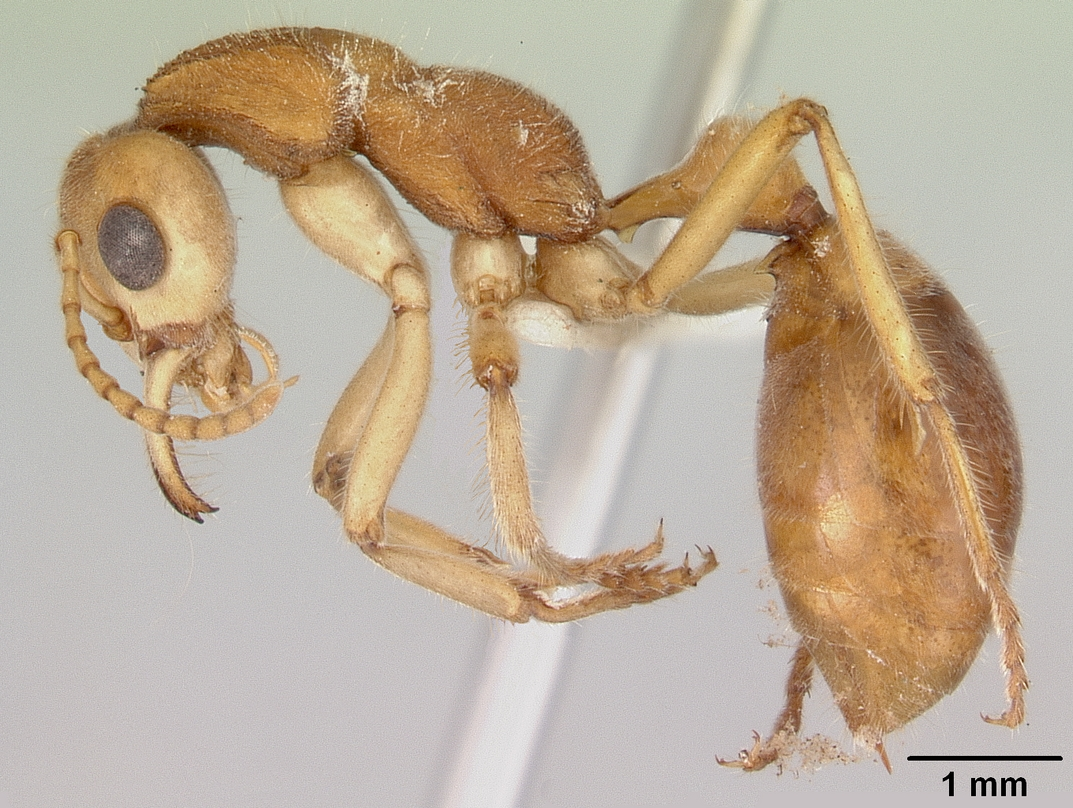
- Nothomyrmecia macrops

Scientific classification
- Kingdom: Animalia
- Phylum: Arthropoda
- Class: Insecta
- Order: Hymenoptera
- Family: Formicidae
- Subfamily: Myrmeciinae
- Tribe: Prionomyrmecini; Wheeler, 1915

Genera
- Nothomyrmecia Clark, 1934; Prionomyrmex Mayr, 1868

Synonyms
- Nothomyrmecii Clark, 1934

= Prionomyrmecini =

Tribe of ants

Prionomyrmecini is an ant tribe belonging to the subfamily Myrmeciinae established by William Morton Wheeler in 1915. Two members are a part of this tribe, the extant Nothomyrmecia and the extinct Prionomyrmex. The tribe was once considered a subfamily due to the similarities between Nothomyrmecia and Prionomyrmex, but such reclassification was not widely accepted by the scientific community. These ants can be identified by their long slender bodies, powerful stingers and elongated mandibles. Fossil Prionomyrmecini ants were once found throughout Europe, possibly nesting in trees and preferring jungle habitats. Today, Prionomyrmecini is only found in Australia, preferring old-growth mallee woodland surrounded by Eucalyptus trees. Nothomyrmecia workers feed on nectar and arthropods, using their compound eyes for prey and navigational purposes. Owing to their primitive nature, they do not recruit others to food sources or create pheromone trails. Nothomyrmecia colonies are small, consisting of 50 to 100 individuals.

== Taxonomy ==
Prionomyrmecini was originally described in 1915 by American entomologist William Morton Wheeler in his journal article "The ants of the Baltic amber", who originally placed it in the subfamily Ponerinae. In the same journal, Wheeler assigned Prionomyrmex as the sole member of the tribe. In 1954, William Brown Jr. moved the tribe to Myrmeciinae, noting similar morphological characteristics of Prionomyrmex and other genera such as Myrmecia and Nothomyrmecia. In 2000, Cesare Baroni Urbani described a new fossil species from Baltic amber, which he named Prionomyrmex janzeni. After examining specimens of his newly described species and Nothomyrmecia, Baroni Urbani noted that Prionomyrmex is a paraphyletic relative to Nothomyrmecia, and the two genera were so morphologically similar that Nothomyrmecia must be synonymised. Due to this, Baroni Urbani separated Prionomyrmex from Myrmeciinae and synonymised Nothomyrmecia, renaming Nothomyrmecia macrops as Prionomyrmex macrops. The tribe itself was later treated as a subfamily, known as Prionomyrmeciinae. In 2003, Dlussky & Perfilieva separated Nothomyrmecia from Prionomyrmex and both genera were moved to the subfamily Myrmeciinae, and Prionomyrmecini was treated as a tribe. In 2005 and 2008, Baroni Urbani provided additional evidence in favour of his proposed classification, but such proposal has been rejected by the entomological community. Nothomyrmecia macrops and the extinct Prionomyrmex are the only accepted members of the tribe.

== Description and distribution ==
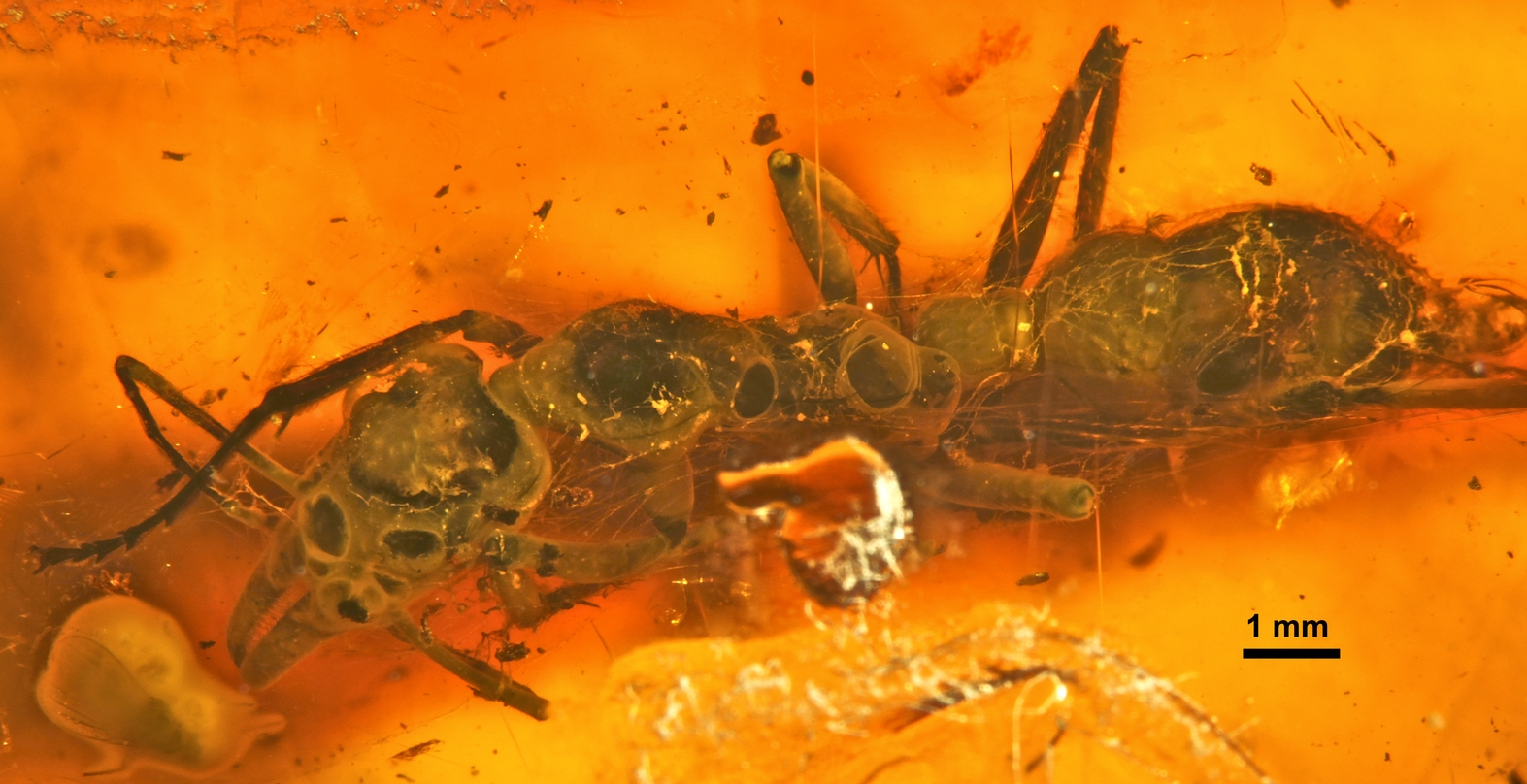
Prionomyrmex longiceps from Europe

Members of Prionomyrmecini can be distinguished from other members by the reduced or lacking ocelli, and a lateral clypeal carina is present. Prionomyrmex ants are characterised by their large size, slender bodies, elongated mandibles and powerful stingers. Lengths vary from 12 to 14 millimetres (0.47 to 0.55 in). Overall, the body structure of Prionomyrmex shows that it is more primitive than Myrmecia. Nothomyrmecia is smaller than Prionomyrmex species, measuring 9.7–11 mm (0.38–0.43 in). The ant has a long stinger, the body is slender and, like Prionomyrmex, has elongated mandibles. The mandibles, however, are less specialised than Myrmecia and Prionomyrmex, elongated and triangular. While Nothomyrmecia and Prionomyrmex are strikingly similar to each other, they can be distinguished from the shape of the node.

Fossil Prionomyrmecini ants existed in Europe during the Eocene and Late Oligocene. Cesare Baroni Urbani collected Prionomyrmex janzeni in Baltic amber from Kaliningrad, Russia and Prionomyrmex wappleri in Germany. Austrian entomologist Gustav Mayr collected Prionomyrmex longiceps in Baltic amber from the Eocene, but the exact location of its discovery is unclear, due to the lost type material. P. longiceps were an arboreal nesting species, living in trees instead of the ground. William Morton Wheeler assumed this due to its long legs, sharp claws and elongated mandibles. Prionomyrmex may have preferred a jungle habitat at low elevations.

Nothomyrmecia is only found in Australia. Until its rediscovery, the genus was only known from the original specimens collected in Western Australia by Amy Crocker in December 1931. Entomologist Robert W. Taylor expressed doubt about the type locality of the ant, but said that the specimens were probably collected from the western end of the Great Australian Bight, south from Balladonia. Entomologists feared that Nothomyrmecia was extinct, as notable biologists such as E.O. Wilson made attempts to find the ant but failed to do so. In 1977, Taylor rediscovered Nothomyrmecia in Poochera, 1300 km (800 mi) away from the original collection site. Colonies are found in old growth mallee woodland with many Eucalyptus species such as Eucalyptus brachycalyx, Eucalyptus oleosa and Eucalyptus gracilis abundant. Only a few small colonies are known in its restricted distribution, listing it as Critically Endangered by the International Union for Conservation of Nature.

== Behaviour and ecology ==
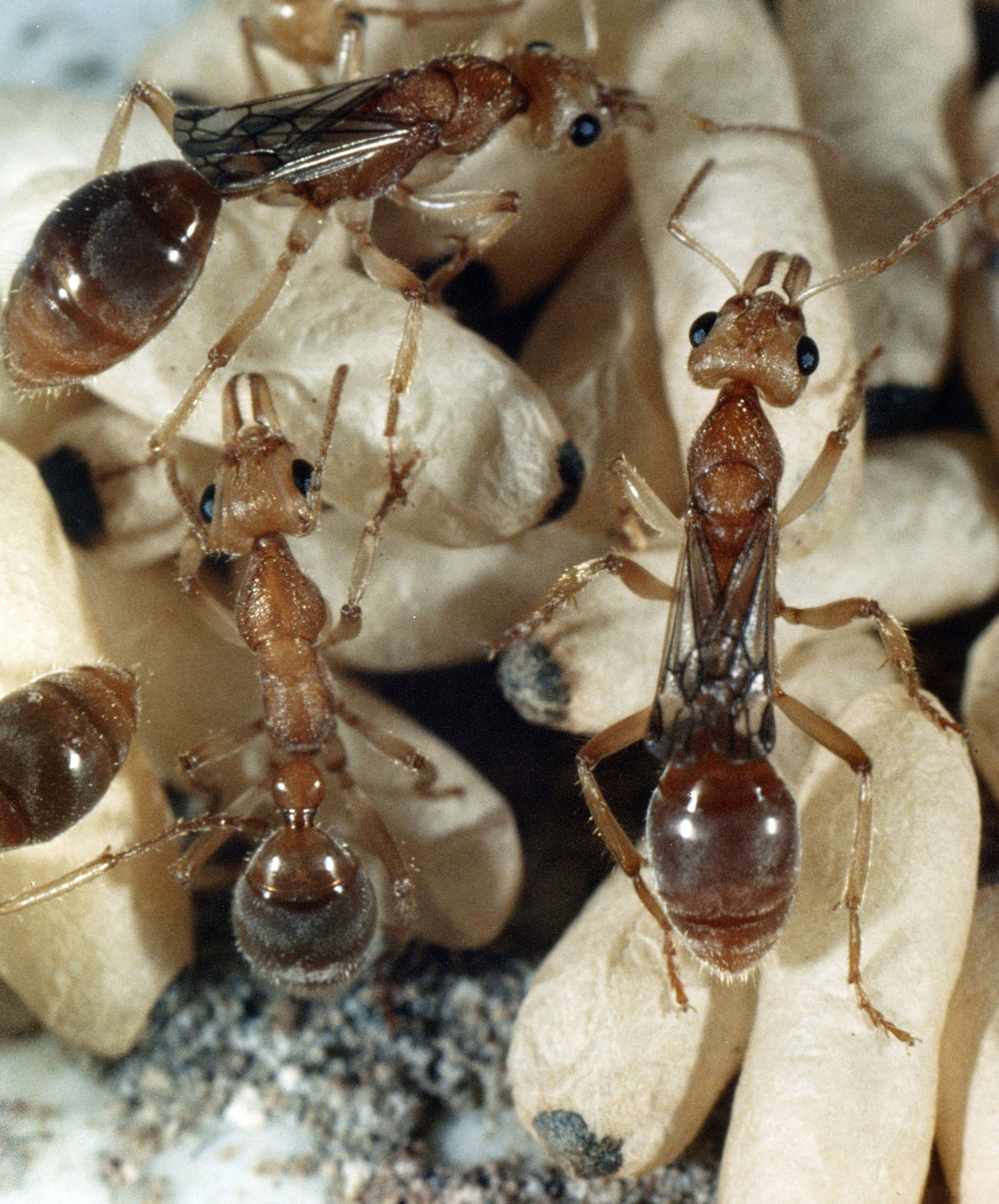
Nothomyrmecia queens with stubby wings, as well as pupae and a worker (left)

Nothomyrmecia and Prionomyrmex share similar behaviours with other Myrmeciinae relatives. Prionomyrmex may have foraged on the ground or onto trees and low vegetation, feeding on nectar and arthropods. Nothomyrmecia workers, however, drink hemolymph from the insects they capture, and the larvae are carnivorous. It is not known if the ants were active during the day or night, but Nothomyrmecia is a nocturnal ground forager that prefers very cold nights. Both ants have large compound eyes, relying on their vision for prey and navigational purposes. Due to their primitive and simplified social life, workers of both genera do not recruit others to food sources or leave down trail pheromones, suggesting that both these ants are solitary foragers. Prionomyrmex ants were hosts to female stylopid parasites. Predators are unknown for both ants.

Nothomyrmecia queens are brachypterous, meaning that they have stubby rudimentary wings that render them flightless. This may correlate with population structure, possibly as an adaptation in small populated colonies or by unusual ecological requirements. The alates may begin to emerge in late summer and early autumn (March or April), and colony-founding queens excavate to considerable depths underground; queens start to lay eggs by spring. Queens are univoltine and only produce a single generation of ants annually, and eggs may take 12 months to fully develop. When a colony is mature, only 50 to 100 individuals are present in each nest. In some colonies, colony founding can occur within a colony itself when a queen dies, taken over by one of her daughters. This method of colony founding may render a nest immortal.
