= Avitomyrmex =

Avitomyrmex Temporal range: Ypresian, 51 Ma

Scientific classification
- Kingdom: Animalia
- Phylum: Arthropoda
- Clade: Pancrustacea
- Class: Insecta
- Order: Hymenoptera
- Family: Formicidae
- Subfamily: Myrmeciinae
- Tribe: incertae sedis
- Genus: †Avitomyrmex; Archibald, Cover, & Moreau, 2006

Species
- A. elongatus Archibald, Cover, & Moreau, 2006; A. mastax Archibald, Cover, & Moreau, 2006; A. systenus Archibald, Cover, & Moreau, 2006

Extinct genus of ants

Avitomyrmex is an extinct genus of bulldog ants in the subfamily Myrmeciinae which contains three described species. The genus was described in 2006 from Ypresian stage (Early Eocene) deposits of British Columbia, Canada. Almost all the specimens collected are queens, with an exception of a single fossilised worker. These ants are large, and the eyes are also large and well-developed; a sting is present in one species. The behaviour of these ants may have been similar to extant Myrmeciinae ants, such as foraging solitarily for arthropod prey and never leaving pheromone trails to food sources. Avitomyrmex has not been assigned to any tribe, instead generally being regarded as incertae sedis within Myrmeciinae. However, its identity as an ant has been challenged, although it is undoubtedly a hymenopteran insect.

== History and classification ==
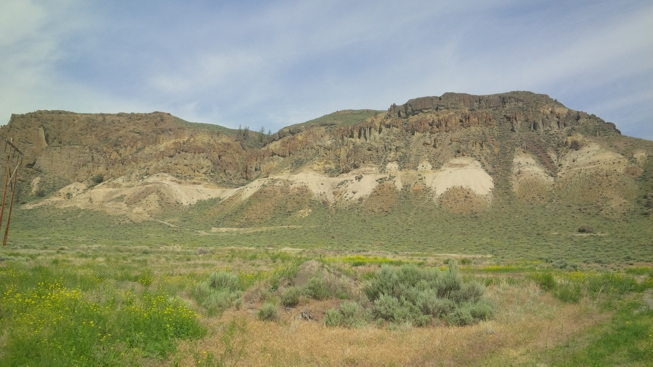
All Avitomyrmex specimens were collected from the McAbee Fossil Beds, British Columbia

Avitomyrmex is an extinct genus of ants with three described species. Fossils of Avitomyrmex, along with other extinct Myrmeciinae ants were first studied and described by Bruce Archibald, Stefan Cover and Corrie Moreau of the Museum of Comparative Zoology in Cambridge, Massachusetts. They published their 2006 description of the genus and species in an Annals of the Entomological Society of America journal article. The genus name is a combination of the Latin "avitus" meaning "ancient" or "grandfatherly" and the Greek myrmex, meaning "ant".

Included with the genus description, the paper contained the description of Avitomyrmex mastax, Avitomyrmex systenus, and the type species Avitomyrmex elongatus. These fossil species date back to the Middle Ypresian.

Archibald and colleagues originally classified Avitomyrmex as incertae sedis (Latin for "of uncertain placement") within the ant subfamily Myrmeciinae, as the specimens are unable to be properly identified. In 2008, however, Cesare Baroni Urbani of the University of Basel, Switzerland, noted that no specimen in this genus allows a proper examination of the apomorphy (key diagnostic traits) of the subfamilial or familial characters. While Baroni Urbani excludes Avitomyrmex from Myrmeciinae and classifies it as incertae sedis in Hymenoptera, the morphological characters and wings show the specimens are undoubtedly a hymenopteran insect. A 2012 report by Russian palaeoentomologist Gennady M. Dlussky of the Moscow State University describing new Myrmeciinae accepted the classification of Archibald and colleagues without mentioning the comments of Baroni Urbani.

The following cladograms generated by Archibald and colleagues show two possible phylogenetic positions of Avitomyrmex among some ants of the subfamily Myrmeciinae; the cladogram on the right included three additional extinct genera compared to that on the left. It is suggested that Avitomyrmex may be closely related to other extinct Myrmeciinae ants such as Macabeemyrma and Ypresiomyrma, as well as the extant Nothomyrmecia macrops.

- Myrmeciinae
  - Myrmecia
  - - - Nothomyrmecia
      - Avitomyrmex
    - - Prionomyrmex longiceps
      - Prionomyrmex janzeni

- Myrmeciinae
  - Archimyrmex
  - Myrmecia
  - - - Prionomyrmex janzeni
      - Prionomyrmex longiceps
    - - Macabeemyrma
      - Avitomyrmex
      - Ypresiomyrma
      - Nothomyrmecia

== Description ==
There are several characters which separate Avitomyrmex from other ant genera. The most notable feature is the distinctly slender nature of the queens and workers morphology. This is shown clearly in the shape of the petiole connecting the thorax and the abdomen. While similar to the modern myrmeciine genus Nothomyrmecia of Southern Australia, the two genera are distinguishable by the structure of the petiole, with Avitomyrmex lacking the peduncle seen in Nothomyrmecia. The eyes are large and well developed, the mandibles are subtriangular but poorly preserved, and a sting is present on examined A. systenus fossils. As for A. elongatus and A. mastax, it is unknown if the two ants have a sting, due to either poor preservation or the sting has not been preserved at all.

=== A. elongatus ===
A. elongatus was described from a single side of a compression fossil found from the Middle Ypresian McAbee Fossil Beds, Tranquille Formation, near Cache Creek, British Columbia. The incomplete specimen of a queen, numbered 2003.2.8CDM032, is currently preserved in the paleontology collections housed at the Courtenay and District Museum, Courtenay, British Columbia. Archibald, Cover, and Moreau coined the specific epithet from the Latin "elongatus" meaning "prolonged" in reference to the elongated morphology of the type specimen. The species is discernible from the other two species of Avitomyrmex by its notably larger size, the preserved portion of the ant being over 20 millimetres (0.8 inches). The forewings are almost as large as the specimen, measuring around 18 millimetres (0.7 inches) while the hindwings are too poorly preserved to be studied. The holotype is preserved with a partly disarticulated gaster and is missing her head.

=== A. mastax ===
The second species described from the McAbee Fossil Beds is A. mastax which, unlike A. elongatus, is known from two specimens. The holotype and paratype are both included in the Thompson Rivers University, Kamloops collections as UCCIPRL-18 F-850 and UCCIPRL-18 F-929 respectively. The holotype specimen is a partial queen which is incomplete, with one forewing and the head fairly preserved, and the other isolated body portions indistinct. The paratype is a mostly complete queen missing parts of her gaster, legs and hind wings. Overall the species is estimated to have been 15 millimetres (0.6 inches) long and has a forewing length of 13 millimetres (0.5 inches). A. mastax is distinguishable from the other species in Avitomyrmex by its smaller mandible size, being less than half the length of the head with eight teeth, and additionally the shape of the head capsule. The specimen also has large compound eyes. The specific epithet mastax is from the Greek "mastax" meaning "jaw" or "mandible", a reference to the small size of the mandibles compared to the other species of Avitomyrmex.

=== A. systenus ===
Of the three described species of Avitomyrmex found at the McAbee Fossil Beds, only A. systenus is known from worker caste specimens. The holotype is currently deposited in the Courtenay and District Museum paleontology collections as 2003.2.11 CDM 035 while the paratype, UCCIPR L-18 F-989, and an additional hypotype worker, UCCIPR L-18 F-825, which is tentatively assigned to the species are both deposited in Thompson Rivers University collections. Based on the mostly complete workers, mature specimens are estimated to have been 15 millimetres (0.6 inches). Due to the size of adult workers they cannot be attributed to A. elongatus while the overall petiole, head capsule and mandible structure distinguish it from A. mastax. The eyes are large and one-third the length of the head, and the legs are indistinctly preserved but long. The pronotum is almost flat, and the gaster is narrow. The shape of the head was the basis for Archibald, Cover and Moreau choosing the specific epithet systenus, which is from the Greek word systenos meaning "tapering to a point".

== Ecology ==
Archibald and colleagues suggested that the life habits of Avitomyrmex species may have been similar to that of extant Myrmeciinae ants. These ants may have nested in the soil or in trees, possibly being an arboreal nesting genus. This may be the case as one Myrmecia species is known to inhabit trees exclusively. Workers most likely preyed on arthropods, killing them with their sting and fed on nectar; workers would have been found foraging onto trees or low vegetation without leaving any pheromone trails to food sources or recruit nestmates, as they were solitary foragers. Avitomyrmex ants most likely used their large eyes to locate prey and for navigational purposes.
