= McAbee Fossil Beds =

Fossil bed in the Interior of British Columbia

Coordinates: 50°47.831′N 121°8.469′W

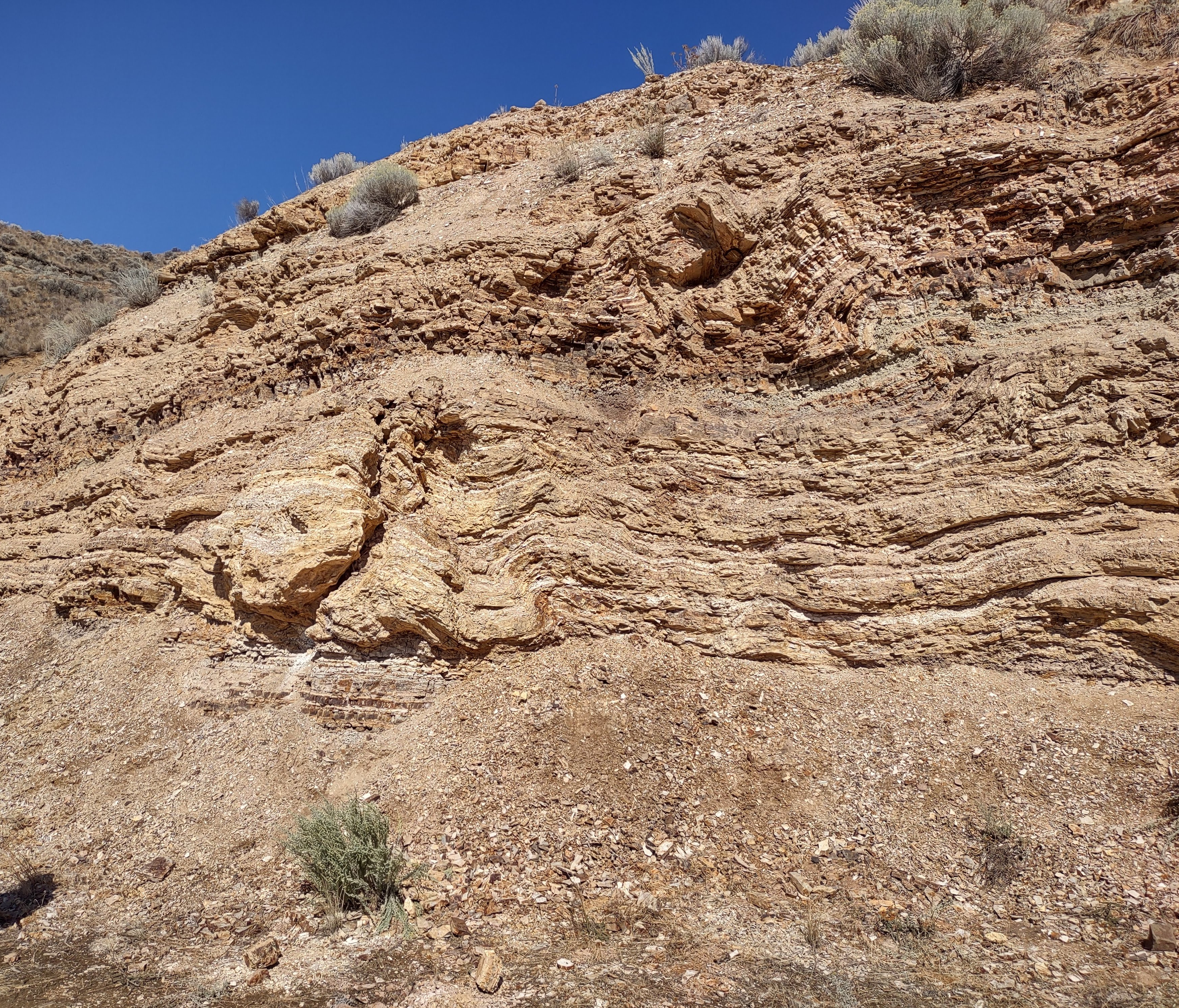
Former kitty litter quarry; pictured face is about 5 metres (16 ft) tall

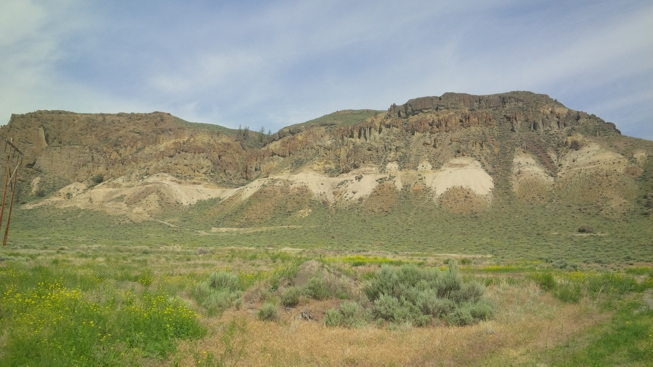
McAbee Fossil Beds viewed from the Highway.

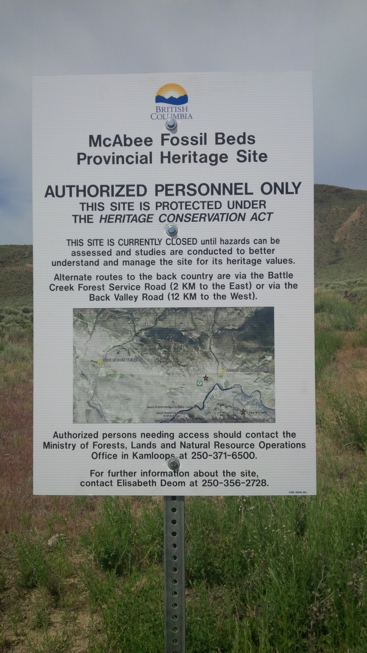
Heritage status sign

The McAbee Fossil Beds is a Heritage Site that protects an Eocene Epoch fossil locality east of Cache Creek, British Columbia, Canada, just north of and visible from Provincial Highway 97 / the Trans-Canada Highway (Highway 1). The McAbee Fossil Beds, comprising 548.23 hectares (1,354.7 acres), were officially designated a Provincial Heritage Site under British Columbia's Heritage Conservation Act on July 19, 2012. The site is part of an old lake bed which was deposited about 52 million years ago and is internationally recognised for the diversity of plant, insect, and fish fossils found there. Similar fossil beds in Eocene lake sediments, also known for their well preserved plant, insect and fish fossils, are found at Driftwood Canyon Provincial Park near Smithers in northern British Columbia, on the Horsefly River near Quesnel in central British Columbia, and at Republic in Washington, United States. The Princeton Chert fossil beds in southern British Columbia are also Eocene, but primarily preserve an aquatic plant community. A 2016 review of the early Eocene fossil sites from the interior of British Columbia discusses the history of paleobotanical research at McAbee, the Princeton Chert, Driftwood Canyon, and related Eocene fossil sites such as at Republic.

The McAbee site is now under the management of the Bonaparte First Nation, who have title on the lands. The site is currently closed to the public while interpretive components are installed.

== Palaeontology and geology ==
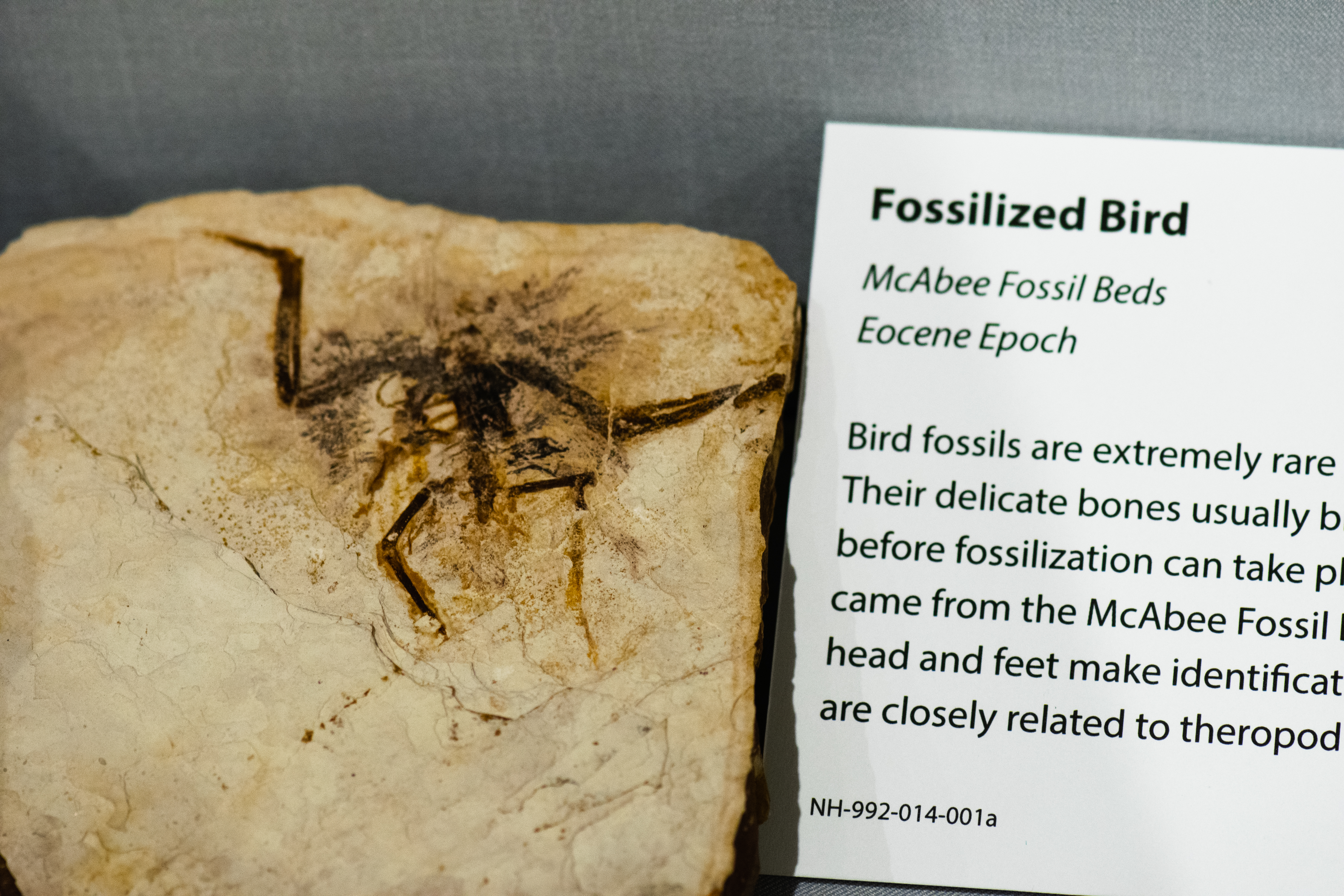
Indeterminate bird skeleton

Fossil plants from the same area as the McAbee fossil beds (Cache Creek and Kamloops B.C.) were first reported by G.M. Dawson. Palaeontological and geological studies of the McAbee Fossil Beds first commenced in the 1960s and early 1970s by Len Hills of the University of Calgary and his students on the fossil palynology (spores and pollen) and leaf fossils, and research on the fossil fish from the fossil beds by Mark Wilson of the University of Alberta. Thomas Ewing provided a detailed analysis of the geology of the Kamloops Group, including the McAbee beds. More recently, Lowe et al. have assessed in detail the site lithostratigraphy. Significant research on the fossil plants and insects has only occurred since the late 1980s. The McAbee Fossil Beds are best known for the abundant and well-preserved insect and fish fossils (Amyzon, Eohiodon, and Eosalmo). Eohiodon rosei from the McAbee Fossil Beds and other Eocene sites in British Columbia is now considered to belong to the present-day mooneye genus Hiodon.

The climate of the McAbee Eocene lake was reconstructed to be temperate and wet, with a mean annual temperature about 11 °C (52 °F), winters lacking frost (coldest month mean temperature ~5 °C), and annual precipitation over 1,000 mm (39 in) a year with little or no seasonality of precipitation. The extraordinary detail preserved in the insect fossils, as well as the high diversity of insects, plants and other organisms means the McAbee Fossil Beds represent a Konservat-Lagerstätten.

A volcanic ash exposed in the lake shale beds was originally radiometrically dated using the K-Ar method at ~51 million years ago; however, a 2005 paper provided a radiometric date using the ^{40}Ar-^{39}Ar method places the McAbee Fossil Beds at 52.9 ± 0.83 million years ago, with both dates placing the McAbee fossil beds in the early Eocene Epoch.

=== Flora ===
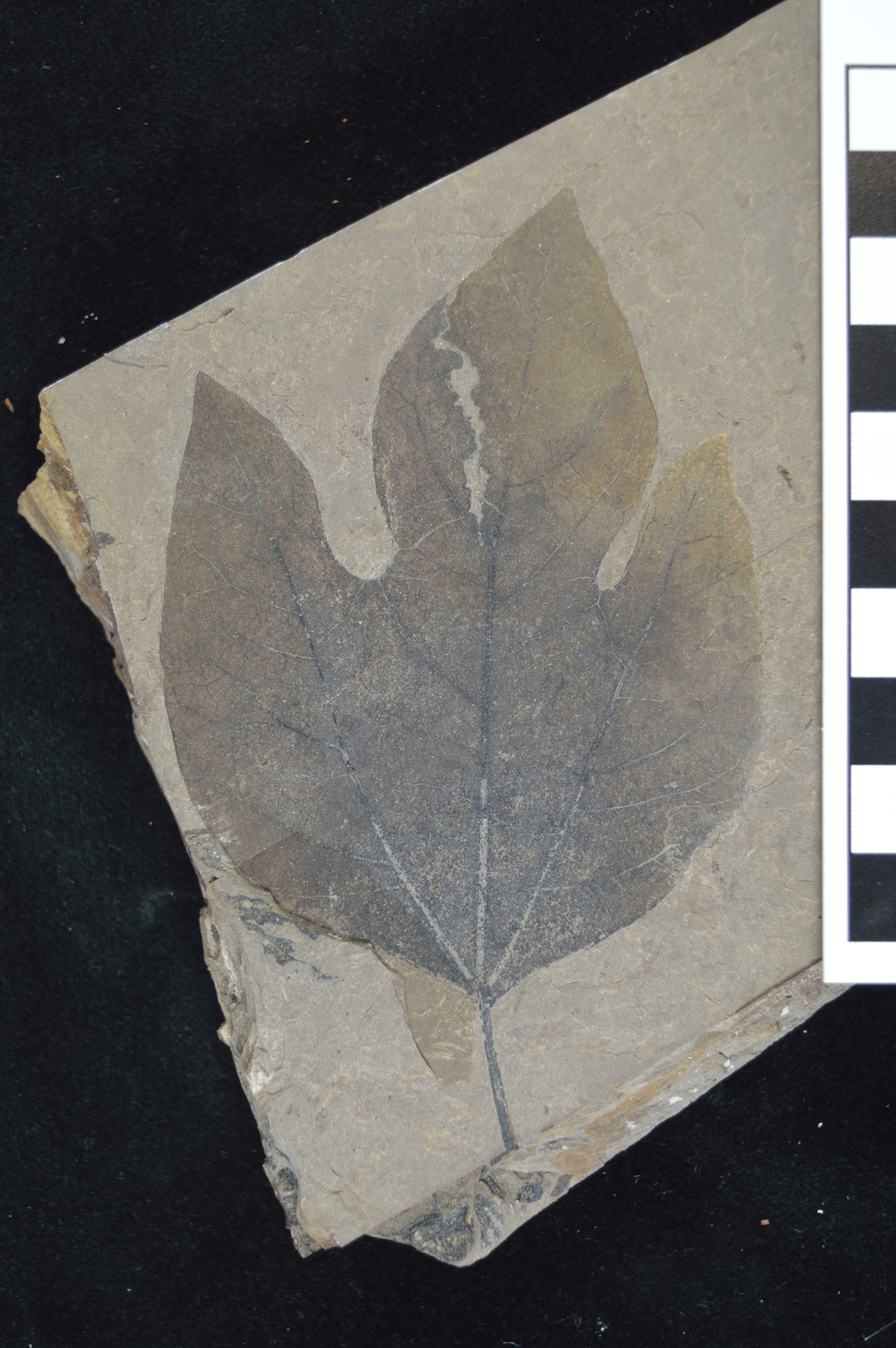
Fossil leaf of Sassafras hesperia from the McAbee Fossil Beds. Royal Tyrrell Museum of Palaeontology collection. Collected by L. Hills in 1983.

Fossils of plant leaves, shoots, seeds, flowers and cones are abundant and well preserved, and include up to 76 genera of plants. Fossil plants described from the fossil beds include rare fruits such as Dipteronia brownii, a genus of trees now endemic to China, extinct members of the birch family (Betulaceae) such as Palaeocarpinus, maples (Acer rousei), fruits and leaves of the beech Fagus langevinii and the elm Ulmus okanaganensis.

Below is an incomplete list of the plant genera found in the McAbee fossil beds based on the list found in Dillhoff, Leopold & Manchester (2005) and Wilson (2009) with extinct taxa denoted with a †.

plant family	genus or species	notes
Equisetaceae	Equisetum	Scouring rushes
Cupressaceae	Chamaecyparis, Cunninghamia, Metasequoia, Sequoia, Thuja	cypress, Chinese fir, dawn redwood, California redwood, red or white cedar
Ginkgoaceae	Ginkgo biloba	ginkgo, maidenhair tree
Pinaceae	Abies, Picea, Pinus, Pseudolarix, Tsuga	fir, spruce, pine, golden larch, hemlock
Taxaceae	cf. Amentotaxus, cf. Torreya	catkin yew, nutmeg yew or 'torreya'
Betulaceae	Alnus, Betula, †Palaeocarpinus	alder, birch, extinct hornbeam
Cercidiphyllaceae	†Joffrea / Cercidiphyllum	extinct / katsura
Cornaceae	Cornus	dogwood
Fagaceae	†Fagus langevinii	beech
Grossulariaceae	Ribes	currant/gooseberry
Hamamelidaceae	†Langeria magnifica	extinct witch hazel relative
Lauraceae	Sassafras hesperia	sassafras
Malvaceae	†Florissantia	extinct mallow relative
Myricaceae	Comptonia columbiana	sweet fern
Platanaceae	†Macginicarpa, †Macginitiea	extinct sycamore/plane tree relative
Rosaceae	Amelanchier, Crataegus, Prunus	serviceberry, hawthorn, cherry
Salicaceae	Populus	cottonwoods/poplars
Sapindaceae	Acer, Aesculus, †Cruciptera, Dipteronia, Koelreuteria	maples, buckeyes/horse chestnuts, golden rain trees
Trochodendraceae	†Paraconcavistylon wehrii, †Trochodendron drachukii, Trochodendron nastae, †Zizyphoides	wheel tree, extinct trochodendron relatives
Ulmaceae	Ulmus okanaganensis	elm
Vitaceae	Vitis	grape
incertae sedis	Dillhoffia cashensis	Flower of uncertain affliliation

=== Insects and other arthropods ===
The fossil insects are particularly diverse and well preserved, and include an extinct bulldog ant Macabeemyrma ovata, a species of green lacewing (Neuroptera, Chrysopidae) (Archaeochrysa profracta), and stick insects (Phasmatodea). A species of fossil freshwater crayfish (Aenigmastacus crandalli) was described from the McAbee Fossil Beds. The very high diversity of fossil insects in the McAbee fossil beds is comparable to that of modern-day tropical forest areas. Additionally, fossil palm beetles (Bruchinae) were detailed from the beds, confirming the presence of palms (Arecaceae) in the local environment in the early Eocene.

Below is an incomplete list of the insect Orders, superfamilies and families, and genera found in the McAbee Fossil Beds based on information in Archibald, Bossert, Greenwood, and Farrell (2010), Archibald, Mathewes, and Greenwood (2013), Archibald, Rasnitsyn and Akhmetiev (2005) and other sources cited in the list below, with extinct taxa denoted with a †.

Arthropod order	Super family/family	Genus/Species	Authors	Notes	Images
Ephemeroptera					
Odonata	Aeshnidae			Darners (dragonflies)	
Odonata	Megapodagrionidae			Flatwing damselflies	
Dictyoptera	Blaberidae	†Diploptera rothi	Archibald et al., 2026	blaberid cockroaches	
Dictyoptera	Hodotermitidae			harvester termites	
Dermaptera				earwigs	
Orthoptera	Prophalangopsidae			Grigs	
Orthoptera	Tettigoniidae			katydids	
Hemiptera	Aphididae			aphids	
Hemiptera	Cicadellidae			leaf hoppers	
Hemiptera	Cercopoidea			spittlebugs	
Neuroptera	Chrysopidae	†Protochrysa		Green lacewings	
Neuroptera	Chrysopidae	†Okanaganochrysa		Green lacewings	
Neuroptera	Chrysopidae	†Adamsochrysa		Green lacewings	
Neuroptera	Chrysopidae	†Archaeochrysa		Green lacewings	
Neuroptera	Hemerobiidae			brown lacewings	
Neuroptera	Osmylidae			osmylid lacewings	
Coleoptera	Cupedidae			reticulated beetles	
Coleoptera	cf. Cantharidae			soldier beetles	
Coleoptera	Cerambycidae			long horned beetles	
Coleoptera	Chrysomelidae			leaf beetles	
Coleoptera	Curculionidae			weevils, snout beetles	
Coleoptera	cf. Elateridae			click beetles	
Coleoptera	Mordellidae			tumbling flower beetles	
Mecoptera	Bittacidae			hangingflies	
Mecoptera	†Cimbrophlebiidae	†Cimbrophlebia		extinct group	
Mecoptera	Panorpidae	Panorpa		panorpid scorpionflies	
Mecoptera	†Dinopanorpidae	†Dinokanaga		extinct family	
Mecoptera	†Holcorpidae	†Holcorpa		extinct family	
Mecoptera	†Eorpidae	†Eorpa		extinct family	
Mecoptera	Eomeropidae	†Eomerope		eomeropid mecopterans	
Diptera	Bibionidae	Plecia		March flies	
Diptera	Cylindrotomidae			long-bodied crane flies	
Diptera	Limoniidae			limoniid crane flies	
Diptera	Mycetophilidae			fungus gnats	
Diptera	Tipulidae			crane flies	
Diptera	Trichoceridae			winter crane flies	
Diptera	Syrphidae			flower flies, hover flies	
Trichoptera				caddisflies	
Hymenoptera	Braconidae			braconid wasps	
Hymenoptera	Cephidae	†Cuspilongus cachecreekensis	Archibald & Rasnitsyn, 2015	Sawfly	
Hymenoptera	Cimbicidae			cimbicid wasps	
Hymenoptera	Diapriidae			diapriid wasps	
Hymenoptera	Figitidae			figitid wasps	
Hymenoptera	Formicidae	†Avitomyrmex elongatus	Archibald, Cover, & Moreau, 2006	bulldog ants	
Hymenoptera	Formicidae	†Avitomyrmex mastax	Archibald, Cover, & Moreau, 2006	bulldog ants	
Hymenoptera	Formicidae	†Avitomyrmex systenus	Archibald, Cover, & Moreau, 2006	bulldog ants	
Hymenoptera	Formicidae	†Macabeemyrma ovata	Archibald, Cover, & Moreau, 2006	bulldog ants	
Hymenoptera	Formicidae	†Ypresiomyrma bartletti	Archibald, Cover, & Moreau, 2006	bulldog ants	
Hymenoptera	Formicidae	†Ypresiomyrma orbiculata	Archibald, Cover, & Moreau, 2006	bulldog ants	
Hymenoptera	Formicidae	†Myrmeciites(?) goliath	Archibald, Cover, & Moreau, 2006	bulldog ant form taxon	
Hymenoptera	Formicidae	†Myrmeciites herculeanus	Archibald, Cover, & Moreau, 2006	bulldog ant form taxon	
Hymenoptera	Ichneumonidae			ichneumon wasps	
Hymenoptera	Proctotrupidae			proctotrupid wasps	
Hymenoptera	Siricidae	†Ypresiosirex orthosemos	Archibald & Rasnitsyn, 2015	horntail wasps	
Hymenoptera	Sphecidae			Sphecid wasps	
Hymenoptera	Tenthredinidae			tenthredinid wasps	
Hymenoptera	Vespidae			hornets	
Phasmatodea	†Susumanioidea			stick insects	

=== Collections and collecting status ===
Collections of fossils are housed in the Royal BC Museum in Victoria, B.C.; the Royal Tyrrell Museum of Palaeontology in Drumheller Alberta; the Royal Ontario Museum; the Canadian Museum of Nature in Ottawa; the Burke Museum of Natural History and Culture in Seattle, WA; as well as in university collections, principally Thompson Rivers University in Kamloops, B.C. Significant collections of fossils from the McAbee Fossil Beds were in private ownership and fossils from the McAbee Fossil Beds are listed for sale on the internet. In August 2018 a substantial private collection of fossils from McAbee was donated to the Royal British Columbia Museum.

The cessation of fossil collecting at the McAbee Fossil Beds through heritage listing is consistent with British Columbia's Fossil Management Framework which seeks to:

- clarify the rules governing the management and use of fossils;
- manage impacts on fossils from other activities;
- provide for the stewardship of significant fossil sites;
- raise internal and external awareness of the framework and the importance of fossils;
- build knowledge of the nature and extent of the resource in British Columbia; and
- clarify the rights and obligations of the public, business, government and other stakeholders.
