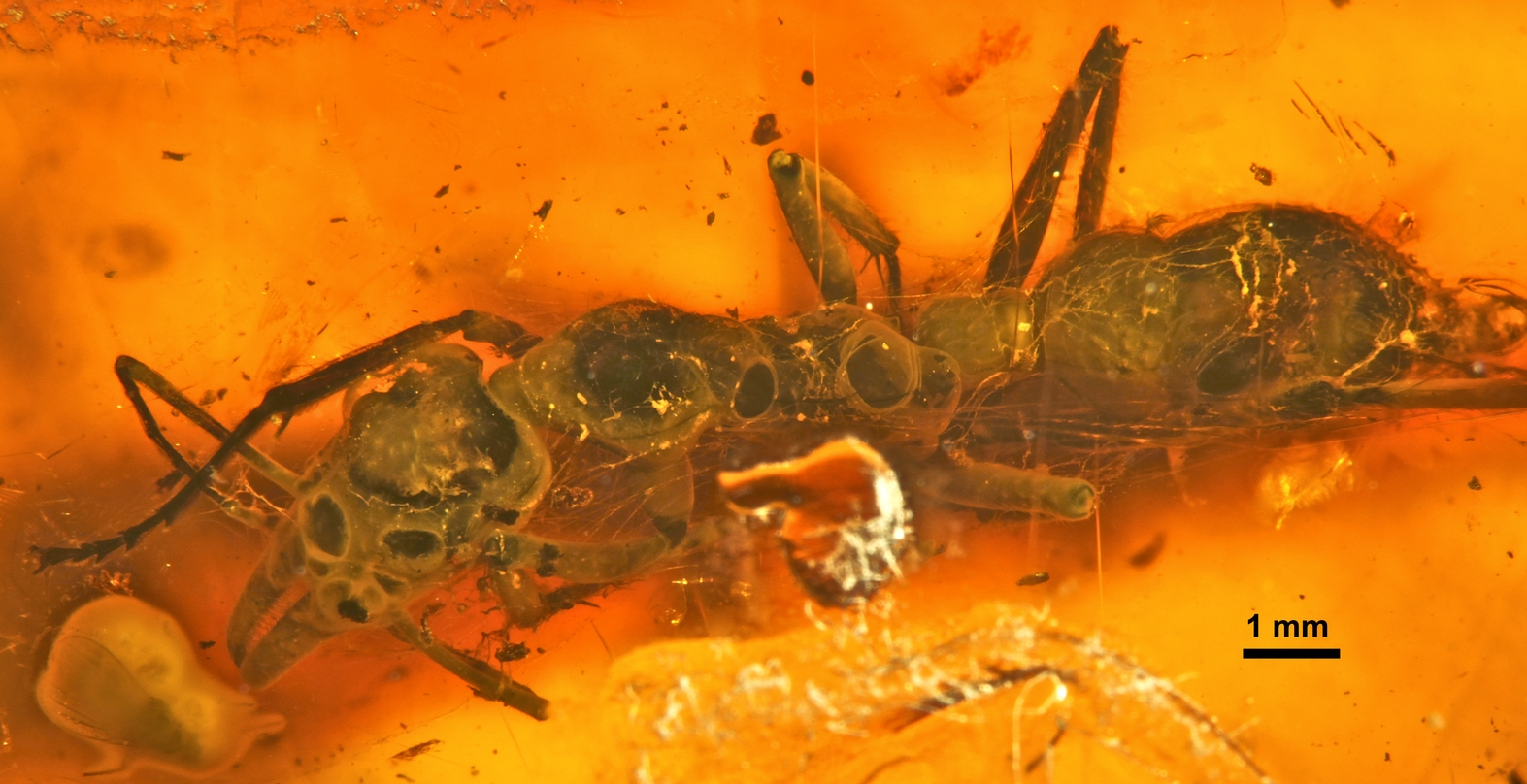
- P. longiceps

Scientific classification
- Kingdom: Animalia
- Phylum: Arthropoda
- Clade: Pancrustacea
- Class: Insecta
- Order: Hymenoptera
- Family: Formicidae
- Subfamily: Myrmeciinae
- Tribe: Prionomyrmecini
- Genus: †Prionomyrmex; Mayr, 1868

Type species
- Prionomyrmex longiceps

Species
- P. gusakovi Radchenko & Perkovsky, 2020; P. janzeni Baroni Urbani, 2000; P. longiceps Mayr, 1868; P. wappleri Dlussky, 2012

= Prionomyrmex =

Prionomyrmex Temporal range: Eocene to Late Oligocene, 56-29 Ma

Extinct genus of ants

Prionomyrmex is an extinct genus of bulldog ants in the subfamily Myrmeciinae of the family Formicidae. It was first described by Gustav Mayr in 1868, after he collected a holotype worker of P. longiceps in Baltic amber. Three species are currently described, characterised by their long mandibles, slender bodies and large size. These ants are known from the Eocene and Late Oligocene, with fossil specimens only found around Europe. It is suggested that these ants preferred to live in jungles, with one species assumed to be an arboreal nesting species. These ants had a powerful stinger that was used to subdue prey. In 2000, it was suggested by Cesare Baroni Urbani that the living species Nothomyrmecia macrops and a species he described both belonged to Prionomyrmex, but this proposal has not been widely accepted by the entomological community. Instead, scientists still classify the two genera distinctive from each other, making Nothomyrmecia a valid genus.

== Discovery and classification ==
The holotype worker for P. longiceps was collected by Austrian entomologist Gustav Mayr in 1868. The fossil, which was preserved in Baltic amber from the Eocene, was formally described in Mayr's journal article Die Ameisen des baltischen Bernsteins, designating it as the type species by monotypy (the condition of a taxonomic group having only a single taxon described) for the newly established genus Prionomyrmex. Originally, the genus was placed in the subfamily Ponerinae by Mayr, but in 1877, Italian entomologist Carlo Emery classified the genus into the subfamily Myrmeciidae (now known as Myrmeciinae), the same year Emery established the subfamily. In 1915, the tribe Prionomyrmecini was erected by American entomologist William Morton Wheeler, who had placed Prionomyrmex in it. In that year, Wheeler placed the genus back into Ponerinae without any means of justifying his decision. British myrmecologist Horace Donisthorpe would also retain the genus in Ponerinae without explanation, but William Brown Jr. would return it to Myrmeciinae in 1954.

In 2000, Baroni Urbani described a new Baltic fossil species, of which he named it Prionomyrmex janzeni. After examining specimens of the new species and Nothomyrmecia macrops, Baroni Urbani stated that the newly described species and Nothomyrmecia macrops belong to the same genus (Prionomyrmex), in which he synonymised Nothomyrmecia as a genus and treated the tribe Prionomyrmecini as a subfamily, known as Prionomyrmecinae. Prior to this, John S. Clark, the original author who described Nothomyrmecia, noted that the genus was similar in appearance to Prionomyrmex; both the heads and mandibles were identical, but the nodes were different. As the mandibles of Prionomyrmex are similar to that of Nothomyrmecia, this suggests that they are intermediate to each other. This classification was short-lived, as Nothomyrmecia was separated and treated as a valid genus from Prionomyrmex by Dlussky & Perfilieva in 2003, on the base of the fusion of an abdominal segment. Other studies published in the same year came to the same conclusions of Dlussky & Perfilieva, and the subfamily Prionomyrmecinae would later be treated as a tribe in Myrmeciinae. However, Baroni Urbani would treat the tribe as a subfamily again in both his 2005 and 2008 publications, suggesting additional evidence in favor of his former interpretation as opposed to that of Ward and Brady's arguments. In 2012, P. wappleri was described by Gennady M. Dlussky, based on a fossilised worker from the Late Oligocene, Aquitanian stage. This subsequent report that described new fossil myrmecines accepted the classification of Archibald et al. and Ward & Brady without comment on the views of Baroni Urbani.

The generic name is a combination of two words; priono derives from Greek word priōn, meaning "a saw", and myrmex, another Greek word, means "ant".

The following cladogram generated by Archibald and colleagues shows the possible phylogenetic position of Prionomyrmex among some ants of the subfamily Myrmeciinae; note that P. wappleri is absent, as the generated cladogram below was created in 2006 while the species itself was described in 2012.

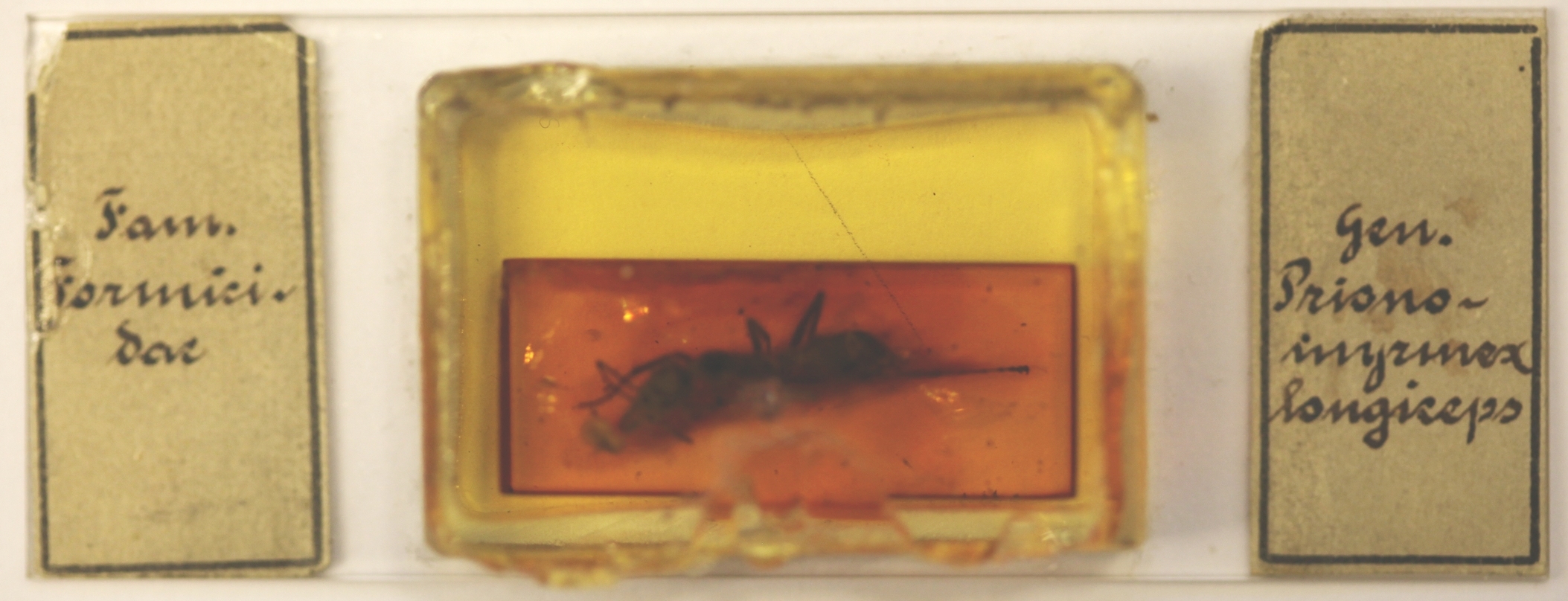
P. longiceps casent label

- Myrmeciinae
  - Archimyrmex
  - Myrmecia
  - - - Prionomyrmex janzeni
      - Prionomyrmex longiceps
    - - Macabeemyrma
      - Avitomyrmex
      - Ypresiomyrma
      - Nothomyrmecia

== Description ==
The genus is characterised by large, slender workers with elongated mandibles, which are narrow and triangular in shape. The mesosoma and appendages are also long. These ants are similar in appearance to Nothomyrmecia, but can be distinguished from the shape of their node. They also had a powerful sting located in the abdomen. Two of the three species are from the Eocene while the third species is from the Late Oligocene.

=== P. janzeni ===
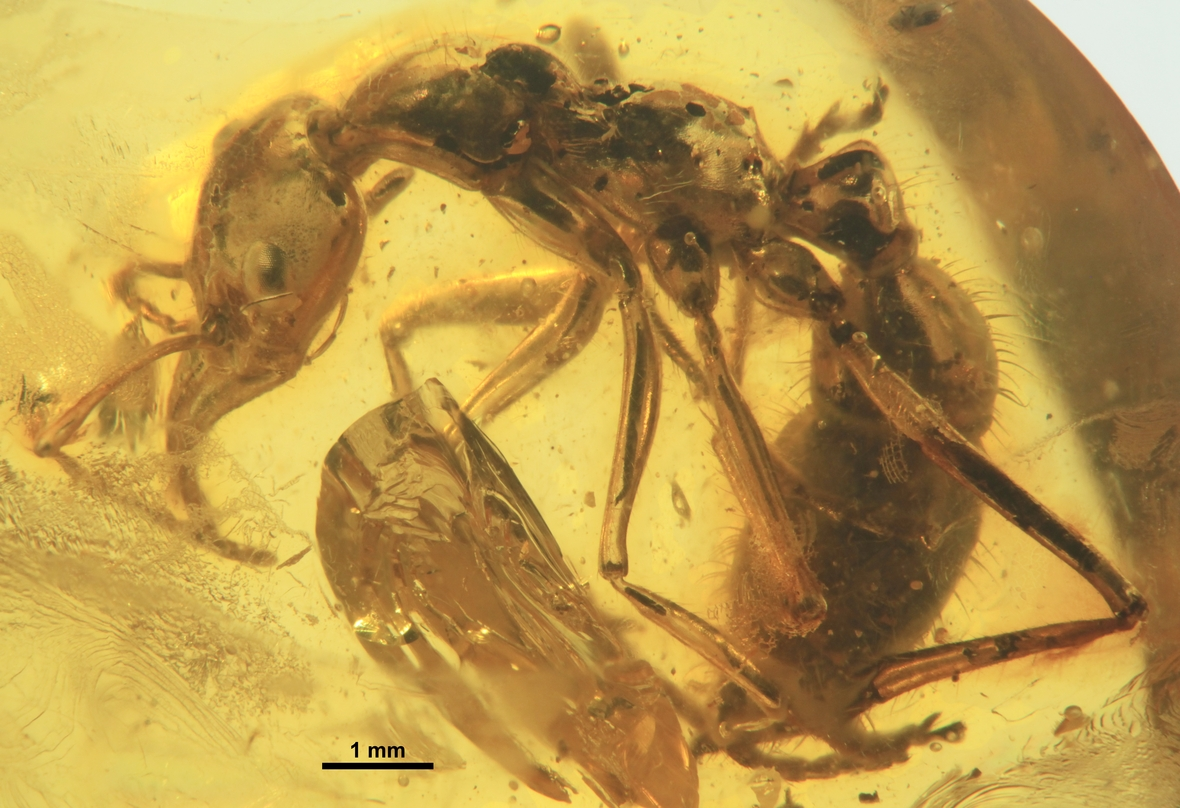
P. janzeni

P. janzeni was described by Cesare Baroni Urbani of the University of Basel, Switzerland in 2000, based on two specimens preserved in Baltic amber from Kaliningrad, Russia. The species is from the Eocene, Lutetian to Priabonian stage. Both specimens are preserved very well, with specimen number two being larger and more visible. Specimen number one is presumed to be a worker; type material includes a holotype worker and a paratype ergatogyne, donated to the Geological-Palaecontological Institute and Museum, the University of Hamburg by palaeoentomologist Jens-Wilhelm Janzen. The ant was named after Janzen by Baroni Urbani. The estimated body length is 13 millimetres (0.51 in) long with an elongated head, and large oval-shaped eyes are present. The antennae are long and consist of 12 segments with a bent scape. The mandibles are very long and curved, being three-quarters the length of the total size of the head. Both the legs and mesosoma are long and slender; unlike modern ants, P. janzeni has two spurs on the tibiae instead of one. The petiole is high and domed shape while postpetiole is bell-shaped. The gaster is long with round sides, divided into five segments. The whole body and some portions of the legs were covered by weakly curved hairs, erect and suberect. The holotype specimen is brown in colour while the paratype is black. While P. janzeni looks similar to P. longiceps, the pubescence on the scapes of P. janzeni is absent.

=== P. longiceps ===
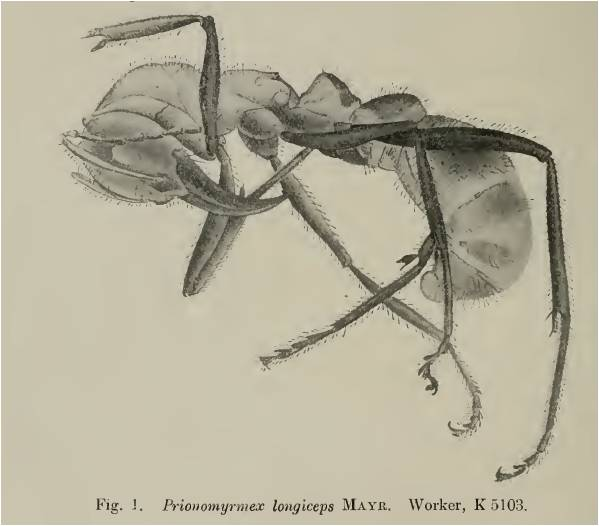
P. longiceps illustrated by Wheeler, 1915

P. longiceps was described by Gustav Mayr in 1868, based on a holotype worker collected in Baltic amber from the Eocene. The original specimen collected by Mayr, however, has been lost. The estimated body length of P. longiceps is 12 to 14 millimetres (0.47 to 0.55 in) long, with a thick petiole and large propodeal teeth. Unlike P. janzeni, P. longiceps has erect and suberect hairs on the scape. These hairs are also longer and thicker on the legs and on other body parts. The mandibles are very long and curved, and the head is longer than its total width (2.2 to 2.64 millimetres (0.087 to 0.104 in) long and 1.68 to 2.08 millimetres (0.066 to 0.082 in) wide). The legs are very long with strong claws, and a stinger is present in the abdomen. Wheeler (1915) described a male P. longiceps, commenting that the head is short but broad with very large eyes while the mandibles are small and far apart. The body is dark brown or blackish in colour, and the wings are somewhat yellowish.

=== P. wappleri ===
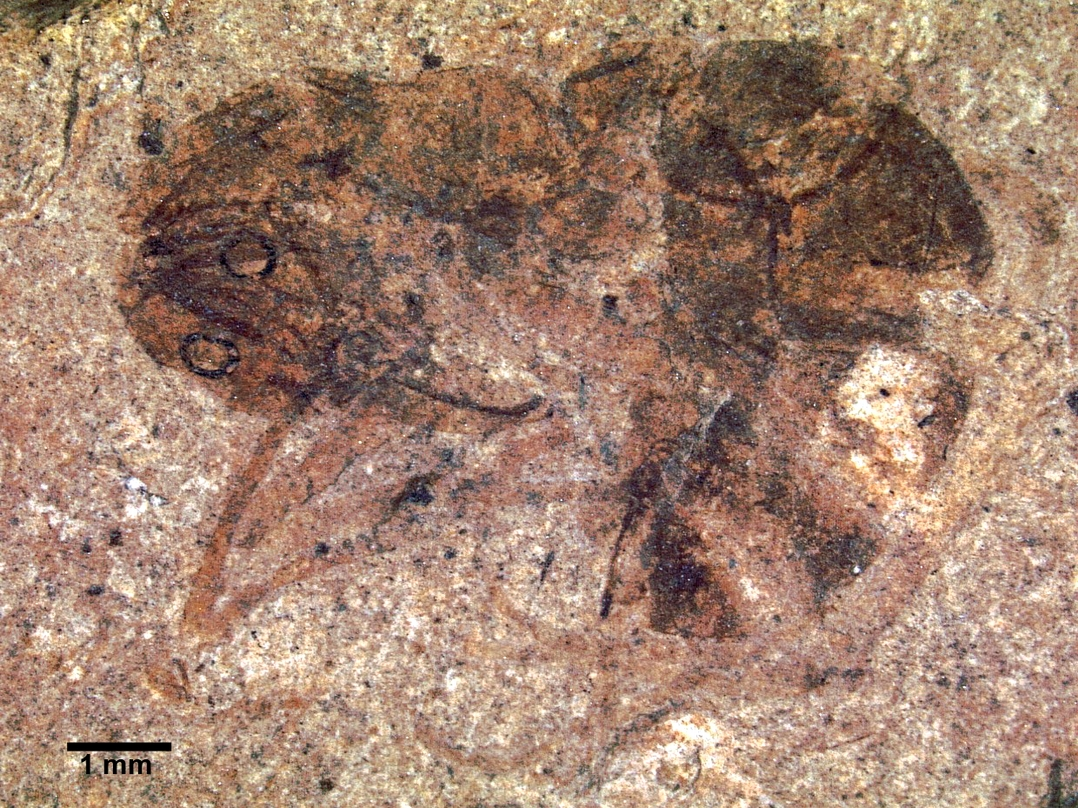
P. wappleri worker

P. wappleri was described in 2012 by Russian palaeoentomologist Gennady M. Dlussky of the Moscow State University, from a fossilised holotype worker found in Germany from the Aquitanian stage 29 to 30 million years ago. The specimen is currently housed in the Institut für Paläontologie at the University of Bonn, North Rhine-Westphalia. Dlussky coined the specific epithet wappleri from the surname "Wappler", as he named the ant after German palaeoentomologist Torsten Wappler. The estimated body length of P. wappleri is 14 millimetres (0.55 in) long, and the head is 1.35 times longer than the total width of it. The eyes are small and oval shaped, located in the upper part of the head, which is four times as long as the eyes. The mandibles are nearly three-quarters the length of the head; P. wappleri differs from P. longiceps and P. janzeni due to the apex of the clypeal lobe being pointed instead of round, and the first segment of the flagellum is only half the length of the second segment. Before the discovery of P. wappleri, extinct Myrmeciinae ants were only found from Eocene deposits. This suggests that the subfamily was still present in Europe during the Late Oligocene.

== Ecology ==
Archibald and colleagues suggested the life habits of extinct Myrmeciinae ants including Prionomyrmex may have been similar to extant ants within the subfamily. These ants foraged on the ground and possibly onto trees and low vegetation while preying on arthropods. These ants may have collected plant nectar, as Myrmecia species use this as a food source. Workers may have not recruited nest mates to food sources or lay down pheromone trails, as these ants were solitary hunters. Workers would have relied on their vision to hunt for prey and help themselves navigate.

William Morton Wheeler comments that P. longiceps were possibly an arboreal nesting species. This means the ant did not live in the soil and nested in trees instead. He assumed this due to its long legs, strong claws and long mandibles; Prionomyrmex was also assumed to be predacious, equipped with a well developed and powerful sting that was most likely used to kill prey. Prionomyrmex may have preferred a jungle habitat at low elevations, and is even more primitive in its body structure than Myrmecia. Female stylopids were known to parasite Prionomyrmex ants.
