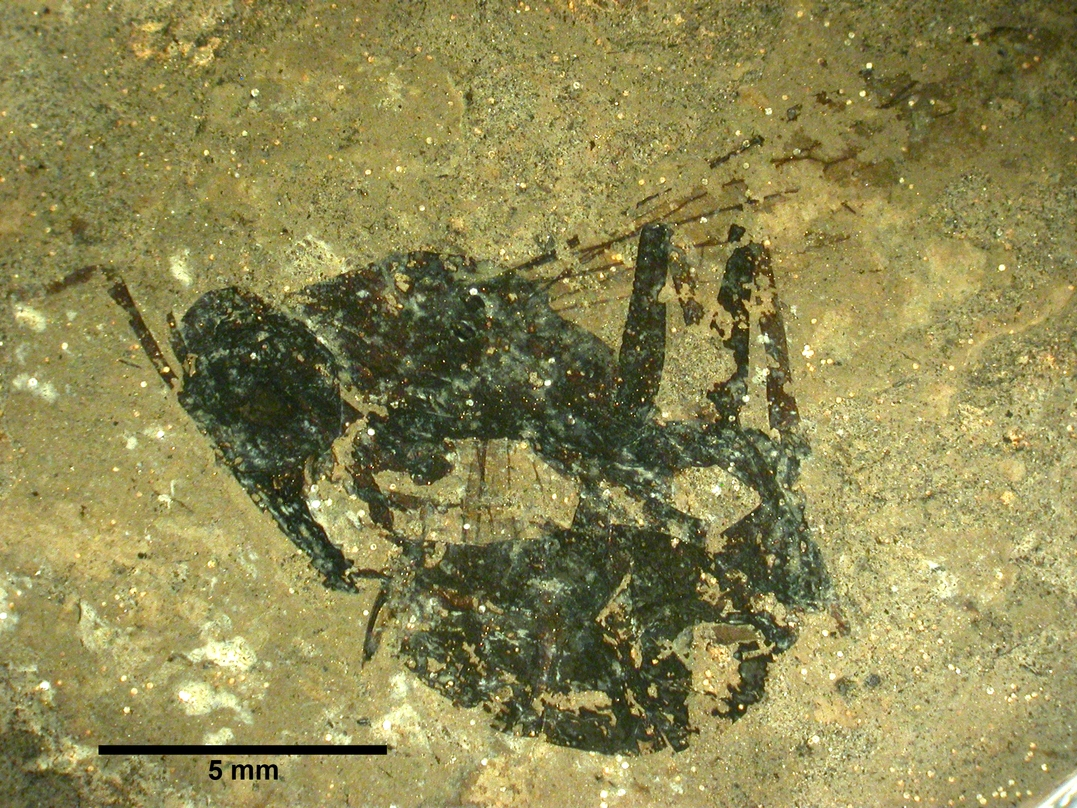
- A. wedmannae holotype

Scientific classification
- Kingdom: Animalia
- Phylum: Arthropoda
- Clade: Pancrustacea
- Class: Insecta
- Order: Hymenoptera
- Family: Formicidae
- Subfamily: Myrmeciinae
- Genus: †Archimyrmex; Cockerell, 1923

Species
- A. rostratus Cockerell, 1923; A. piatnitzkyi (Viana & Haedo Rossi, 1957); A. smekali (Rossi de Garcia, 1983); A. wedmannae Dlussky, 2012

Synonyms
- Ameghinoia Viana & Haedo Rossi, 1957; Polanskiella Rossi de Garcia, 1981

= Archimyrmex =

Archimyrmex Temporal range: Middle Eocene

Extinct genus of ants

Archimyrmex is an extinct genus of ant in the formicid subfamily Myrmeciinae, described by palaeoentomologist Theodore Cockerell in 1923. The genus contains four described species, Archimyrmex rostratus, Archimyrmex piatnitzkyi, Archimyrmex smekali and Archimyrmex wedmannae. Archimyrmex is known from a group of Middle Eocene fossils which were found in North America, South America, and Europe. The genus was initially placed in the subfamily Ponerinae, but it was later placed in Myrmeciinae; it is now believed to be the ancestor of the extant primitive genus Myrmecia from Australia. Despite this, Archimyrmex is not a member to any tribe and is regarded as incertae sedis within Myrmeciinae. However, some authors believe Archimyrmex should be assigned as incertae sedis within Formicidae. These ants can be characterised by their large mandibles and body length, ranging from 13.2 to 30 mm (0.52 to 1.18 in). They also have long, thin legs and an elongated mesosoma (thorax) and petiole.

== History and classification ==
When described the genus Archimyrmex was known from a solitary fossil preserved as an impression in fine shale of the Green River Formation in Colorado. The fossil was recovered in July 1922 from the "station 1" fossil site near the top of the Ute trail by entomologist Wilmatte Porter Cockerell. One side of the A. rostratus holotype is currently deposited in the University of Colorado paleontology collections while the counterpart is in the US National Museum, and an additional eleven fossils were known as of 2002. The holotype was first studied by palaeoentomologist Theodore Dru Alison Cockerell of the University of Colorado and his 1923 type description of the new genus and species was published in The Entomologist. The specific epithet "rostratus" is a reference to the beak-like outline of the mandibles seen in the type specimen.

Cockerell placed the genus into the subfamily Ponerinae. He noted similarities between Archimyrmex and Myrmecia and Prionomyrmex, suggesting Archimyrmex to be an intermediate between the two other genera. The genus was re-described in 1928 by palaeoentomologist William Wheeler who moved the genus from Ponerinae to Myrmicinae. This placement was not challenged until a 2003 paper by Russian palaeoentomologists G.M. Dlussky and K.S. Perfilieva, who moved the genus again, this time to the primitive Subfamily Myrmeciinae based on the close similarity between Archimyrmex and Prionomyrmex. In 1957, an additional species of fossil ant was described from the Middle Eocene Ventana Formation in the Rio Pichileufu region of Argentina by M.J. Viana and J.A. Haedo Rossi. They placed the species into a new genus, Ameghinoia as Ameghinoia" piatnitzkyi. As with Archimyrmex, the genus was first placed in Ponerinae. It was subsequently moved to Myrmeciinae by R.R. Snelling in 1981. A second Ventana Formation ant species was described in 1981 by E. Rossi de Garcia and placed into another new genus Polanskiella as P. smekali. Recovered from an outcrop of the Ventana Formation in the Rio Limay area, Rossi de Garcia distinguished the new species from "A." piatnitzkyi based on characteristics of the wing venation and because of the difference in size of the two type specimens. A series of fossils from the three genera were examined by Dlussky and Perfilieva and based on the very notable similarities between the three species, they synonymized the three genera under Archimyrmex, treating both Ameghinoia and "Polanskiella" as junior synonyms. A fourth species, A. wedmannae was described by Dlussky in 2012 based on fossils found in the Middle Eocene Messel Pit site of Germany. The specific epithet was chosen by Dlussky to honour paleoentomologist Sonja Wedmann.

Before Archimyrmex was placed into the subfamily Myrmeciinae, Wheeler classified the genus as incertae sedis (Latin for "of uncertain placement") within the ant subfamily Myrmicinae, as it could not be confidently placed into any ant tribe. Even after its placement within Myrmeciinae it was still classified as incertae sedis. However, Cesare Baroni Urbani of the University of Basel, Switzerland classified the genus as incertae sedis within the family Formicidae. Baroni Urbani justifies his decision by stating the characters of the ant are similar to those of Cariridris, an insect from the Lower Cretaceous that was once placed in Myrmeciinae, but is now incertae sedis within the subclade Aculeata. Archimyrmex also shares a similar structure to other ants and insects within the order Hymenoptera. The key diagnostic traits (synapomorphies) of Myrmeciinae ants cannot be observed although the described species have elongated scapes (the first segment of the antenna), a key diagnostic trait for Formicidae. A 2012 report describing new myrmecine fossils accepted the classification of Archibald and colleagues while disregarding Baroni Urbani's comments.

The following cladogram generated by Archibald and colleagues show the possible phylogenetic position of Archimyrmex among some ants of the subfamily Myrmeciinae; it is possible that Archimyrmex may be the ancestor of Myrmecia.

- Myrmeciinae
  - Archimyrmex
  - Myrmecia
  - - - Prionomyrmex janzeni
      - Prionomyrmex longiceps
    - - Macabeemyrma
      - Avitomyrmex
      - Ypresiomyrma
      - Nothomyrmecia

== Description ==
In general Archimyrmex individuals have a head capsule that bears a set of enlarged mandibles with either a rectangular or triangular outline. The mandibles have a mixed arrangement of teeth and denticles (smaller teeth) on the inside margin. The gynes have long legs and long mesosomas, an elongated petiole (a narrow waist between the mesosoma and gaster) which is usually smooth in profile on the upper surface. The petiole structure in combination with little to no constriction between abdominal segments III and IV is unique to the genus and separates it from the other Myrmeciinae genera.

=== A. piatnitzkyi ===
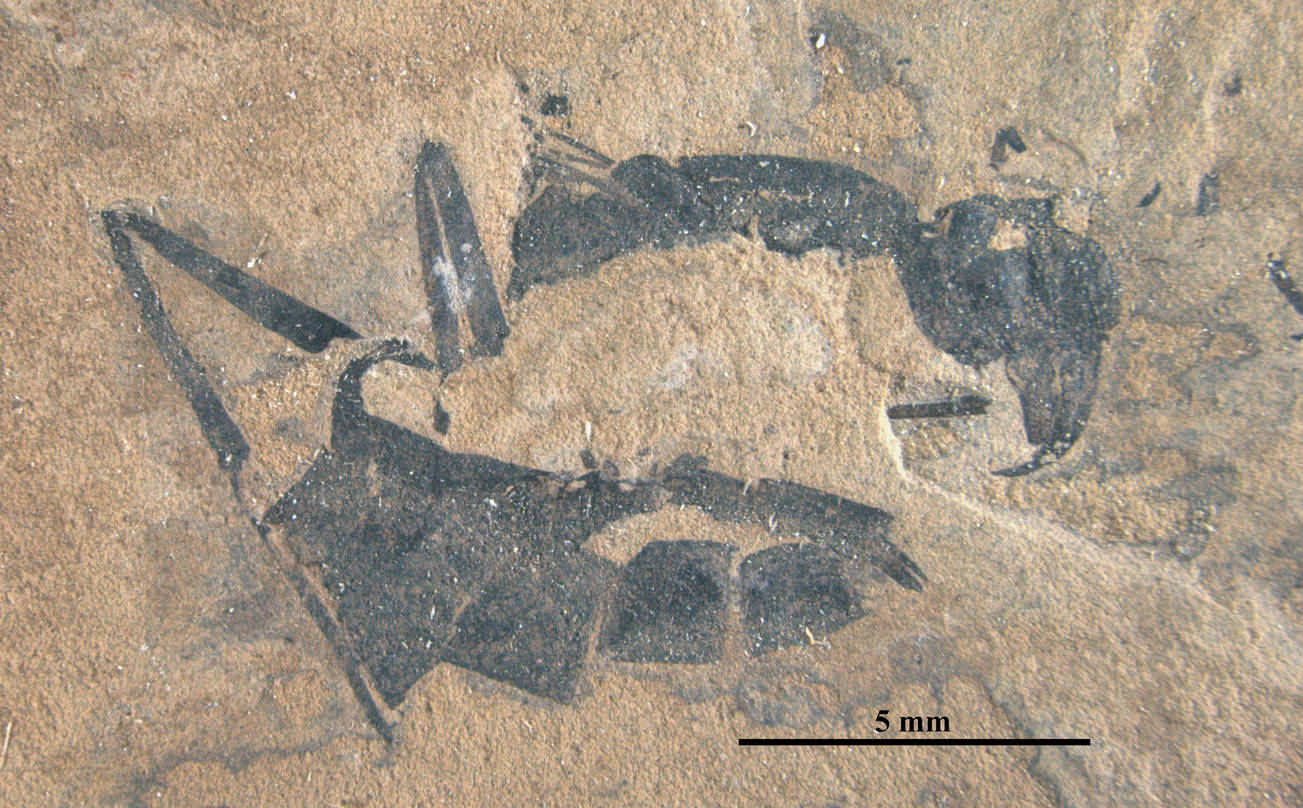
A. piatnitzkyi holotype

A. piatnitzkyi is reported from three specimens, giving a body length between 16–18 mm (0.63–0.71 in). The holotype, recovered from the Ventana Formation of the Neuquén Basin in Argentina is currently preserved at the Bernardino Rivadavia Natural Sciences Museum palaeoentomological collection. The head capsule is slightly ovoid, being a little longer than it is wide and having elongated mandibles that are notably shorter than the head. As with A. smekali, the mesosoma is massive, being between 1.7-1.8 times as long as it is tall. The legs are like those of the other species, being long and thin. Unlike the other species, the petiole of A. piatnitzkyi does not have a constricted post-petiole.

=== A. rostratus ===
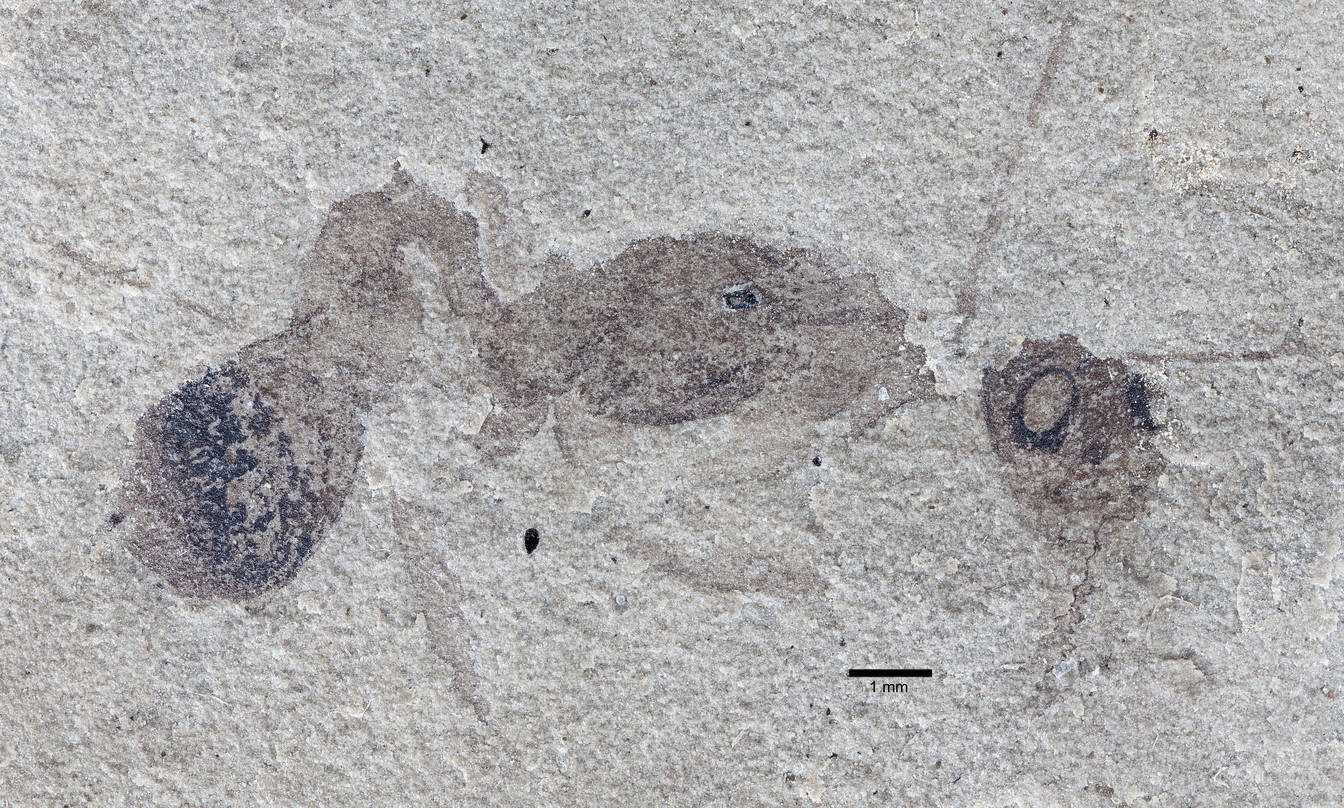
A. rostratus holotype

The type specimen numbers are UC no. 15174 and USNM no. 69617 for the part and counterpart; females of the type species A. rostratus have a body length estimated to be between 13.2–15.8 mm (0.52–0.62 in), with a small gaster that is shorter than the mesosoma and sporting a short thick sting. The length of the head when excluding the mandibles is 4 mm (0.16 in), the mesosoma is 5.3 mm (0.21 in) and the middle femur is around 3.7 mm (0.15 in). The preserved specimens from the Green River Formation are brown and the upper area of the head and gaster is black, which is similar to Myrmecia nigriceps. The head capsules have antennae borne on a scape which is long and passes the edge of the occipital margin of the head. The short, thickened mandibles have several larger teeth interspersed with small denticles, and are about 50% of the length of the head capsule. The scape is believed to be long and thin, and its mesosoma is narrow and long. The width of the scutum is greater than its length, the legs are noticeably elongated and thin, and the podeum (a narrow stalk that connects the mesosoma with the abdomen) is slightly convex.

=== A. smekali ===
The A. smekali was recovered from the Ventana Formation in Argentina. The lectotype, numbered NMW. no. 1972/1574/9, is housed in the Museum of Natural History. The lectotype female has an estimated body length of 3 cm (1.2 in) with an mesosoma that is described as "relatively massive" (being only 1.7 to 1.9 times as long as tall) and an oval shaped gaster. There is a notable constriction in the post-petiole abdominal segment not seen in the other species. The head capsule has mandibles which are about 70% as long as the head capsule, and have four to five large teeth each. The antennal scape is longer than the occipital margin and the antenna is composed of an estimated twelve segments. The legs are elongated and narrow, the propodeum is weakly convex and the petiole does not have a node (a segment between the mesosoma and gaster). A. smekali can be distinguished from other species by its massive size, the constriction in the post-petiole and the absence of the node. It was previously thought the ant had an eight-segmented antennae, but the lectotype has seven segments; Dlussky also mentions that the original description provided by Elsa Rossi de Garcia does not match the description he provided.

=== A. wedmannae ===
A. wedmannae from Germany is described from a single gyne that is approximately 23 mm (0.91 in), found in the Messel Formation. The fossil is believed to be 47 million years old. The mesosoma measures 7.4 mm (0.29 in), the length of the head is 2.8 mm (0.11 in), the scape is 3.4 mm (0.13 in), the diameter of the eyes are 1.2 mm (0.047 in) and the forewings are 10.6 mm (0.42 in). The species has a head which is shorter than it is wide, but has mandibles about as long as the head which are triangular in outline. The eyes are oval shaped. As with the three other species the antennal scape is long, one-third of the scape length protrudes past the occipital margin of the head. The pronotum in profile is either straight or weakly concave, and the petiole is weakly rounded with no node present. The propodeum has small denticles and is weakly convex, and the legs are long. The gaster has a well developed and long sting. This species can be distinguished from other Archimyrmex ants by its long mandibles; the shape of the petiole is almost the same as A. smekali, but their mandibles are much shorter and the mesosoma is more compact. The propodeum's dorsal surface is also more convex.
