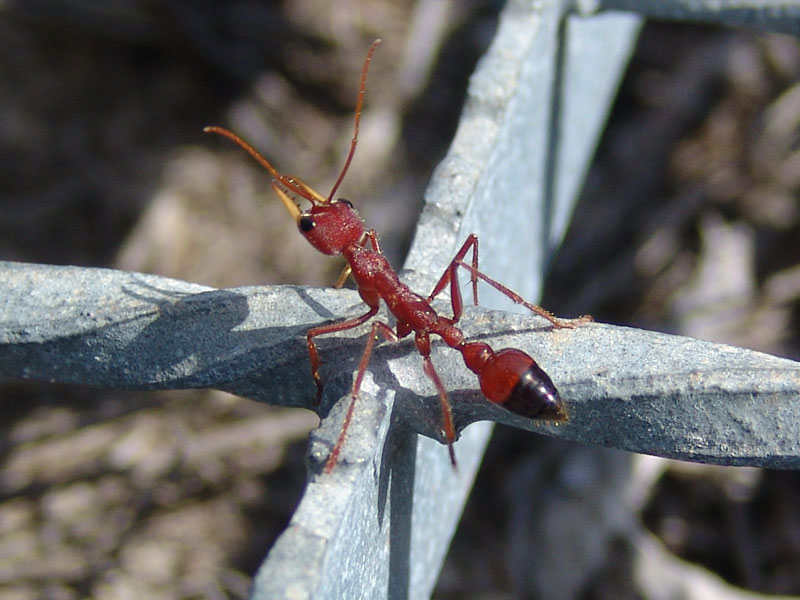
- Myrmecia gulosa

Scientific classification
- Domain: Eukaryota
- Kingdom: Animalia
- Phylum: Arthropoda
- Class: Insecta
- Order: Hymenoptera
- Family: Formicidae
- Subfamily: Myrmeciinae; Emery, 1877

Type genus
- Myrmecia

Tribes and genera
- 2 extant genera; 9? fossil genera; 2 tribes

= Myrmeciinae =

Myrmeciinae Temporal range: Eocene–Recent

Subfamily of ants

Myrmeciinae is a subfamily of the Formicidae, ants once found worldwide but now restricted to Australia and New Caledonia. This subfamily is one of several ant subfamilies which possess gamergates, female worker ants which are able to mate and reproduce, thus sustaining the colony after the loss of the queen. The Myrmeciinae subfamily was formerly composed of only one genus, Myrmecia, but the subfamily was redescribed by Ward & Brady in 2003 to include two tribes and four genera. An additional three genera, one form genus, and 9 species were described in 2006 from the Early Eocene of Denmark, Canada, and Washington. Subsequently an additional fossil genus was moved from the family Rhopalosomatidae in 2018, and a new genus was described in 2021.

== Tribes and genera ==
- Tribe Myrmeciini Emery, 1877
  - Myrmecia Fabricius, 1804
- Tribe Prionomyrmecini Wheeler, 1915
  - Nothomyrmecia Clark, 1934
  - †Prionomyrmex Mayr, 1868
  - †Propalosoma Dlussky & Rasnitsyn, 1999
  - †Tyrannomecia Jouault & Nel, 2021
  - †Ypresiomyrma Archibald, Cover & Moreau, 2006
- Tribe incertae sedis
  - †Archimyrmex Cockerell, 1923
  - †Avitomyrmex Archibald, Cover & Moreau, 2006
  - †Macabeemyrma Archibald, Cover & Moreau, 2006
- Form genus (for species belonging to the subfamily but not identifiable to current genera)
  - †Myrmeciites Archibald, Cover & Moreau, 2006

The Late Aptian Crato Formation genus Cariridris was sometimes included in Myrmeciinae, but it has is now usually classified within Ampulicidae. Two undescribed specimens in the Staatliches Museum für Naturkunde Stuttgart are known, suggesting a myrmeciine affinity.

== Classification ==
The subfamily Myrmeciinae was established by Italian entomologist Carlo Emery in 1877 under the original name Myrmeciidae. It was named after the genus Myrmecia, the type genus of the subfamily. In 1882, the subfamily was treated as a tribe by French entomologist Ernest André within the former ant family Myrmicidae, but it would later be moved to the family Poneridae in 1905.

== See also ==
- List of Myrmecia species
