= Corrie Moreau =

American entomologist

Corrie S. Moreau
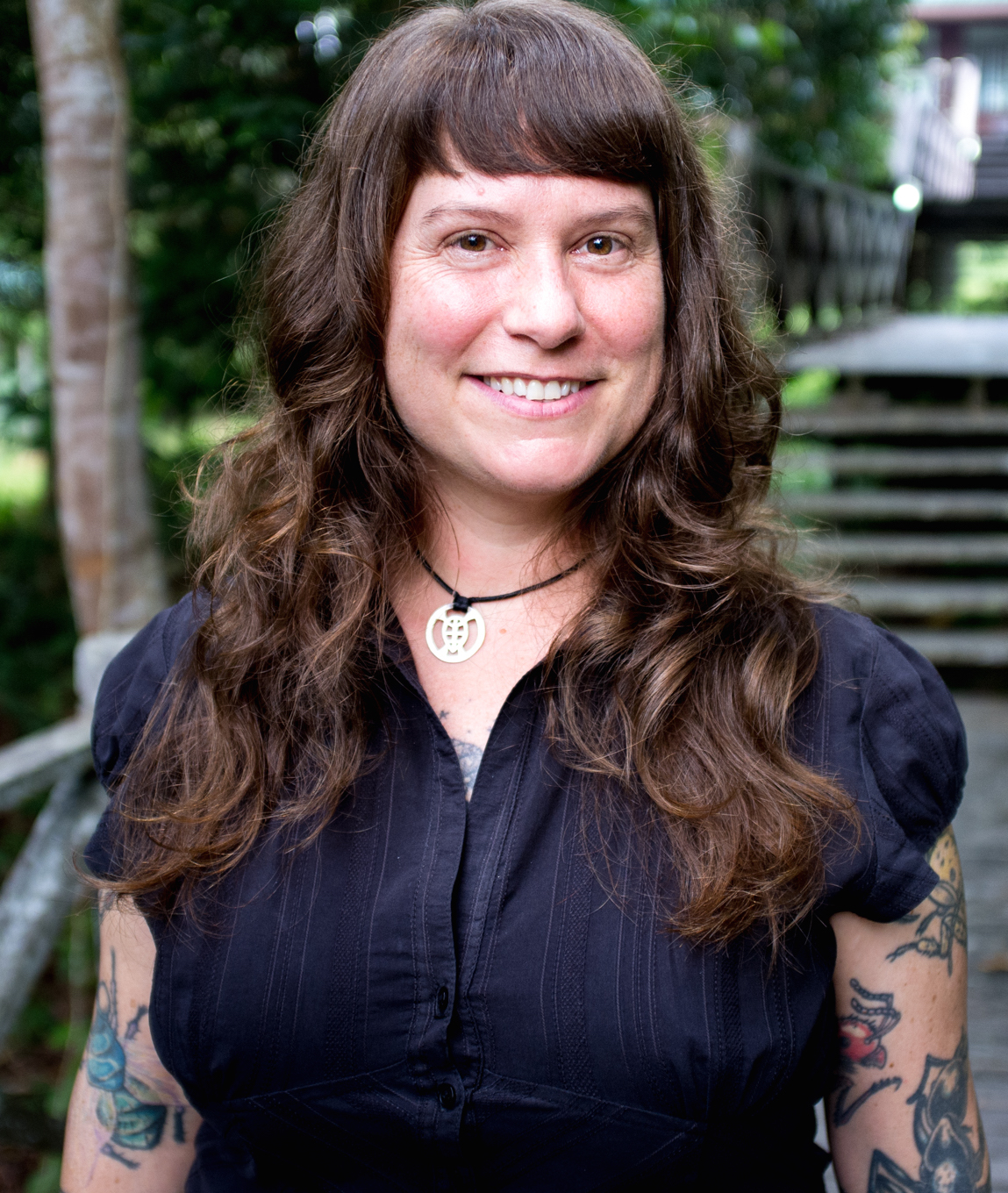
- Corrie Moreau photo by Roberto Keller-Perez
- Born: Corrie Saux; New Orleans, United States
- Citizenship: USA
- Education: Harvard University; San Francisco State University; University of California, Berkeley
- Scientific career
- Fields: Biology; Evolutionary biology
- Workplaces: American Museum of Natural History
- Thesis: Evolution and diversification of the ants (Hymenoptera: Formicidae) (2007)
- Doctoral advisor: E. O. Wilson; Naomi Pierce

Corrie S. Moreau is an evolutionary biologist and entomologist with a specialty in myrmecology, the study of ants. She is currently the Dean of Collections, professor and curator at the American Museum of Natural History in New York, NY, USA. Moreau studies the evolution, ecology, biogeography, systematics, and diversification of insects and their microbial gut-symbionts using molecular and genomic tools. She has also been an advocate for increasing women and diversity in the sciences.

== Education ==
Moreau received a PhD in biology from Harvard University (2003 – 2007) under the guidance of E. O. Wilson and Naomi Pierce.

She received a MSc from San Francisco State University and the California Academy of Sciences (2000 – 2003) and a Bachelors (1996 – 2000) from San Francisco State University.

== Career ==
After completing her Ph.D. in 2007 Corrie Moreau was selected as a Miller Research Fellows of the Miller Institute at the University of California, Berkeley. In 2008 she became an assistant curator at the Field Museum of Natural History where she stayed for 10 years being promoted to associate curator in 2014. In 2019 Moreau moved to Cornell University as full professor and director and curator of the Cornell University Insect Collection (CUIC) until 2026. She then joined the American Museum of Natural History as the Dean of Collections, Curator, Full Professor in 2026.

== Research ==
Moreau and colleagues were the first to establish the origin of the ants at 140 million years ago using molecular sequence data (40 million years older than previous estimates), and that the diversification of the ants coincided with the rise of the flowering plants (angiosperms). In addition, Moreau and Charles D. Bell showed that the tropics have been and continue to be important for the evolution of the ants. Moreau and colleagues have demonstrated the importance of gut-associated bacteria in the evolutionary and ecological success of ants through targeted bacterial and microbiome sequencing, including showing that bacterial gut symbionts are tightly linked with the evolution of herbivory in ants.

== Awards and recognition ==
In 2021 elected a Fellow of the Royal Entomological Society.

In 2020 elected a Fellow of the Entomological Society of America.

In 2018 elected a Fellow of the American Association for the Advancement of Science.

In 2018 featured by National Geographic as a Women of Impact.

In 2016 selected as a Kavli Fellow of the National Academy of Sciences.

In 2015 Moreau was included in "15 Brilliant Women Bridging the Gender Gap in Science" and in 2014 listed as "10 Women Scientists You Should Follow on Twitter".

In 2014 selected as a National Geographic Explorer – National Geographic Society.

Moreau was elected a Miller Fellow of the Miller Institute at the University of California, Berkeley (2007 – 2008).

She received two "Excellence and Distinction in Teaching Awards" from Harvard University's Derek Bok Center for Teaching and Learning (2004 & 2006).

Moreau was featured in Chapter 13 of Edward O. Wilson's 2013 book "Letters to a Young Scientist." Wilson writes "There was no bravado in Corrie, no trace of overweening pride, no pretension." Wilson goes on to state "The story of Corrie Saux Moreau's ambitious undertaking is one I feel especially important to bring to you. It suggest that courage in science born of self-confidence (without arrogance!), a willingness to take a risk but with resilience, a lack of fear of authority, a set of mind that prepares you to take a new direction if thwarted, are of great value – win or lose."

== Personal life ==
Moreau was born in New Orleans, Louisiana. Moreau is married to French chemist, Christophe Duplais. She was the subject of a museum exhibit and graphic novel, "The Romance of Ants" .

== Selected publications ==
- Moreau, C. S.; Bell, C. D.; Vila, R.; Archibald, S. B.; Pierce, N. P. (2006). "Phylogeny of the ants: Diversification in the age of angiosperms". Science. 312 (5770): 101–104. Bibcode:2006Sci...312..101M. doi:10.1126/science.1124891. PMID 16601190. S2CID 20729380.
- Russell, J. A.; Moreau, C. S.; Goldman-Huertas, B.; Fujiwara, M.; Lohman, D. J.; Pierce, N. E. (2009). "Bacterial gut symbionts are tightly linked with the evolution of herbivory in ants". Proceedings of the National Academy of Sciences, USA. 106 (50): 21236–21241. Bibcode:2009PNAS..10621236R. doi:10.1073/pnas.0907926106. PMC 2785723. PMID 19948964.
- Rubin, B. E. R.; Ree, R. H.; Moreau, C. S. (2012). "Inferring phylogenies from RAD sequence data". PLOS ONE. 7 (4) e33394. Bibcode:2012PLoSO...733394R. doi:10.1371/journal.pone.0033394. PMC 3320897. PMID 22493668.
- Moreau, C. S.; Bell, C. D. (2013). "Testing the museum versus cradle biological diversity hypothesis: Phylogeny, diversification, and ancestral biogeographic range evolution of the ants". Evolution. 67 (8): 2240–2257. doi:10.1111/evo.12105. PMID 23888848.
- Rubin, B. E. R.; Moreau, C. S. (2016). "Comparative genomics reveals convergent rates of evolution in ant-plant mutualisms". Nature Communications. 7 12679. Bibcode:2016NatCo...712679R. doi:10.1038/ncomms12679. PMC 5007375. PMID 27557866.
- Nelsen, M. P.; Ree, R. H.; Moreau, C. S (2018). "Ant-plant interactions evolved through increasing interdependence". Proceedings of the National Academy of Sciences, USA. 115 (48): 12253–12258. Bibcode:2018PNAS..11512253N. doi:10.1073/pnas.1719794115. PMC 6275543. PMID 30420513.
- Grewe, F., Kronforst, M. R., Pierce, N. E. & Moreau, C. S. (2021). Museum genomics reveals the Xerces blue butterfly (Glaucopsyche xerces) was a distinct species driven to extinction. Biology Letters 17: 20210123. doi: 10.1098/rsbl.2021.0123.
- Duplais, C., Sarou-Kanian, V., Massiot, D., Hassan, A., Perrone, B., Estevez, Y., Wertz, J. T., Martineau, E., Farjon, J., Giraudeau, P. & Moreau, C. S. (2021). Gut bacteria are essential for normal cuticle development in herbivorous turtle ants. Nature Communications 12: 676. doi: 10.1038/s41467-021-21065-y.
- Suissa, J. S., Li, F.-W. & Moreau, C. S. (2024). Convergent evolution of fern nectaries facilitated independent recruitment of ant-bodyguards from flowering plants. Nature Communications 15: 4392. doi: 10.1038/s41467-024-48646-x
- Hu, Y. & Moreau, C. S. (2026) Nutritional symbiosis between ants and their symbiotic microbes. Annual Review of Entomology 71: 35-49. doi: 10.1146/annurev-ento-121423-013513

== See also ==
- Myrmecology
