= Trail pheromone =

Bodily secreted chemicals that affect the target's behavior

Trail pheromones are semiochemicals secreted from the body of an individual to affect the behavior of another individual receiving it. Trail pheromones often serve as a multi purpose chemical secretion that leads members of its own species towards a food source, while representing a territorial mark in the form of an allomone to organisms outside of their species. Specifically, trail pheromones are often incorporated with secretions of more than one exocrine gland to produce a higher degree of specificity. Considered one of the primary chemical signaling methods in which many social insects depend on, trail pheromone deposition can be considered one of the main facets to explain the success of social insect communication today. Many species of ants, including those in the genus Crematogaster use trail pheromones.

== Background ==
In 1962, Harvard professor Edward O. Wilson published one of the first concrete studies constructing the groundwork for the notion of trail pheromones. Claiming an odor trail is deposited by the sting apparatus of the hymenopteran Solenopsis saevissima which results in a pathway from the colony to a food source, this study encouraged further investigation of how this chemical is laid, how it affects communication between species within and outside of its own, the evolution of the semiochemical, etc.

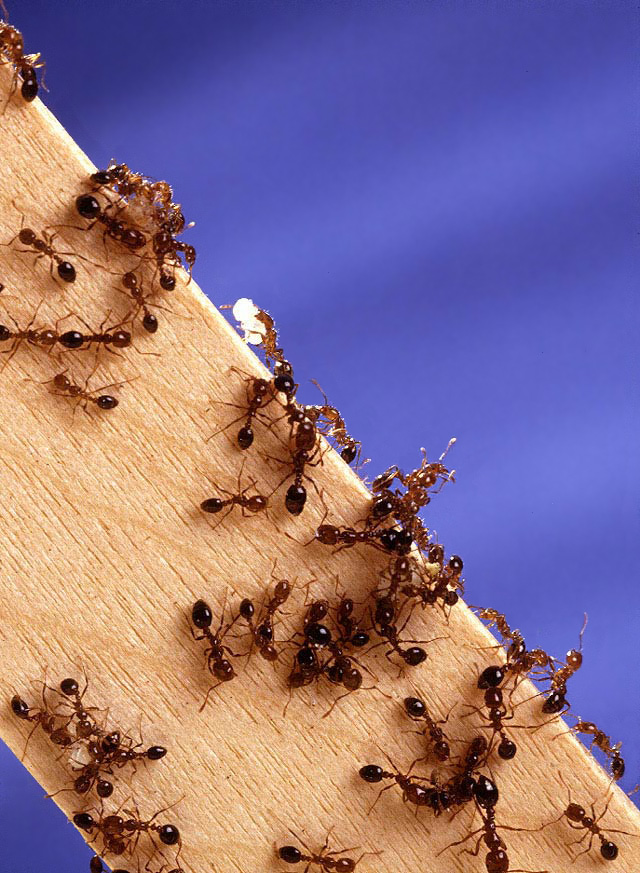
Fire ants are an example of a social insect species who depend on trail pheromones to obtain food for their colony.

== Mechanism ==
The pheromone is synthesized in the same region as venom, or other primary hormonal departments within the organism. Often, trail pheromone synthesis occurs in the ventral venom gland, poison gland, Dufour's gland, sternal gland, or hindgut. When secreted, the pheromone is dropped in a blotch-like fashion from the foraging organism onto the surface leading to the food source. As the organism proceeds to the food source, the trail pheromone creates a narrow and precise pathway between the food source and the nesting location, which another organism of the same species, and often the same nest, follows precisely. Commonly, an organism, when initially laying down the trail may renew the trail a number of times to demonstrate the value of the food source while running in tandem. Once the trail is laid, other members of the species will recognize the chemical signal and follow the trail, and each individually renew the trail on the way back to the home source. While this pheromone is constantly deposited by its members, the chemicals diffuse up into the environment propagating its message. Once the food source runs out the organisms will simply skip the task of renewing the trail on the way back, thus resulting in the diffusion and weakening of the pheromone. Studies have shown that with quality of food, distance from nest, and amounts of food, the strength of the trail pheromone may vary. Often the foraging individual may synthesize the trail pheromone as a mixture of chemicals produced by different glands which allows such specificity. While members of the same species who discovered the food constantly renew this trail pathway, as the chemical is secreted into the environment as a signal for food in their umwelt, the very same chemical can often be interpreted as a territorial mark for outside species.

== Insects that employ trail pheromones ==
=== Ants ===
Ants typically use trail pheromones to coordinate roles like nest defense and foraging. Ants can produce a trail of defensive secretions that trigger an alarm response within their nestmates. In regards to foraging, an ant can communicate the quality of a food source to its colony; the more rewarding a food source is, the higher the concentration of the trail produced. Additionally, some species, like Lasius niger ants, can "eavesdrop" on the trails produced by another species in order to procure food.

Myrmicine ants produce their trail pheromones through their poison glands. The major component in the trail pheromones secreted by Pristomyrex pungens is 6-n-pentyl-2-pyrone; several monoterpenes were also found in the secretion, but they provided only marginal effects when combined with the former. The major components found in the secretions of Aphaenogaster rudis include anabaseine, anabasine, and 2,3'-bipyridyl, though the third contributes less than the other two. When secreted, this trail pheromone does not recruit ants directly from their nest; instead, worker ants may stumble upon to the trail unintentionally and follow it thereafter to the food source.

=== Bees ===
Bees can use trail pheromones to mark food sources and the entrance of their hives. Oftentimes, when finding a source, bees will mark that exact location as well as secreting pheromones along the flight back to their hives. Employment of trail pheromones is extensively studied in honey bees and stingless bees, for both are highly social.

The trail pheromone of the stingless bee Trigona recursa is produced by its labial glands. One of its key compounds is hexyl decanoate, and when secreted, the pheromone will recruit other bees towards the source. The stingless bee Scaptotrigona pectoralis, like ants, can utilize another colony's food trail. Specifically, they can learn foreign pheromone trails at a source, broadening their options for foraging. However, in some cases of aggressive bees, like Trigona corvina, encounters between individuals from different colonies at a food source will result in fights and ultimately death amongst both parties.

=== Termites ===
Termites use trail pheromones primarily as a means of foraging. They can lay pheromones along a trail as their abdomens touch the ground, specifically through their abdominal sternal glands. As the other termites follow, they will continue to add to the trail.

The basal termite Mastotermes darwiniensis produces trail pheromones from at least two sternal glands despite every other species producing theirs from only one. This pheromone, composed solely of a norsesquiterpene alcohol, elicits trail-following from other termites. As aforementioned, these successive termites can add to the trail, depending if it is used for foraging or recruiting workers to complete tasks. In the case of Reticulitermes santonensis, foraging trails have spotted markings throughout the path, whereas recruitment trails are more continuous from the termites dragging their bodies along the path.

== Ecological significance ==
Trail pheromone deposition from an organism is correlated with its environment. In the event where a food source is identified and a trail pheromone is deposited, certain wildlife may flock towards or away from the trail causing temporary or dispersal of the population or individual. With relocation of wildlife, surrounding plant life may change as well; for example, pollen attached to the migrating organism is also relocating, thus may potentially regenerate in different patches.

=== Abiotic factors affecting trail pheromones ===
Temperature
When the foraging organism's optimal foraging temperature is present, the organism will be more likely to search for food. Often, the further temperature falls out of this range, the less likely foraging will occur, thus, the less likely trail pheromones will be deposited.
Season
Alongside with temperature, foraging occurs more during some seasons than others. With a change in season comes additional factors: a change in predators organism to avoid, change in food supply, and change in light availability. Often foraging organisms choose preference over such factors.
Humidity
If it is too humid or not humid enough, organisms may choose not to forage.
Other chemicals
Other surrounding chemicals may interfere with strength of pheromones.

=== Biotic factors affecting trail pheromones ===
Surrounding animals
Although the pheromone may diffuse off as a territorial representation of the foraging organism, that does not secure the safety of the organism. In fact, this act may do the opposite and attract competing wildlife. With more surrounding predators, or competitors, comes more difficulty with foraging for a food source. Especially in cases were food is scarce, surrounding organism. Depending on the cost vs benefits tradeoff, an organism, in a situation where it may need the food supply, may be willing to risk the dangers to obtain it. Also, with more predators or competitors out there, the risks of foraging increase.
Surrounding plants
Factors such as type and abundance of surrounding plants in an environment may certainly affect the degree of trail pheromone potency. Plants residing in close proximity to the odor trail may emit an abundance of chemicals which can either mask, change, or possibly even help propagate the signal. Additionally, areas saturated with plant life may block or alter trail pheromone diffusion.
