= John S. Clark =

Scottish-born Australian entomologist and myrmecologist

- Born: 21 March 1885; Glasgow, Scotland
- Died: 1 June 1956 (aged 71); Mooroolbark, Victoria
- Citizenship: Australian
- Known for: Contributions to myrmecology
- Spouses: Maggie Forbes (m. 1908; died 1935) Phyllis Marjorie Claringbull (m. 1939; died 1943)
- Children: 6
- Scientific career
- Fields: Entomology; Myrmecology
- Workplaces: Western Australia Department of Agriculture; Museum Victoria

John S. Clark (21 March 1885 – 1 June 1956) was a Scottish-born Australian entomologist and myrmecologist known for his study of Australian ants. Born in Glasgow, he developed an interest in entomology at a young age. Clark first arrived in Australia in 1905 and originally worked for the state railways in Queensland. He developed an interest in ants shortly afterwards, collecting his first specimens in North Queensland. He married his first wife, Maggie Forbes in 1908, who bore four children, and died in 1935. He married his second wife, Phyllis Marjorie Claringbulls in 1939 and had two daughters with her. On her suicide in 1943, Clark sent his daughters to an orphanage.

In 1919, Clark worked as the assistant to the entomologist on probation in the Western Australian Department of Agriculture, but in 1920, he took on this position full-time. He started to publish his first articles about pest insects and ants from 1921; in 1926 he became an entomologist at the National Museum in Melbourne, remaining there for 20 years. Clark continued to publish more articles until he resigned from the National Museum of Victoria in 1944. Living in poverty, Clark lived a reclusive life, publishing his last book in 1951. He died on 1 June 1956 at the age of 71. One of Clark's most notable achievements was describing Nothomyrmecia macrops, the most primitive living ant. Several ants have been named after him in recognition of his contributions.

== Early life ==
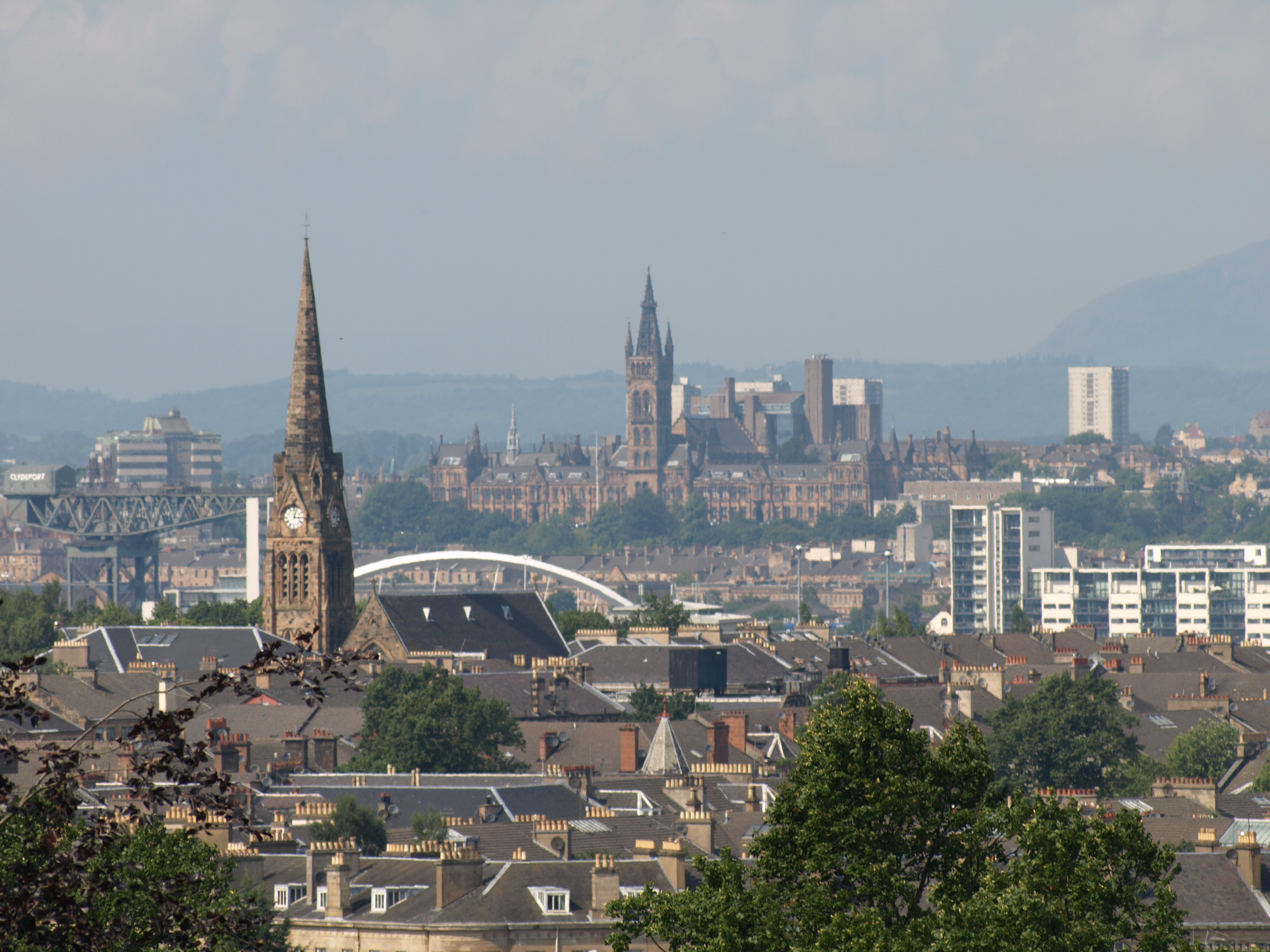
Glasgow, where Clark was born

John S. Clark was born on 21 March 1885 in Glasgow, Scotland, to parents James Souttar Clark, a coach-painter, and Maggie Clark (née Scott). At an early age, Clark had an interest in entomology throughout his years in Glasgow and adult life in Australia. Clark migrated to Australia in 1905 with little formal education but found himself working for the state railways in Queensland. There, he found an interest in ants and made his first collection of specimens in North Queensland. In May 1908, Clark married his first wife, Maggie Forbes, at the Cairns Presbyterian Church. After their marriage, they moved to Geraldton in Western Australia, where Clark worked for the railways as a wheelwright. He had one son and three daughters with Forbes; Forbes later died from heart disease in 1935.

== Career ==
Australian entomologist Leslie John William Newman of the Western Australian Department of Agriculture noticed Clark's enthusiasm for natural history, and on probation, took Clark in as the assistant to the entomologist in 1919. In 1920, Clark's position in the Department of Agriculture was confirmed; due to this, Clark and his family moved to Perth. He began publishing his first papers discussing the history of entomology in Western Australia in 1921, and also basic articles about ants, insect pests in Australian forests and myrmecophilous beetles. Three years after his articles were first published, Clark was promoted to assistant-entomologist. Scientists attending the 1926 Australasian Association for the Advancement of Science suggested that Clark should apply for a position as "entomologist" at the National Museum of Victoria, in which he was appointed in late 1926 and began working there in 1927. After working for the museum, he found museum work "not to his liking" and tried to apply for the post of "economic entomologist" in New Guinea, which at the time was an Australian administered-territory. However, this was unsuccessful for Clark, who remained at the National Museum of Victoria for nearly 20 years. In 1933, Clark sold 8,000 ant specimens he collected to the museum for about £200.

Following the death of his first wife in 1935, Clark moved from Hawthorn to Ferntree Gully in Melbourne. A couple of years later in 1939, he married his second wife, Phyllis Marjorie Claringbull, at the Office of the Government Statist, bearing two more daughters. Claringbull committed suicide in 1943, three months after she gave birth to her second daughter; Clark later sent them to an orphanage as he was unable to look after them. Clark's intemperate attitude to his peers and superiors and lack of qualifications bedevilled his career, although he was welcoming to amateurs. In 1944, Clark resigned from the National Museum of Victoria after Australian botanist Richard Pescott became the director of the museum. As a result, he moved to Mooroolbark and lived in poverty, losing all of his entitlements. Due to his reputable view as an authority on ants, Clark worked on a monograph of ants in Australia, supported by the Commonwealth Scientific and Industrial Research Organisation through grants. His first volume was published in 1951, which covered the Australian bulldog ants (subfamily Myrmeciinae). However, the first volume received poor reviews, and no further volume was released. In fact, it is unknown whether or not any further volume will be released.

== Research ==
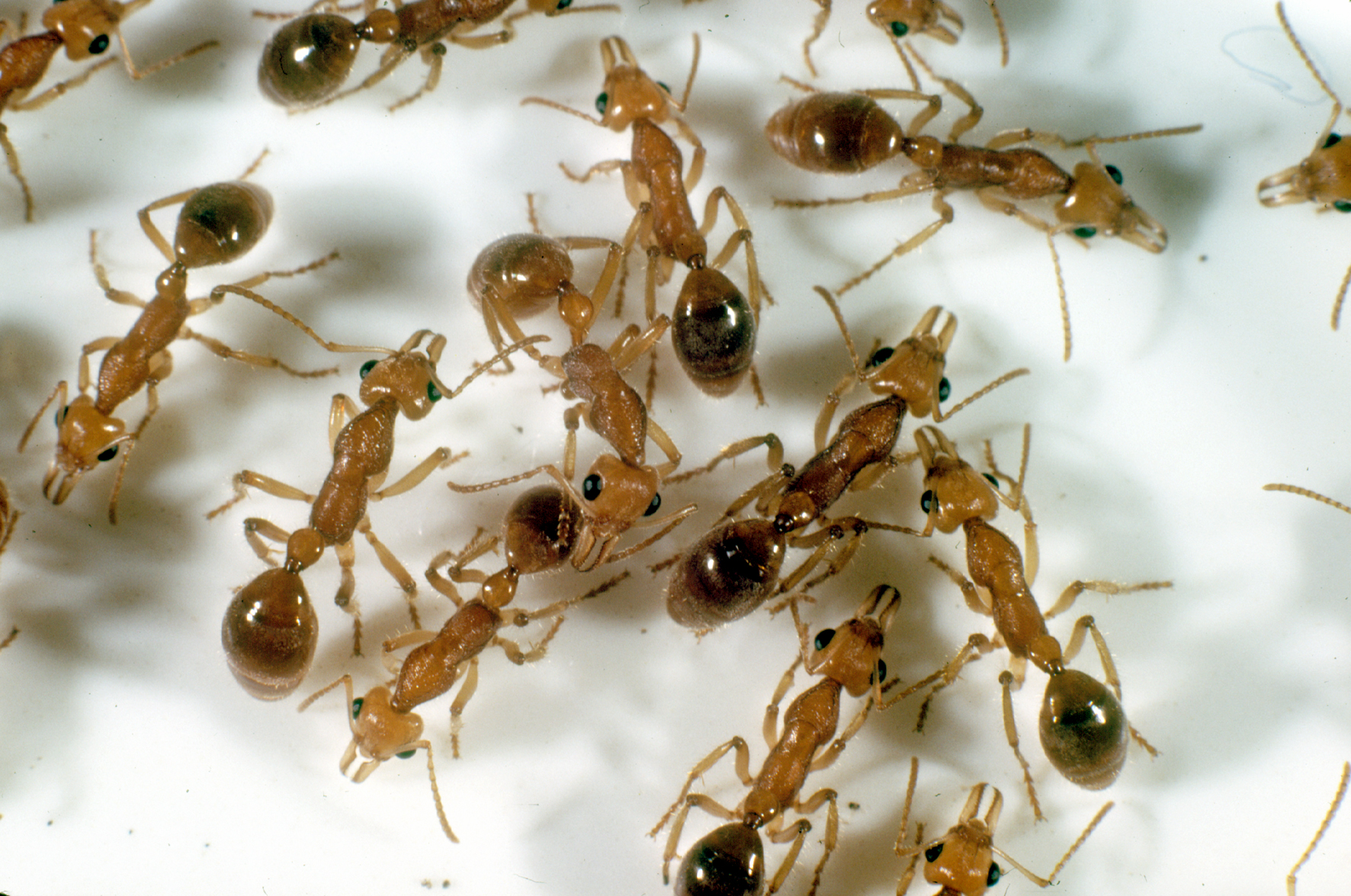
Nothomyrmecia was described by Clark in 1934, and is considered to be the most primitive ant alive

Aside from some papers published discussing myrmecophilous beetles and insect pests in forests, Clark predominately researched and published articles about the taxonomy of Australian ants. All of his articles and monographs were published in Australia. Throughout his career, Clark described around 200 different species of ants, but half of these may be synonyms. He worked and researched with all of the main groups of Australian ants, but his research and revisionary efforts were extensive with members of the former subfamily Cerapachyinae (now Dorylinae), especially those of Phyracaces, the Myrmeciinae, Rhytidoponera and members of the tribe Dolichoderini.

Clark is most notable for describing the dinosaur ant (Nothomyrmecia macrops), which is the most primitive living ant in the world and second most primitive when the fossil record is included. The first collection of Nothomyrmecia was made in December 1931 by Amy Crocker (Note: Referred to as Miss. A. E. Baesjou in Clark's article.) who collected specimens of two worker ants, reportedly near the Russell Range from Israelite Bay in Western Australia. Crocker sent the two specimens to Clark at the museum for study; in 1934, Clark published a formal description of Nothomyrmecia as a completely new genus of the Myrmeciinae. He did so because the two specimens (which then became the syntypes) bore no resemblance to any ant species he knew of, although they did share similar morphological characteristics with the extinct genus Prionomyrmex. This unusual ant remained unknown to scientists, causing intense scientific interest in the early 1950s. Over three decades, however, teams of Australian and American collectors failed to re-find it after they initiated a series of searches. Then, in 1977, entomologist Robert Taylor and his party of entomologists from Canberra found a solitary worker ant at Poochera, southeast of Ceduna, some 1,300 km (810 mi) from the reported site of the 1931 discovery. After 46 years of searching for it, entomologists have dubbed the ant the "Holy Grail" of myrmecology. Such discovery of Nothomyrmecia and its general nature marks it as one of Clark's most notable achievements.

== Death and recognition ==
Clark died at his Mooroolbark home on 1 June 1956, at the age of 71. American entomologist William Brown Jr. notes that Clark was living the life of a "recluse" during his declining years. Clark was buried in Burwood Cemetery. At the time of his death, the majority of his ant collection were housed in the National Museum of Victoria, the Natural History Museum in London and the Museum of Comparative Zoology in Cambridge. One of Clark's daughters, Ellen Clark, was a renowned naturalist. She had worked with her father at the museum in 1940 and was the secretary of the virus department of the Walter and Eliza Hall Institute of Medical Research. As well as that, she worked for the Argus and Australasian and published papers on influenza virus research and crustaceans.

A number of ants have been named after Clark. The holotype of Polyrhachis clarki was originally collected by Clark, but it was not described until 2013. There, the author of the article named the ant after him. Leptogenys clarki is another ant named after Clark for his contributions towards Australian ants, being described by American entomologist William Morton Wheeler in 1933. Ants he collected that bear his name include Dolichoderus clarki, Plagiolepis clarki and Stigmacros clarki.

== Published works ==
Over the course of his career, Clark published over 35 entomological papers. The following publications are found at the Hymenoptera Online Database:

Books

- Clark, J.S. (1951). The Formicidae of Australia (Volume 1). Subfamily Myrmeciinae (PDF). Melbourne, Victoria: CSIRO Publishing. pp. 1–230.

Journals

- Clark, J.S. (1924). "Australian Formicidae" (PDF). Journal of the Royal Society of Western Australia. 9 (2): 72–89.
- Clark, J.S. (1924). "Australian Formicidae" (PDF). Journal of the Royal Society of Western Australia. 10 (12): 75–89.
- Clark, J.S. (1925). "The ants of Victoria. (Part 1.)" (PDF). Victorian Naturalist. 42: 58–64.
- Clark, J.S. (1925). "The ants of Victoria. (Part 2.)" (PDF). Victorian Naturalist. 42: 135–144. doi:10.5281/zenodo.26621.
- Clark, J.S. (1926). "Australian Formicidae" (PDF). Journal of the Royal Society of Western Australia. 12: 43–52. doi:10.5281/zenodo.26622.
- Clark, J.S. (1927). "The ants of Victoria. [Part III.]" (PDF). Victorian Naturalist. 44: 33–40. doi:10.5281/zenodo.26623.
- Clark, J.S. (1928). "Entomological reports. Formicidae. Pages 39–44, in Report of the Victorian Field Naturalists' Expedition through the Western District of Victoria in October, 1927" (PDF). Victorian Naturalist. 45: 1–52.
- Clark, J.S. (1928). "Ants from north Queensland" (PDF). Victorian Naturalist. 45: 169–171. doi:10.5281/zenodo.26624.
- Clark, J.S. (1928). "Australian Formicidae" (PDF). Journal of the Royal Society of Western Australia. 14 (4): 29–41.
- Clark, J.S. (1929). "Contributions to the fauna of Rottnest Island. No. III. The ants". Journal of the Royal Society of Western Australia. 15: 55–56.
- Clark, J.S. (1929). "Results of a collecting trip to the Cann River, East Gippsland" (PDF). Victorian Naturalist. 46: 115–123. doi:10.5281/zenodo.26625.
- Clark, J.S. (1930). "New Formicidae, with notes on some little-known species" (PDF). Proceedings of the Royal Society of Victoria. 43 (1): 2–25. doi:10.5281/zenodo.26628.
- Clark, J.S. (1930). "Some new Australian Formicidae" (PDF). Proceedings of the Royal Society of Victoria. 42 (11): 116–128. doi:10.5281/zenodo.266268.
- Clark, J.S. (1930). "The Australian ants of the genus Dolichoderus, subgenus Hypoclinea Mayr" (PDF). Australian Zoologist. 6 (3): 252–268. doi:10.5281/zenodo.26627.
- Clark, J.S. (1934). "Ants from the Otway Ranges" (PDF). Memoirs of the National Museum of Victoria. 8: 48–73. doi:10.5281/zenodo.26631.
- Clark, J.S. (1934). "New Australian ants" (PDF). Memoirs of the National Museum of Victoria. 8: 21–47. doi:10.5281/zenodo.26630.
- Clark, J.S. (1934). "Notes on Australian ants, with descriptions of new species and a new genus" (PDF). Memoirs of the National Museum of Victoria. 8: 5–20. doi:10.5281/zenodo.26629.
- Clark, J.S. (1936). "A revision of Australian species of Rhytidoponera Mayr (Formicidae)" (PDF). Memoirs of the National Museum of Victoria. 9: 14–88. doi:10.5281/zenodo.26632.
- Clark, J.S. (1938). "Reports of the McCoy Society for field investigation and research. No. 2. Sir Joseph Banks Islands. 10. Formicidae" (PDF). Proceedings of the Royal Society of Victoria. 50: 356–382. doi:10.5281/zenodo.26633.
- Clark, J.S. (1941). "Australian Formicidae. Notes and new species" (PDF). Memoirs of the National Museum of Victoria. 12: 71–93. doi:10.5281/zenodo.26634.
- Clark, J.S. (1941). "Notes on the Argentine ant and other exotic ants introduced into Australia". Memoirs of the National Museum of Victoria. 12: 59–70. doi:10.24199/j.mmv.1941.12.05.
- Clark, J.S. (1943). "A revision of the genus Promyrmecia Emery (Formicidae)" (PDF). Memoirs of the National Museum of Victoria. 13: 83–149. ISSN 0083-5986.
