= Chadinga Conservation Park =

Protected area in South Australia

- IUCN category VI (protected area with sustainable use of natural resources)
- Location within South Australia
- Location: South Australia
- Nearest city: Penong, South Australia
- Coordinates: 31°58′36.22″S 132°51′20.15″E
- Area: 118.54 km^{2} (45.77 sq mi)
- Established: 11 November 1993
- Governing body: Department for Environment and Water

Chadinga Conservation Park, formerly the Chadinga Conservation Reserve, is a protected area in the Australian state of South Australia located in the Chadinga Dunes on the western side of Lake MacDonnell, in the locality of Penong. The park is classified as an IUCN Category VI protected area.

The conservation park covers 118.54 square kilometres (45.77 sq mi) of coastal dunes, containing a lake and areas of mallee scrub. It is commonly called "Tuckamore" by local people. The dunes extend up to 3 km inland and form a habitat for the spinifex hopping mouse. The conservation park has no visitor facilities, although bush camping is permitted.

The dinosaur ant (Nothomyrmecia macrops), noted as a "living fossil", is found within the conservation park. The lake is the largest of several salt lakes in the area - others include Red Lake (a small section of Lake MacDonnell cut off by the Penong to Point Sinclair/Cactus Beach road) and Blue Lake, a smaller lake to the south of Lake MacDonnell.
