= Leslie Newman (disambiguation) =

Leslie Newman is an American screenwriter and author.

Leslie Newman may also refer to:

- Leslie P. Newman (1930–2015), Australian professional ballroom dancer
- Leslie John William Newman (1878–1938), Australian entomologist and horticulturist

== See also ==
- Lesléa Newman (born 1955), American author and editor
