= Penong, South Australia =

Penong
- Town
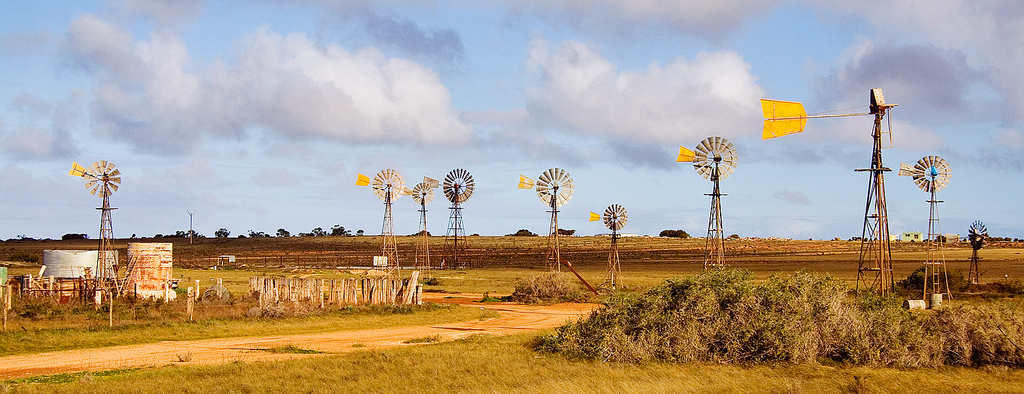
- Windmills adjacent to Penong: each is privately owned and supplies houses and farms with water from the Anjutabie Basin.

- Coordinates: 31°55′47″S 133°00′34″E
- Country: Australia
- State: South Australia
- Region: Eyre Western
- LGA: Pastoral Unincorporated Area
- Location: 616 km (383 mi) NW of Adelaide; 73 km (45 mi) from Ceduna; 543 km (337 mi) from Port Augusta
- Established: 28 April 1892 (town); 8 February 2001 (locality)

Government
  - State electorate: Flinders
  - Federal division: Grey

Population
  - Total: 280 (SAL 2021)
- Time zone: UTC+9:30 (ACST)
  - Summer (DST): UTC+10:30 (ACST)
- Postcode: 5690
- County: Kintore
- Mean max temp: 21.5 °C (70.7 °F)
- Mean min temp: 12.3 °C (54.1 °F)
- Annual rainfall: 300.2 mm (11.82 in)
Localities around Penong
Yellabinna	Yellabinna	Yumbarra
Bookabie	Penong	White Well Corner; Watraba; Uworra
Great Australian Bight	Great Australian Bight	Charra

Penong (/pəˈnɒŋ/ p(ə)-NONG) is a town and locality on the Nullarbor Plain, in the far west of the Australian state of South Australia located about 616 kilometres (383 mi) north-west of the state capital of Adelaide. It is a popular rest-stop for travellers crossing on the Eyre Highway between Ceduna and Western Australia, 400 km (250 mi) away.

The 2016 Australian census recorded that the localities of Penong and the small farming community of Bookabie (including the Scotdesco Aboriginal community), 35 km (22 mi) to Penong's west, had a population of 289 people.

Penong is the closest town to the Chadinga Conservation Park. To its south is Cactus Beach, a popular surfing beach on the western side of Point Sinclair; Port Le Hunte – also known as Port Irvine – is on the sheltered eastern side. The Lake MacDonnell gypsum field – the largest in the Southern Hemisphere – is near the coast 15 km (9 mi) to the south. The major port of Cape Thevenard, collocated with Ceduna, is 75 km (45 mi) to the south-east.

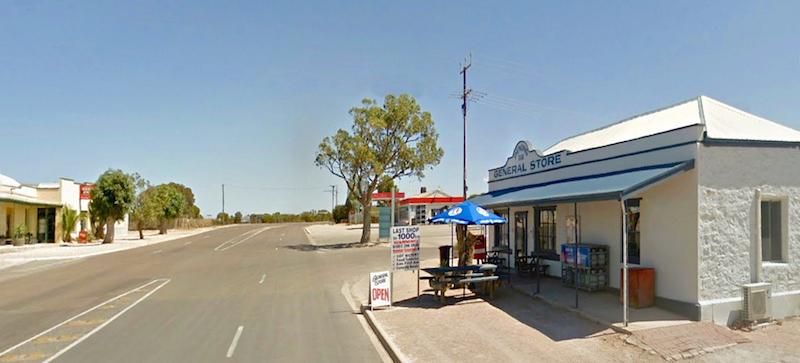
Westward view of the Eyre Highway at Penong SA with general store displaying sign "Last shop for 1000 km"

== History ==
The name Penong is believed to have derived from an Aboriginal name for a rockhole or corruption of an Aboriginal word, poomong, meaning "tea tree".

The area surrounding Penong was settled by pastoralists in the late 19th century. The town was proclaimed on 28 April 1892, when roads were simply rough tracks. There was access to the (small at the time) port at Cape Thevenard, but the all-important railway to send grain and wool cheaply to Port Lincoln, 426 km (265 mi) to the south-east, did not reach the town until 1924. (Note: Penong, Ceduna and Port Lincoln were the only three towns on Eyre Peninsula that existed before the coming of the railway; all the others were established because of it.) Rail services were withdrawn in 1997.

Boundaries for the locality of Penong were created on 8 February 2001 and include the government town of Penong. Additional land including the Chadinga Conservation Park was added on 26 April 2013.

== Agriculture ==
Penong's location on the far west coast of Eyre Peninsula is at the boundary of where rainfall is generally sufficient to support agriculture: the average annual rainfall recorded for nearby Ceduna is only 296.7 mm (11.7 in). Supply of water is therefore crucially important to the community. The town is noted for its privately owned windmills, which supply houses and farms with water from the Anjutabie Basin. The South Australian Railways constructed underground concrete water storage tanks in 1923, with a capacity of 4.54 million litres (1 million gallons), to capture surface water run-off.

== Community ==
The Penong community is active in many activities, such as those of the West Coast Football Club headquartered in Ceduna. Parents of children attending the Penong Primary School raise funds for Relay for Life. In a program to improve public spaces for visiting and local families the Penong Progress Association was successful in 2019 in attracting government funding, through the Outback Communities Authority, to build a shaded shelter and seating for local and visiting families as the third stage of its skate park project. A popular annual event is the Penong Race Club's Far West Farmers Penong Cup horse race meeting in March.

== Governance ==
Penong is located within the federal division of Grey, the state electoral district of Flinders and the Pastoral Unincorporated Area of South Australia. As of 2019, the community within Penong received municipal services from a South Australian government agency, the Outback Communities Authority.

== Politics ==
According to media reports from the time, Penong was the only place in all of Australia where the majority of the population voted "no" in the 1967 referendum on Indigenous rights. According to an article from The Sydney Morning Herald published on 28 May 1967, 210 votes were cast in the town, with 109 (51.94%) being "no" votes. A few days later, The Chronicle reported that 50.69% of the town's voters voted "no", while in nearby Ceduna the "no" vote was also very high at 48.45% out of 809 votes. This was in stark contrast with the nationwide result, with the referendum being overwhelmingly passed with 90.77% of the population voting "yes" and with "yes" majorities in every state, territory and electorate (making it the most successful referendum in Australian history), reflecting the racist attitudes held towards Indigenous Australians by many of the town's residents at the time.

== See also ==
- Point Bell Conservation Park
