= Cactus Beach =

Beach in South Australia

Coordinates: 32°05′11″S 132°58′49″E

Cactus Beach is a beach located 21 km south of Penong in South Australia. It is a renowned surfing location with two left-hand and one right-hand surfing breaks.
