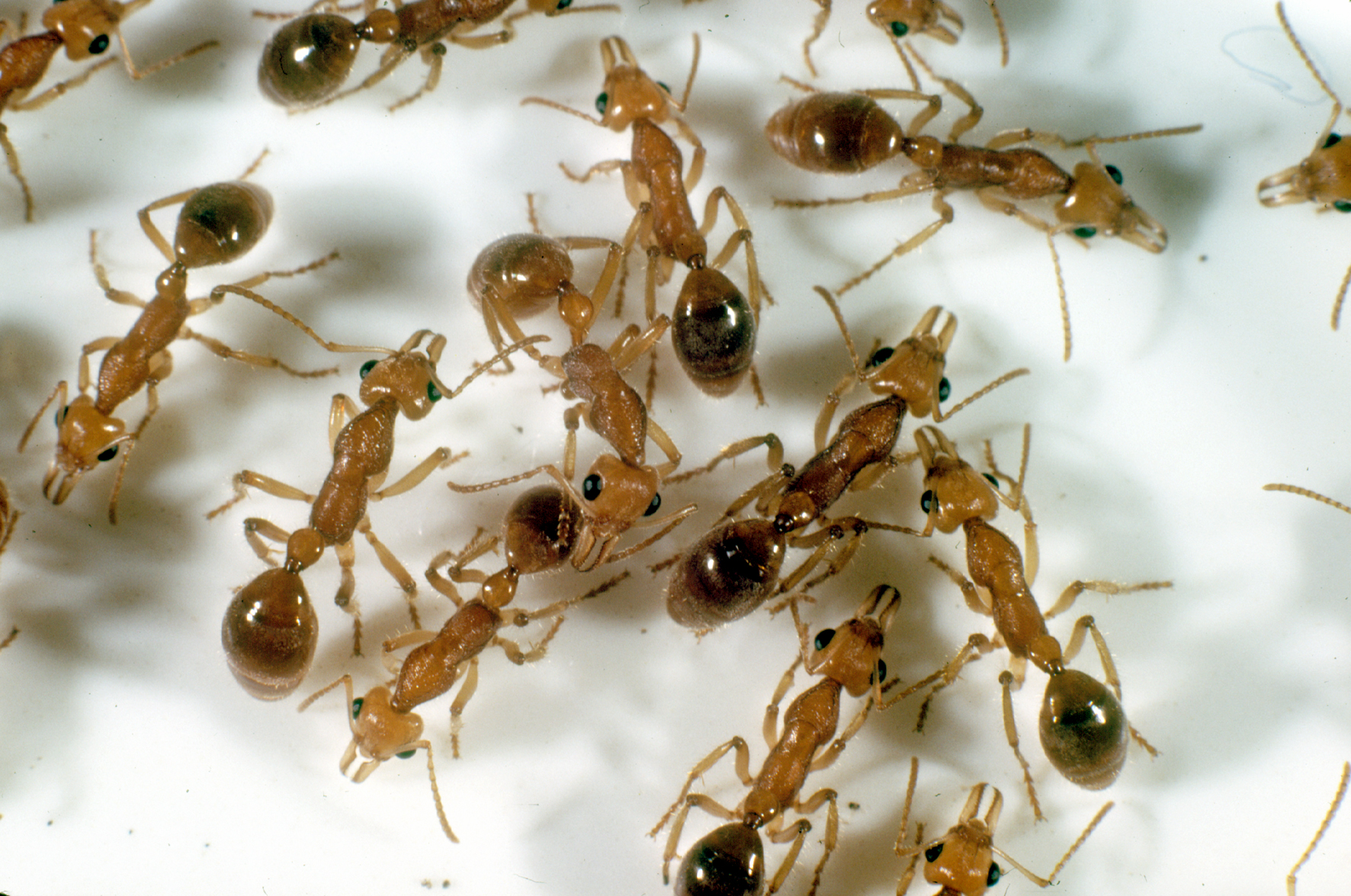
- N. macrops workers

Conservation status
- Critically Endangered (IUCN 2.3)

Scientific classification
- Kingdom: Animalia
- Phylum: Arthropoda
- Clade: Pancrustacea
- Class: Insecta
- Order: Hymenoptera
- Family: Formicidae
- Subfamily: Myrmeciinae
- Tribe: Prionomyrmecini
- Genus: Nothomyrmecia; Clark, 1934
- Species: N. macrops

Binomial name
- Nothomyrmecia macrops Clark, 1934

= Nothomyrmecia =

Genus of ants

Nothomyrmecia, also known as the dinosaur ant or dawn ant, is an extremely rare genus of ants consisting of a single species, Nothomyrmecia macrops. These ants live in South Australia, nesting in old-growth mallee woodland and Eucalyptus woodland. The full distribution of Nothomyrmecia has never been assessed, and it is unknown how widespread the species truly is; its potential range may be wider if it does favour old-growth mallee woodland. Possible threats to its survival include habitat destruction and climate change. Nothomyrmecia is most active when it is cold because workers encounter fewer competitors and predators such as Camponotus and Iridomyrmex, and it also increases hunting success. Thus, the increase of temperature may prevent them from foraging and very few areas would be suitable for the ant to live in. As a result, the IUCN lists the ant as Critically Endangered.

As a medium-sized ant, Nothomyrmecia measures 9.7–11 mm (0.38–0.43 in). Workers are monomorphic, showing little morphological differentiation among one another. Mature colonies are very small, with only 50 to 100 individuals in each nest. Workers are strictly nocturnal and are solitary foragers, collecting arthropod prey and sweet substances such as honeydew from scale insects and other Hemiptera. They rely on their vision to navigate and there is no evidence to suggest that the species use chemicals to communicate when foraging, but they do use chemical alarm signals. A queen ant will mate with one or more males and, during colony foundation, she will hunt for food until the brood have fully developed. Queens are univoltine (they produce just one generation of ants each year). Two queens may establish a colony together, but only one will remain once the first generation of workers has been reared.

Nothomyrmecia was first described by Australian entomologist John S. Clark in 1934 from two specimens of worker ants. These were reportedly collected in 1931 near the Russell Range, inland from Israelite Bay in Western Australia. After its initial discovery, the ant was not seen again for four decades until a group of entomologists rediscovered it in 1977, 1,300 km (810 mi) away from the original reported site. Dubbed as the 'Holy Grail' of myrmecology, the ant was subject to great scientific interest after its rediscovery, attracting scientists from around the world. In Poochera (the rediscovery site), pictures of the ant are stencilled on the streets, and it is perhaps the only town in the world that thrives off ant-based tourism. Some entomologists have suggested a relationship to the Baltic Eocene fossil ant genus Prionomyrmex based on morphological similarities, but this interpretation is not widely accepted by the entomological community. Owing to its body structure, Nothomyrmecia is regarded to be the most plesiomorphic ant alive and a 'living fossil', stimulating studies on its morphology, behaviour, ecology, and chromosomes.

== Description ==
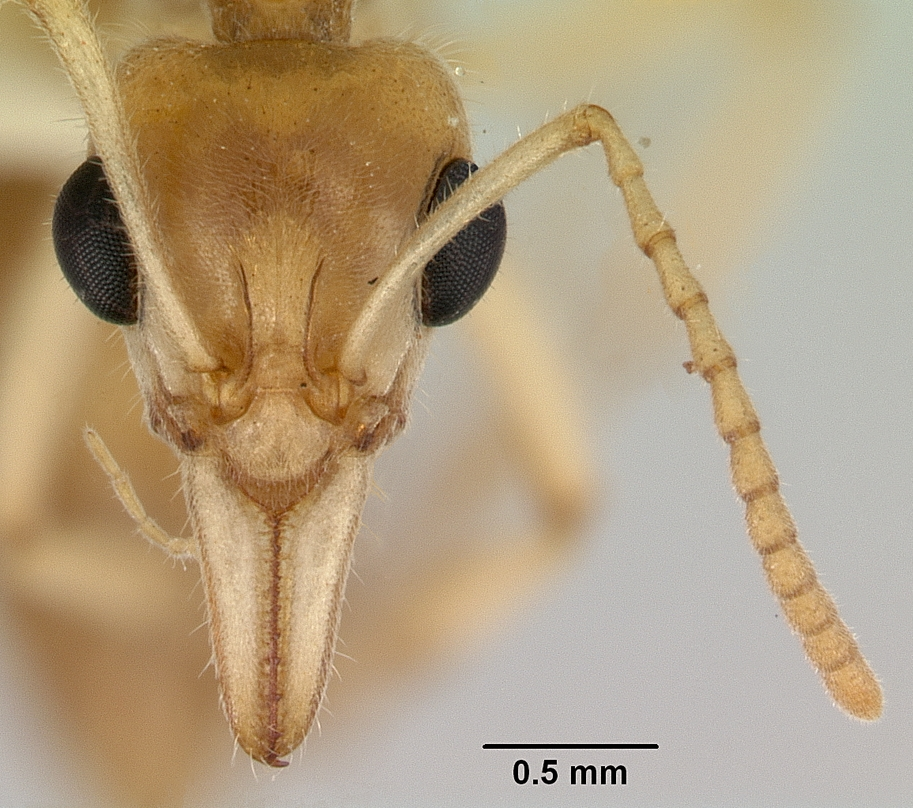
Closeup view of a worker's head

Nothomyrmecia is a medium-sized ant measuring 9.7–11 mm (0.38–0.43 in) in length. Workers are monomorphic, meaning that there is little morphological differentiation among one another. The mandibles, clypeus (one of the sclerites that make up the "face" of an arthropod or insect), antennae and legs are pale yellow. The hairs on the body are yellow, erect and long and abundant, but on the antennae and legs they are shorter and suberect (standing almost in an erect position). It shows similar characteristics to Myrmecia, and somewhat resembles Oecophylla, commonly known as weaver ants. Workers are strictly nocturnal (active mainly at night) but navigate by vision, relying on large compound eyes. The mandibles are shorter than the head. They have 10 to 15 intermeshing teeth and are less specialised than those of Myrmecia and Prionomyrmex, being elongate and triangular. The head is longer than it is wide and broader towards the back. The sides of the head are convex around the eyes. The long antennal scapes (the base of the antenna) extend beyond the occipital border, and the second segment of the funiculus (a series of segments between the base and club) is slightly longer than the first, third and fourth segment. The node, pronotum, epinotum and thorax are longer than broad, and the mesonotum is just as long as it is wide. The first segment of the gaster (the bulbous posterior portion of the metasoma) is broader than long by a third and broader at the back than the front with strongly convex sides.

A long and retractable stinger is present at the rear of the abdomen. It has been described as "prominent and effective" and is capable of inflicting a painful sting to humans. A 'sting bulb gland' is also present in Nothomyrmecia; this is a small exocrine gland of unknown function, first discovered and named in 1990. It is situated in the basal part of the insect's sting, and is located between the two ducts of the venom gland and the Dufour's gland. Despite its many plesiomorphic features, the sting apparatus of Nothomyrmecia is considered less primitive than those found in other ants such as Stigmatomma pallipes. It is the only known species of ant that contains both a sting and a 'waist' (i.e. it has no postpetiole between the first and second gastral segments).

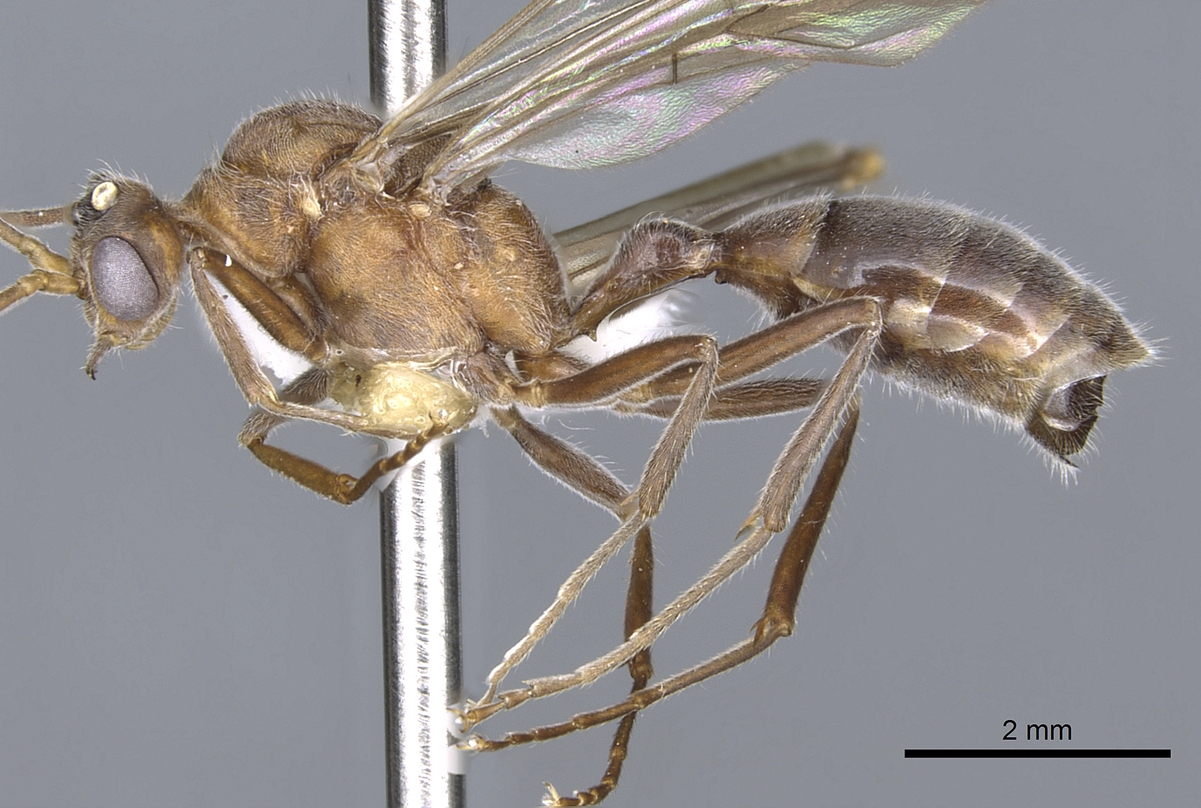
N. macrops, winged male

Queens look similar to workers, but several morphological features distinguish the two castes from each other. The queen's body is usually larger. Ocelli are highly developed, but the eyes on the queen are not enlarged. The structure of the pterothorax (the wing-bearing area of the thorax) is consistent with other reproductive ants, but it does not occupy as much of its mesosomal bulk. The wings of the queens are rudimentary and stubby, barely overlapping the first gastral segment, and are brachypterous (non-functional). Males resemble those of Myrmecia, but Nothomyrmecia males bear a single waist node. The wings on the male ant are not stubby like a queen's; rather they are long and fully developed, exhibiting a primitive venational complement. They have a jugal anal lobe (a portion of the hindwing), a feature found in many primitive ants, and basal hamuli (hook-like projections that link the forewings and hindwings). Most male specimens collected have two tibial spurs (spines located on the distal end of the tibia); the first spur is a long calcar and the second spur is short and thick. Adults have a stridulatory organ on the ventral side of the abdomen – unlike all other hymenopterans in which such organs are located dorsally.

In all castes, these ants have six maxillary palps (palps that serve as organs of touch and taste in feeding) and four labial palps (sensory structures on the labium), a highly primitive feature. The females have a 12-segmented antenna, whereas males have 13 segments. Other features include paired calcariae found on both the hind and middle tibiae, and the claws have a median tooth. The unspecialised nature of the cuticle (outer exoskeleton of the body) is similar to Pseudomyrmex, a member of the subfamily Pseudomyrmecinae. Many of the features known in Nothomyrmecia are found in Ponerinae and Pseudomyrmecinae.

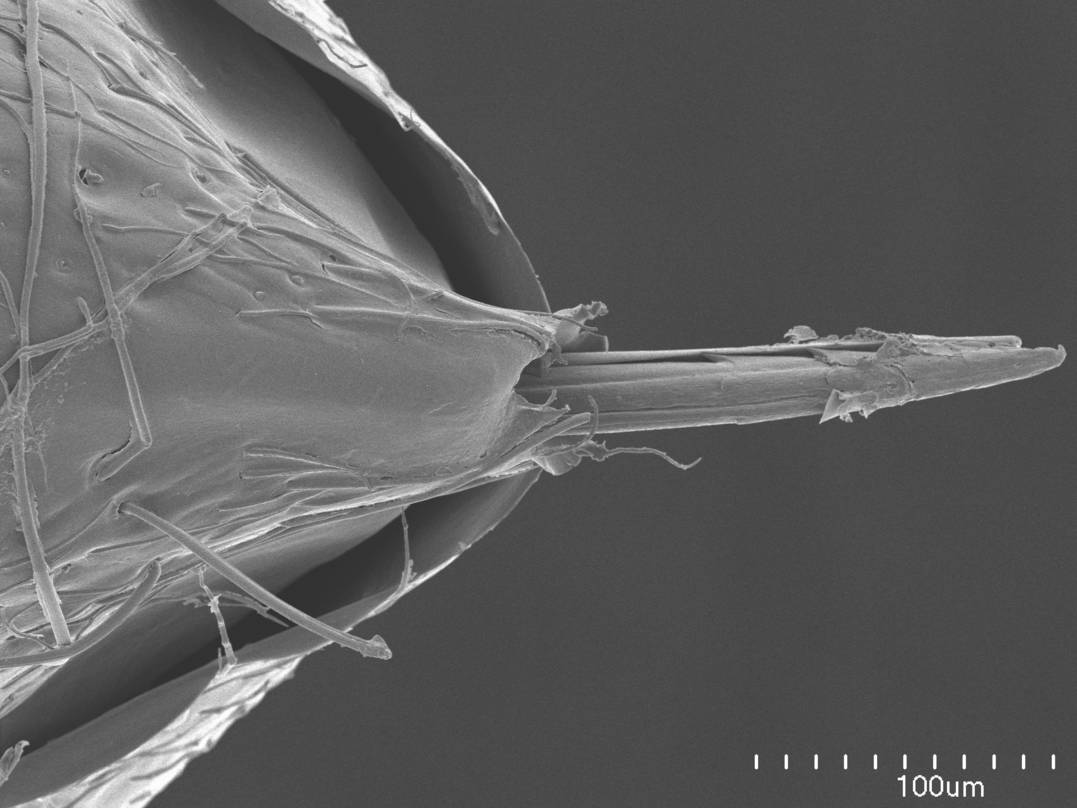
Stinger of N. macrops

The eggs of Nothomyrmecia are similar to those of Myrmecia, being subspherical and non-adhesive. The larvae bear a primitive body structure with no specialised tubercles, sharing similar characteristics with the subfamily Ponerinae, but the sensilla are more abundant on the mouthparts. The larvae are characterised into three stages: very young, young, and mature, measuring 2.8 mm (0.1 in), 6.3 mm (0.2 in) and 11 mm (0.4 in), respectively. The cocoons have thin walls and produce meconium (a metabolic waste product expelled through the anal opening after an insect emerges from its pupal stage). The cuticular hydrocarbons have internally branched alkenes, a feature rarely found in ants and most insects.

In general, the body structure of all Nothomyrmecia castes demonstrates the primitive nature of the species. Notable derived features include vestigial ocelli on workers, brachypterous queens, and the mesoscutal structure on males. The morphology of the abdomen, mandibles, gonoforceps (a sclerite, serving as the base of the ovipositors sheath) and basal hamuli show it is more primitive than Myrmecia. The structure of the abdominal region can separate it from other Myrmeciinae relatives (the fourth abdominal segment of Myrmecia is tubulate, whereas Nothomyrmecia has a non-tubulated abdominal segment). The appearance of the fourth abdominal segment is consistent with almost all aculeate insects, and possibly Sphecomyrma.

The feature of non-functional, vestigial wings may have evolved in this species relatively recently, as wings might otherwise have long-since disappeared completely had they no function for dispersal. Wing-reduction could somehow relate to population structure or some other specialised ecological pressure. Equally, wing-reduction might be a feature that only forms in drought-stressed colonies, as has been observed in several Monomorium ant species found throughout semi-arid regions of Australia. As yet, scientists do not fully understand how the feature of non-functional, vestigial wings arose in Nothomyrmecia macrops.

== Taxonomy ==
=== Discovery ===
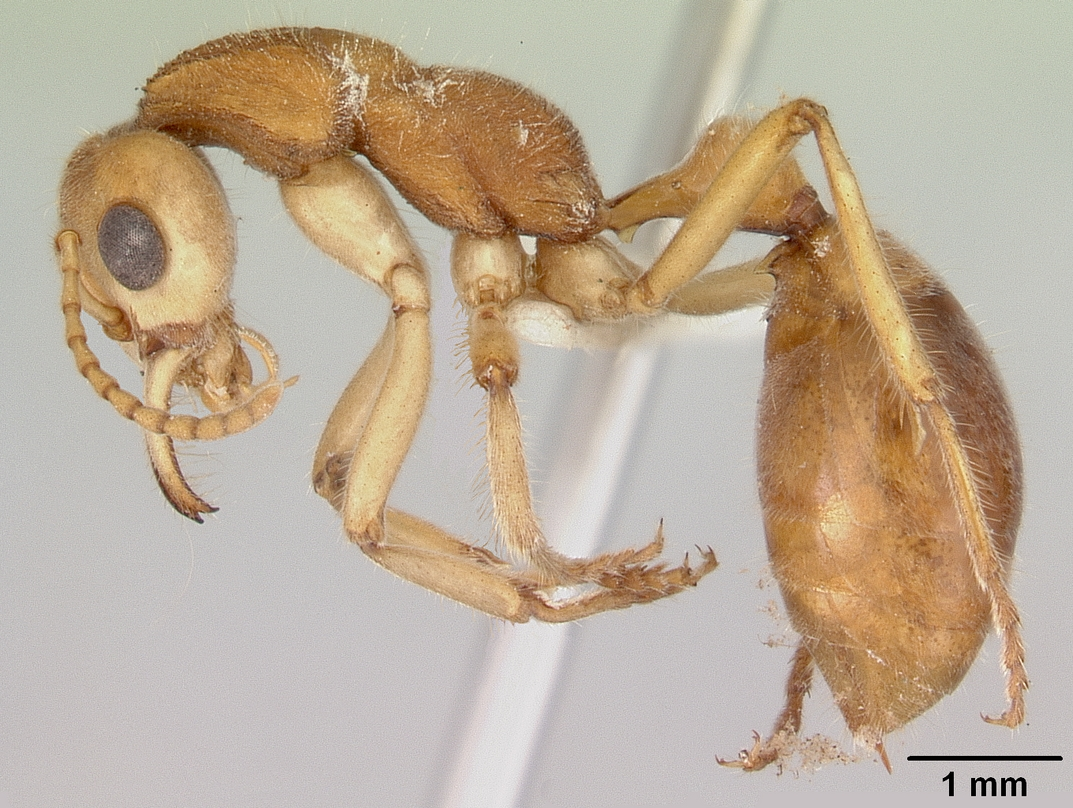
N. macrops worker specimen collected by Taylor

The first collection of Nothomyrmecia was made in December 1931 by amateur entomologist, Amy Crocker, (Note: Referred to as Miss. A. E. Baesjou in Clark's article.) whose colleagues had collected a range of insect samples for her during a field excursion, including specimens of two worker ants, reportedly near the Russell Range, inland from Israelite Bay in Western Australia. Crocker then passed the ants to Australian entomologist John S. Clark. Recognised shortly afterwards as a new species, these specimens became the syntypes. Entomologist Robert W. Taylor subsequently expressed doubt about the accuracy of recording of the original discovery site, stating the specimens were probably collected from the western end of the Great Australian Bight, south from Balladonia. The discovery of Nothomyrmecia and the appearance of its unique body structure led scientists in 1951 to initiate a series of searches to find the ant in Western Australia. Over three decades, teams of Australian and American collectors failed to re-find it; entomologists such as E. O. Wilson and William Brown, Jr., made attempts to search for it, but neither was successful. Then, on 22 October 1977, Taylor and his party of entomologists from Canberra serendipitously discovered a solitary worker ant at Poochera, South Australia, southeast of Ceduna, some 1,300 km (810 mi) from the reported site of the 1931 discovery. In 2012, a report discussing the possible presence of Nothomyrmecia in Western Australia did not confirm any sighting of the ant between Balladonia and the Western Australian coastal regions. After 46 years of searching for it, entomologists have dubbed the ant the 'Holy Grail' of myrmecology.

=== Naming ===
In 1934 entomologist John S. Clark published a formal description of Nothomyrmecia macrops as a new species and within a completely new genus and tribe (Nothomyrmecii) of the Ponerinae. He did so because the two specimens (which then became the syntypes) bore no resemblance to any ant species he knew of, but they did share similar morphological characteristics with the extinct genus Prionomyrmex. Clark notes that the head and mandibles of Nothomyrmecia and Prionomyrmex are somewhat similar, but the two can be distinguished by the appearance of the node (a segment between the mesosoma and gaster). In 1951, Clark proposed the new ant subfamily Nothomyrmeciinae for his Nothomyrmecia, based on morphological differences with other ponerine ants. This proposal was rejected by American entomologist William Brown Jr., who placed it in the subfamily Myrmeciinae with Myrmecia and Prionomyrmex, under the tribe Nothomyrmeciini. Its distant relationship with extant ants was confirmed after its rediscovery, and its placement within the Formicidae was accepted by most scientists until the late 1980s. The single waist node led scientists to believe that Nothomyrmecia should be separate from Myrmecia and retained Clark's original proposal. This proposal would place the ant into its own subfamily, despite many familiar morphological characteristics between the two genera. This separation from Myrmecia was retained until 2000.

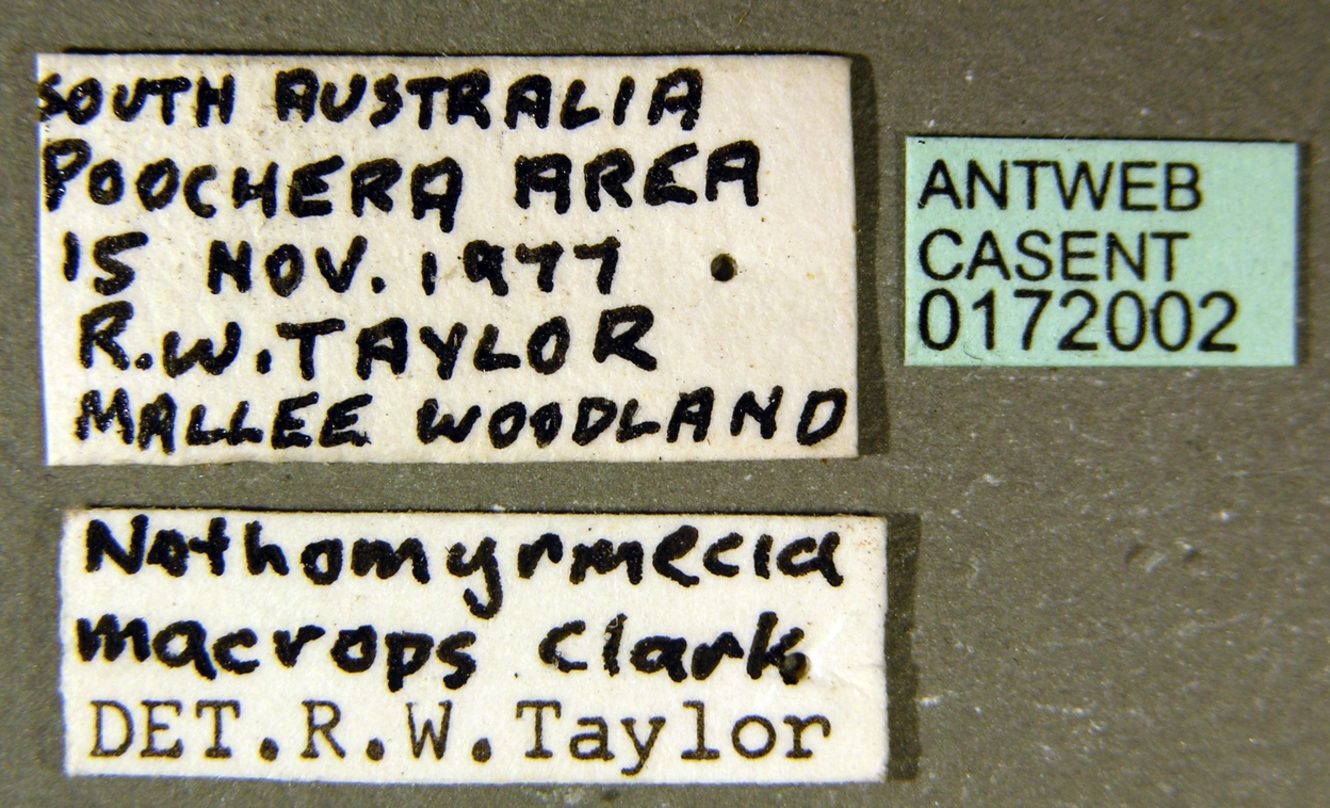
Label of one of the Nothomyrmecia specimens collected by Taylor

In 2000, entomologist Cesare Baroni Urbani described a new Baltic fossil Prionomyrmex species (P. janzeni). After examining specimens of Nothomyrmecia, Baroni Urbani stated that his new species and N. macrops were so morphologically similar that they belonged to the same genus. He proposed that the name Prionomyrmex should replace the name Nothomyrmecia (which would then be just a synonym), and also that the subfamily Nothomyrmeciinae should be called Prionomyrmeciinae.

In 2003, Russian palaeoentomologists G. M. Dlussky and E. B. Perfilieva separated Nothomyrmecia from Prionomyrmex on the basis of the fusion of an abdominal segment. In the same year, American entomologists P. S. Ward and S. G. Brady reached the same conclusion as Dlussky and Perfilieva and provided strong support for the monophyly of Prionomyrmex. Ward and Brady also transferred both taxa as distinct genera in the older subfamily Myrmeciinae under the tribe Prionomyrmecini. In 2005 and 2008, Baroni Urbani suggested further evidence in favour of his former interpretation as opposed to Ward and Brady's. This view is not supported in subsequent relevant papers, which continue to use the classification of Ward and Brady, rejecting that of Baroni Urbani.

The ant is commonly known as the dinosaur ant, dawn ant, or living fossil ant because of its plesiomorphic body structure. The generic name Nothomyrmecia means "false bulldog ant". Its specific epithet, macrops ("big eyes"), is derived from the Greek words makros, meaning "long", or "large", and ops, meaning "eyes".

=== Genetics and phylogeny ===
Studies show that all hymenopteran insects that have a diploid (2n) chromosome count above 52 are themselves all ants; Nothomyrmecia and another Ponerinae ant, Platythyrea tricuspidata, share the highest number of chromosomes within all the Hymenoptera, having a diploid chromosome number of 92–94.

Genetic evidence suggests that the age of the most recent common ancestor for Nothomyrmecia and Myrmecia is approximately 74 million years old, giving a likely origin in the Cretaceous. There are two hypotheses of the internal phylogeny of Nothomyrmecia: subfamily Formicinae is more closely related to Nothomyrmecia than it is to Myrmecia, evolving from Nothomyrmecia-like ancestors. Alternatively, Nothomyrmecia and Aneuretinae may have shared a common ancestor; the two most likely separated from each other, and the first formicines evolved from the Aneuretinae instead. Currently, scientists agree that Nothomyrmecia most likely evolved from ancestors to the Ponerinae. Nothomyrmecia and other primitive ant genera such as Amblyopone and Myrmecia exhibit behaviour similar to a clade of soil-dwelling families of vespoid wasps. The following cladogram generated by Canadian entomologist S. B. Archibald and his colleagues shows the possible phylogenetic position of Nothomyrmecia among some ants of the subfamily Myrmeciinae. They suggest that Nothomyrmecia may be closely related to extinct Myrmeciinae ants such as Avitomyrmex, Macabeemyrma, Prionomyrmex, and Ypresiomyrma.

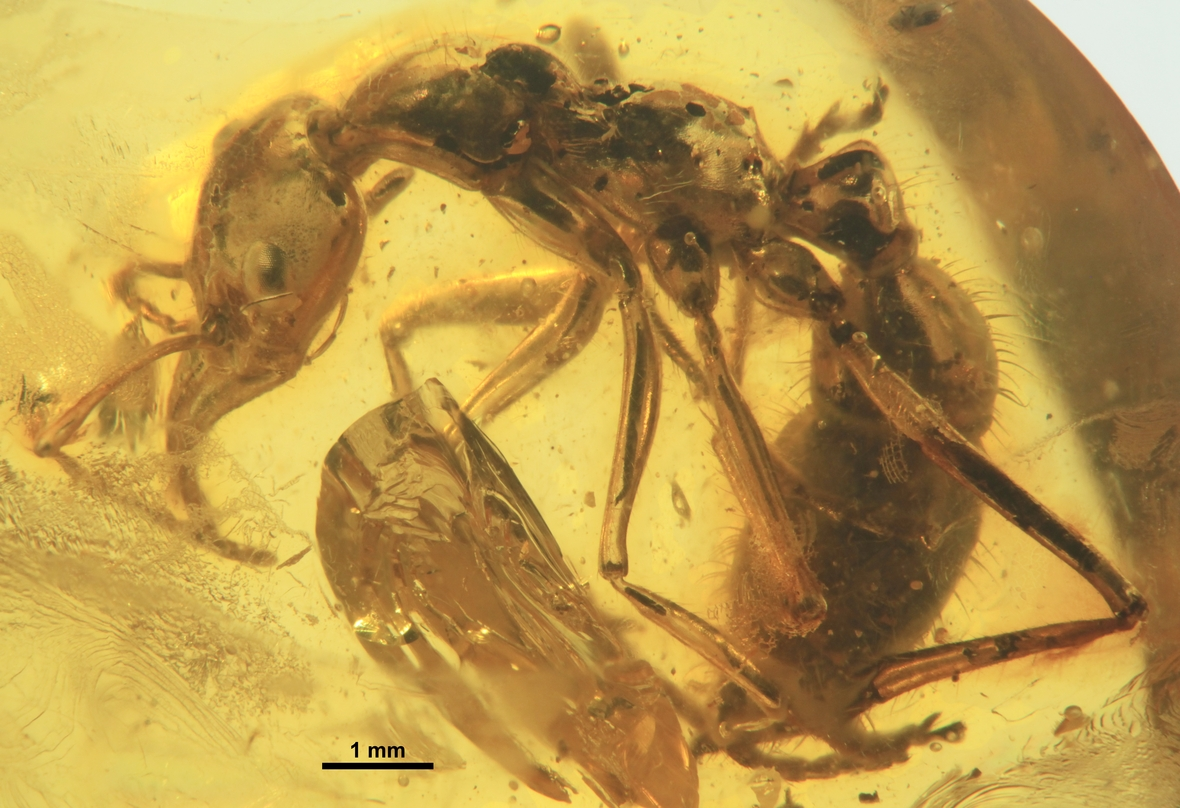
Nothomyrmecia and the extinct Prionomyrmex are closely related to each other

- Myrmeciinae
  - †Archimyrmex
  - Myrmecia
  - - - †Prionomyrmex janzeni
      - †Prionomyrmex longiceps
    - - †Macabeemyrma
      - †Avitomyrmex
      - †Ypresiomyrma
      - Nothomyrmecia

== Distribution and habitat ==
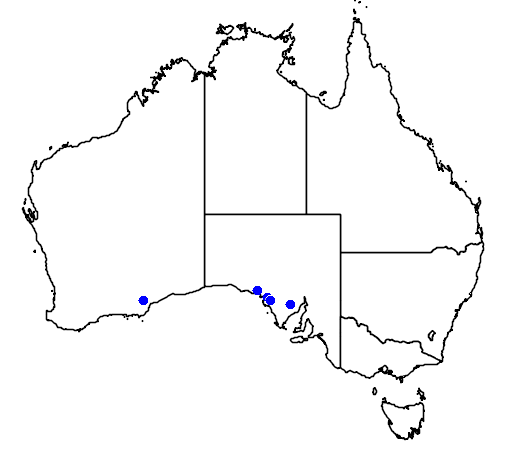
Reported occurrences of Nothomyrmecia according to the Atlas of Living Australia

Nothomyrmecia is present in the cool regions of South Australia within mallee woodland and especially old-growth areas populated with various Eucalyptus species, including Eucalyptus brachycalyx, E. gracilis and E. oleosa. It is possible that it also occurs in Western Australia, from where it was first collected. The full distribution of Nothomyrmecia has never been assessed, and it is unknown how widespread it really is. If it does favour old-growth mallee woodland, it could have the potential for a wider range than is currently known from surveys and museum specimens. In 1998, Nothomyrmecia colonies were located in 18 areas along the Eyre Peninsula by a team of entomologists, a stretch of 400 km (250 mi).

Nests are found in degraded limestone soil with Callitris trees present. Colony construction only occurs when the soil is moist. Nest entrance holes are difficult to detect as they are only 4–6 mm (0.16–0.24 in) in width, and are located under shallow leaf litter with no mounds or soil deposits present; guards are regularly seen. A single gallery, 4–5 mm (0.16–0.20 in) in diameter, forms inside a Nothomyrmecia colony. This gallery descends steeply into the ground towards a somewhat elliptical and horizontal chamber that is 3–5 cm (1.2–2.0 in) in diameter and 5–10 mm (0.20–0.39 in) in height. This chamber is typically 18 to 43 cm (7.1 to 16.9 in) below the soil's surface.

== Behaviour and ecology ==
=== Foraging, diet and predators ===
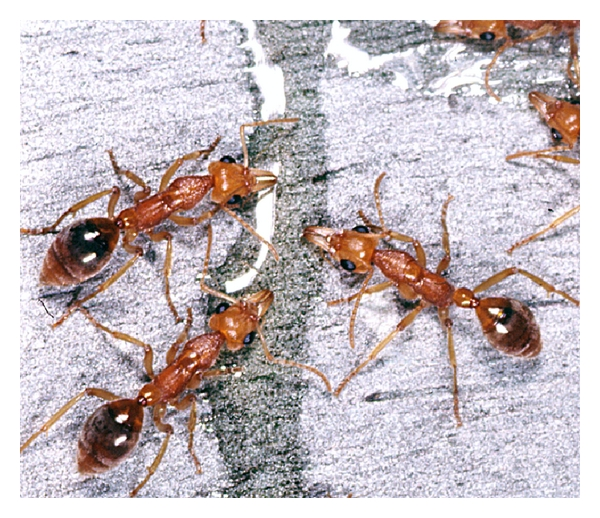
Workers feeding on honey bait

Workers are nectarivores and can be found foraging on top of Eucalyptus trees, where they search for food and prey for the larvae. Workers are known to consume hemolymph from the insects they capture, and a queen in a captive colony was observed consuming a fly. Captured prey items are given to larvae, which are carnivorous. The workers search for prey in piles of leaves, killing small arthropods including Drosophila flies, microlepidopterans and spiderlings. Prey items are usually less than 4 mm (0.2 in) in size, and workers grab them using their mandibles and forelegs, then kill them with their sting. Workers also feed on sweet substances such as honeydew secreted by scale insects and other Hemiptera; one worker alone may feed on these sources for 30 minutes. Pupae may be given to the larvae if a colony has a shortage of food. Workers are able to lay unfertilised eggs specifically to feed the larvae; these are known as trophic eggs. Sometimes the adults, including the queen and other sexually active ants, consume these eggs. Workers transfer food via trophallaxis to other nestmates, including winged adults and larvae; the anal droplets are exuded by the larvae, which are taken up by the workers.

Age caste polyethism does not occur in Nothomyrmecia, where the younger workers act as nurses and tend to the brood and the older workers go out and forage. The only ant known other than Nothomyrmecia which does not exhibit age caste polyethism is Stigmatomma pallipes. Workers are strictly nocturnal, and only emerge from their nests on cold nights. They are most active at temperatures of 5–10 °C (41–50 °F), and are much more difficult to locate on warmer nights. Workers are possibly most active when it is cold because at these times they encounter fewer and less aggressive competitors, including other more dominant diurnal ant species that are sometimes found foraging during warm nights. Cold temperatures may also hamper the escape of prey items, so increasing the ants' hunting success. Unless a forager has captured prey, workers stay on trees for the remainder of the night until dawn, possibly relying on sunlight to navigate back to their nest. There is no evidence that they use chemical trails when foraging; instead, workers rely on visual cues to navigate around. Chemical markers may play an important role in recognising nest entrances. The ants are solitary foragers. Waste material, such as dead nestmates, cocoon shells, and food remnants, are disposed of far away from the nest.

Workers from different Nothomyrmecia colonies are not antagonistic towards one another, so they can forage together on a single tree, and they attack if an outsider tries to enter an underground colony. Ants such as Camponotus and Iridomyrmex may pose a threat to foragers or to a colony if they try to enter; foraging workers that encounter Iridomyrmex ants are vigorously attacked and killed. Nothomyrmecia workers counter this by secreting alarm pheromones from the mandibular gland and Dufour's gland. Foraging workers also engage in alternative methods to protect themselves from predators. Adopting a posture by opening the jaws in a threatening stance or deliberately falling onto the ground and remaining motionless until the threat subsides are two known methods. With that said, Nothomyrmecia is a timid and shy species that retreats if exposed.

=== Life cycle and reproduction ===
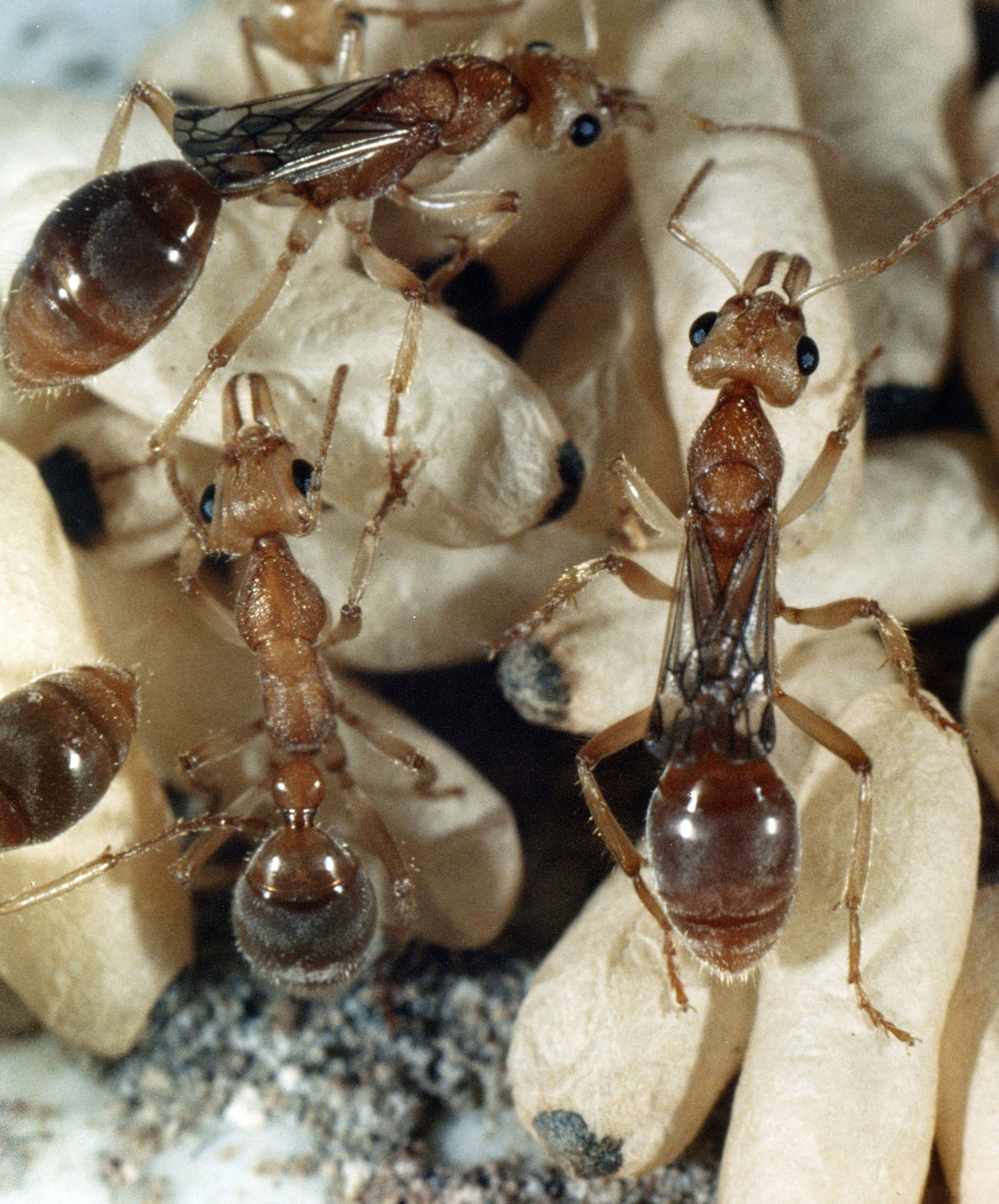
Two queens showing their vestigial wings, as well as a wingless worker and several cocoons

Nuptial flight (meaning that virgin queens and males emerge to mate) does not occur in Nothomyrmecia. Instead, they engage in long-range dispersal (they walk away from the colony for some distance and mate) which presumably begins by late summer or autumn, with the winged adults emerging around March and April, but sometimes a colony may overwinter (a process by which an organism waits out the winter season). These winged adults, born around January, are usually quite young when they begin to mate. Queens are seen around vegetation trying to flutter their vestigial wings – a behaviour seen in some brachypterous Myrmecia queens. Due to the queen's brachypterous wings, it is likely that the winged adults mate near their parent nest and release sex pheromones, or instead climb on vegetation far away from their nests and attract fully winged males. Nothomyrmecia is a polyandrous ant, in which queens mate with one or more males. In one study of 32 colonies, it was found that queens mated with an average of 1.37 males. After mating, new colonies can be founded by one or more queens; a colony with two queens reduces to a single queen when the nest is mature, forming colonies that are termed monogynous. The queens will compete for dominance, and the subordinate queen is later expelled by workers who drag her outside the nest. An existing nest with no queen may adopt a foraging queen looking for an area to begin her colony, as well as workers. Queens are semi-claustral, meaning that during the initial establishment of the new colony the queen will forage among the worker ants so that she can ensure sufficient food to raise her brood. Sometimes a queen will leave her nest at night with the sole purpose of finding food or water for herself.

Eggs are not seen in nests from April to September. They are laid by late December and develop into adults by mid-February; pupation does not occur until March. Nothomyrmecia is univoltine, meaning that the queen produces a single generation of eggs per season, and it sometimes may take as many as 12 months for an egg to develop into an adult. Adults are defined as either juveniles or post-juveniles: juveniles are too young (perhaps several months old) to have experienced overwintering whereas post-juveniles have. The pupae generally overwinter and begin to hatch by the time a new generation of eggs is laid. Workers are capable of laying reproductive eggs; it is not known if these develop into males, females or both. This uncertainty results from the suggestion that, because some colonies have been shown to have high levels of genetic diversity, worker ants could be inseminated by males and act as supplementary reproductives. Eggs are scattered among the nest, whereas the larvae and pupae are set apart from each other in groups. The larvae are capable of crawling around the nest. When the larvae are ready to spin their cocoons, they swell up and are later buried by workers in the ground to allow cocoon formation. Small non-aggressive workers that act as nurses provide assistance for newborns to hatch from their cocoons. At maturity, a nest may only contain 50 to 100 adults. In some nests, colony founding can occur within a colony itself: when a queen dies, the colony may be taken over by one of her daughters, or it may adopt a newly mated queen, restricting reproduction among workers; this method of founding extends the lifespan of the colony almost indefinitely.

== Relationship with humans ==
=== Conservation ===
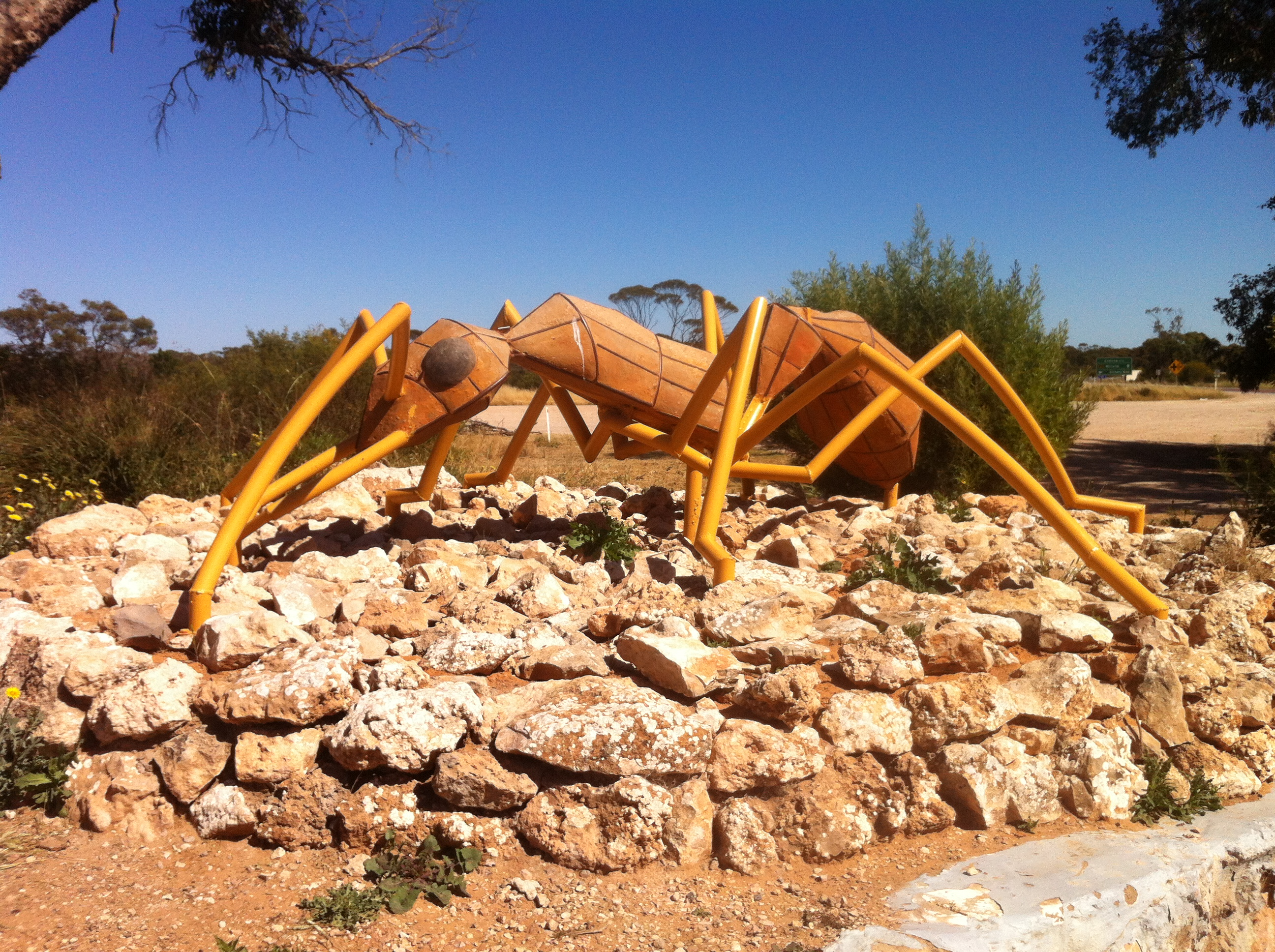
Sculpture of a Nothomyrmecia ant in Poochera

Before its rediscovery in 1977, entomologists feared that Nothomyrmecia had already become extinct. The ant was listed as a protected species under the Western Australian Wildlife Conservation Act 1950. In 1996, the International Union for Conservation of Nature listed Nothomyrmecia as Critically Endangered, stating that only a few small colonies were known. The Threatened Species Scientific Committee states that the species is ineligible for listing under the Environment Protection and Biodiversity Conservation Act 1999. This is because there is insufficient evidence to demonstrate that populations are declining. Colonies are also naturally depauperate (lacking in numbers of ants), and their distribution is potentially quite extensive across southern Australia, due to the ants' preference for old-growth mallee woodland. With 18 sites known for this species, and the potential for many more being discovered, there seems little immediate possibility of extinction. With this said, it is unknown how widespread the species actually is, and scientists are not yet clear what, if any, threats affect it.

Suspected anthropogenic threats that can significantly affect Nothomyrmecia include habitat destruction and fragmentation by railway lines, roads and wheat fields. In the town of Ceduna, west of Poochera, local populations of the ant were almost eliminated after the area was bulldozed and burned during the installation of an underground telephone line, although nearby sites had larger populations than those found in the destroyed site. Colonies may not survive tree-clearing, as they depend on overhead canopies to navigate. Bushfires are another major threat to the survival of Nothomyrmecia, potentially destroying valuable food sources, including the trees they forage on, and reducing the population of a colony. These ants may have recovered from previous bushfires, but larger, more frequent fires may devastate the population. Nothomyrmecia ants can be safe from fires if they remain inside their nests. Climate change could be a threat to their survival, as they depend on cold temperatures to forage and collect food. An increase in the temperature will prevent workers from foraging, and very few areas would be suitable for the species to live in. The cold winds blowing off the Southern Ocean allow Nothomyrmecia to benefit from the cool temperatures they need for night-time foraging, so an increase in sea temperature could also potentially threaten it.

Conservationists suggest that conducting surveys, maintaining known populations through habitat protection and fighting climate change may ensure the survival of Nothomyrmecia. They also advocate protection of remaining mallee habitat from degradation, and for management actions to improve tree and understorey structure. Because most known populations are found outside protected areas in vegetation alongside roads, a species management plan is required to identify other key actions, including making local councils aware of the presence, conservation status and habitat requirement of Nothomyrmecia. This could result in future land use and management being decided more appropriately at the local level. Not all colonies are found in unprotected areas; some have been discovered in the Lake Gilles Conservation Park and the Chadinga Conservation Reserve. More research is needed to know the true extent of the ant's geographical distribution.

=== Significance ===
Nothomyrmecia macrops is widely regarded as the most plesiomorphic living ant and, as such, has aroused considerable interest among the entomological community. Following its rediscovery it was the subject of a prolonged and rigorous series of studies involving Australian, American and European ant specialists and it soon became one of the most studied ant species on the planet. Nothomyrmecia can be cultured with ease, and could potentially prove a useful subject for research into learning in insects as well as the physiology of nocturnal vision. Since its chance discovery at Poochera, the town has become of international interest to myrmecologists, and it is possibly the only town in the world with ant-based tourism. Promoting it as a tourist attraction, Nothomyrmecia has been adopted as the emblem of the Poochera community. Pictures of the ant have been stencilled onto the pavements, and a large sculpture of Nothomyrmecia has been erected in the town.
