= Point Bell Conservation Park =

Protected area in South Australia

- IUCN category III (natural monument or feature)
- Location within South Australia
- Location: South Australia, Penong
- Nearest city: Ceduna
- Coordinates: 32.1904°S 133.1378°E
- Area: 5.46 km^{2} (2.11 sq mi)
- Established: 11 November 1993
- Governing body: Department for Environment and Water

Point Bell Conservation Park is a protected area in the Australian state of South Australia. Located in the gazetted locality of Penong, it is in the west of the state on the coastline of the Great Australian Bight, on land including and adjoining the headland of Point Bell. It is about 52 kilometres (32 miles) west of the town of Ceduna.

The land first acquired protected area status on 11 November 1993 as a conservation reserve dedicated under the Crown Lands Act 1929 and known as the Point Bell Conservation Reserve. In 2005 the conservation reserve was resumed, and in 2006 the land was constituted as the Point Bell Conservation Park.

In 2007, the conservation park was described by its managing authority as follows:

This small rocky point with granite boulders contains long, sandy beaches and sand dunes. It provides excellent fishing, camping and swimming opportunities.

A co-management agreement signed by the Far West Coast Aboriginal Corporation and the Government of South Australia in 2013 in respect to the Yumbarra Conservation Park also provides for the corporation to give advice on the management of the conservation park and other reserves in the west of the state. The conservation park is one of those in the west of the state where Aboriginal people are permitted to hunt for and gather food.

The conservation park is classified as an IUCN Category III protected area.
