= Dolichoderus clarki =

Scientific classification
- Kingdom: Animalia
- Phylum: Arthropoda
- Class: Insecta
- Order: Hymenoptera
- Family: Formicidae
- Subfamily: Dolichoderinae
- Genus: Dolichoderus
- Species: D. clarki

Binomial name
- Dolichoderus clarki Wheeler, W.M., 1935

Synonyms
- Dolichoderus tristis Clark, 1930

Species of ant

Dolichoderus clarki is a species of ant in the genus Dolichoderus. Described by William Morton Wheeler in 1935, the species is found in wet sclerophyll areas of the central coast of New South Wales and the Australian Capital Territory. Workers of this species are known to forage on ground and on low vegetation.
