= Lake MacDonnell =

Gypsum-mining lake in South Australia

- Location in South Australia
- Location: Eyre Peninsula, near Penong, South Australia
- Coordinates: 32°02′34″S 133°00′04″E

Lake MacDonnell is a salt lake on western Eyre Peninsula near the Nullarbor Plain. The closest town is Penong, 13 kilometres (8 miles) to the north. It is the site of a former salt mine, now the largest gypsum mine in Australia on the largest gypsum deposit in the southern hemisphere. Salt is still mined but as a secondary product.

== Ore body ==
The ore body consists of calcrete coastal dunes of the Pleistocene Bridgewater Formation in a 20-kilometre (12 mi) northwest-trending depression. The gypsum formed during the Holocene period.

The gypsum deposit has a one-metre layer of gypsarenite containing 93 percent gypsum (calcium sulphate). Below that is a 5-metre (16 ft) layer of selenite containing 94-96% calcium sulphate. The deposit may contain as much as 500-700 million tonnes over an area of 87 square kilometres (34 sq mi).

== Mine ==
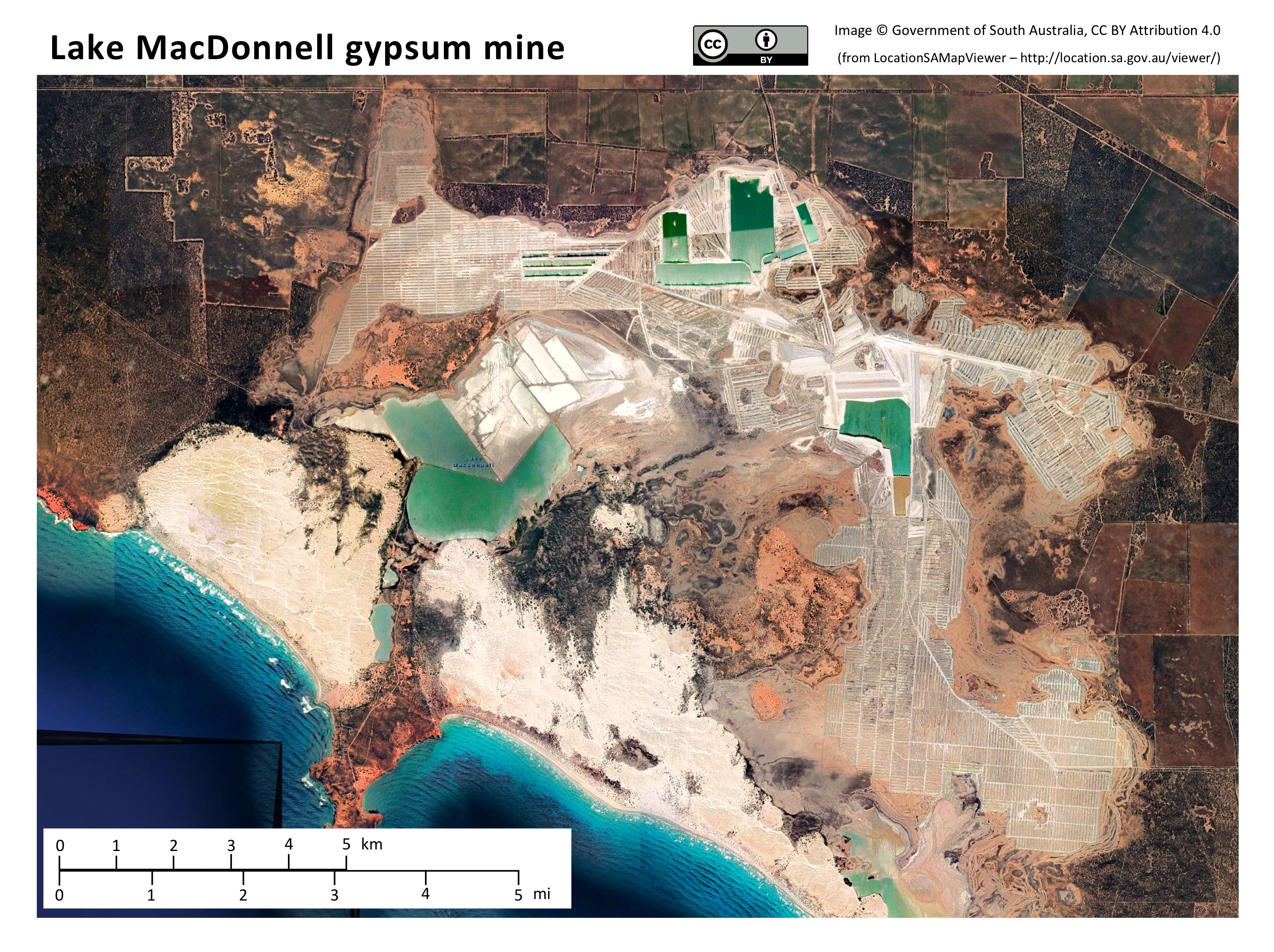
The gypsum deposit at Lake MacDonnell is the largest in the Southern Hemisphere

Gypsum has been mined at Lake MacDonnell since 1919. Since 1984 the mine has been owned by Gypsum Resources Australia (GRA), which is owned 50% each by USG Boral (itself a 50–50 joint venture of USG Corporation and Boral) and CSR Limited. Production is about 3.5 million tonnes (3.4 million long tons) per year.

Gypsum is mined using bulldozers and excavators. It is stockpiled for several years to allow salt to leach out from natural rainfall. It is then loaded onto trains using front-end loaders.

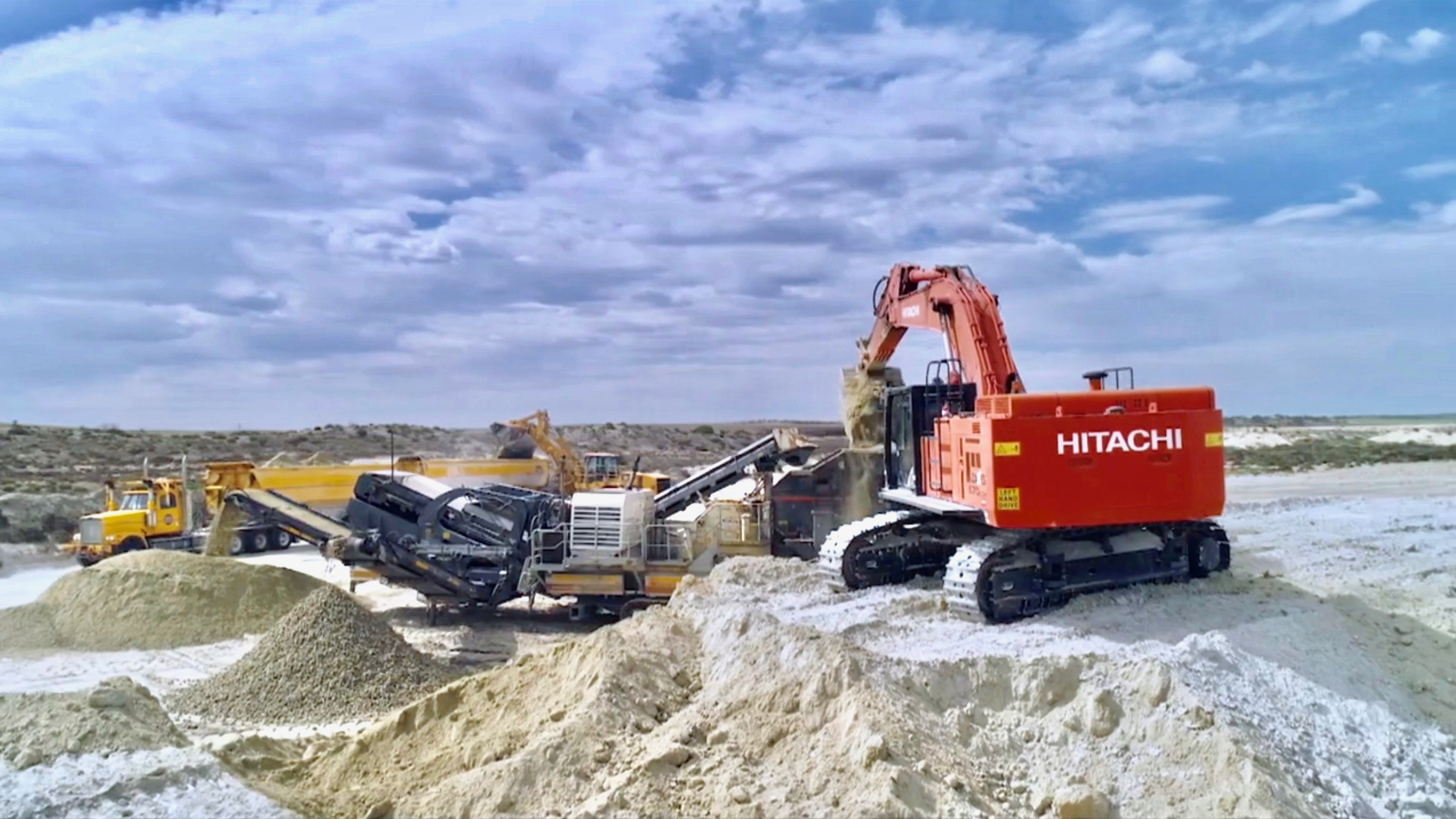
Present-day gypsum mining at Lake MacDonnell

== Railway ==
Gypsum is transported 64 kilometres (40 mi) on an isolated railway operated by Aurizon to the port of Thevenard. Normally three trains run each weekday, with fewer at weekends. It is further stockpiled at Thevenard, then loaded on ships to Glebe Island in Sydney for further processing.

The railway's terminus is named Kevin – deriving from the Hundred of Kevin, which was named after the adopted son of the 19th century South Australian politician Charles Kingston. Originally part of the Port Lincoln Division of the South Australian Railways, the "station", comprising only a small corrugated steel waiting shed, was very rarely used because of the lack of nearby settlement.

== See also ==
- List of lakes of Australia § South Australia
