= Leslie John William Newman =

Australian entomologist

Leslie John William Newman (1878–1938) was an Australian entomologist born at Sandridge (Port Melbourne), Victoria, on 16 February 1878. He became an horticultural inspector for the government of Western Australia. While employed to assess insects of economic concern to introduced food plants, he encouraged staff to capture other species and assembled these into valuable entomological collections.
