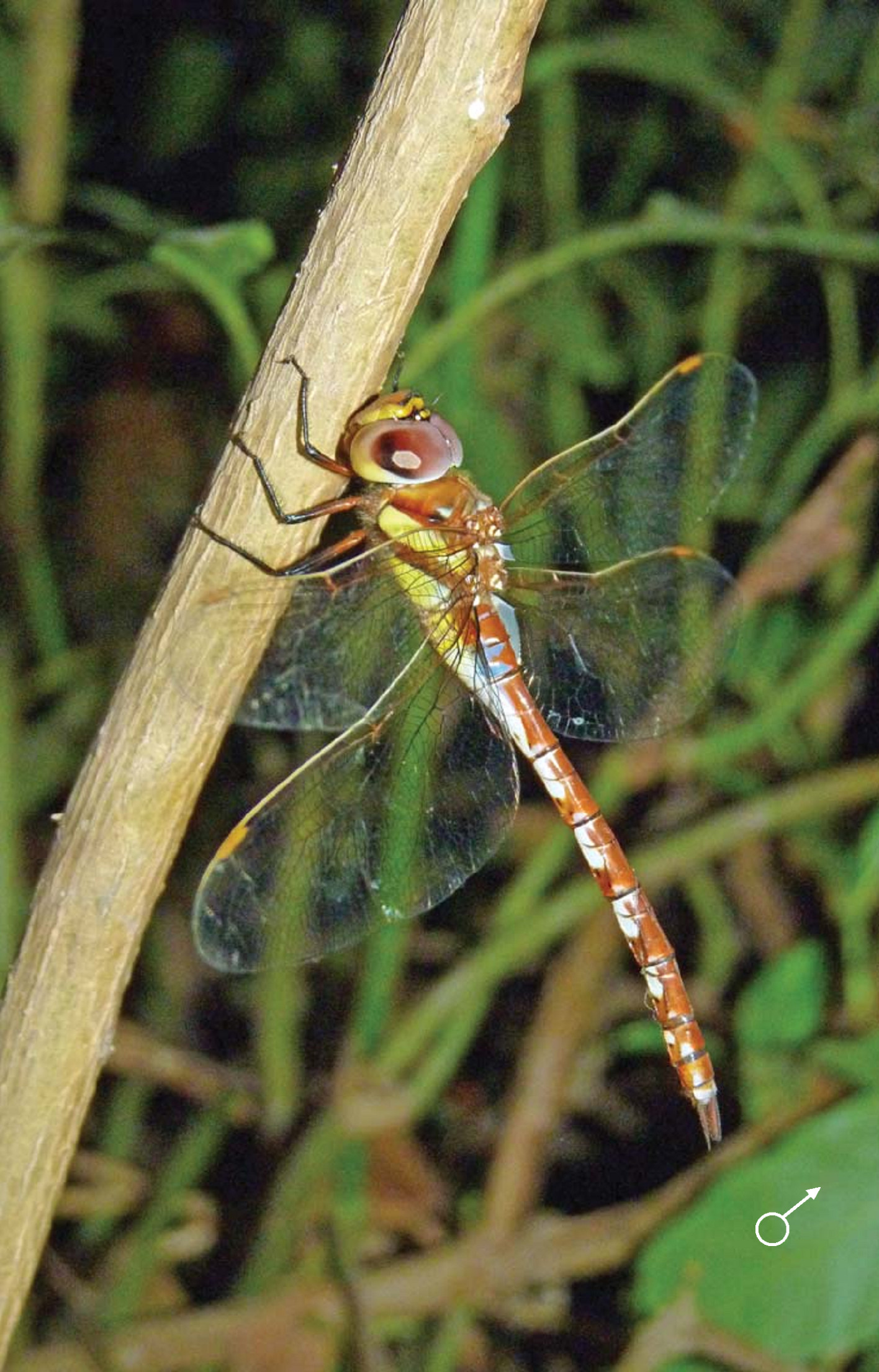
- Male
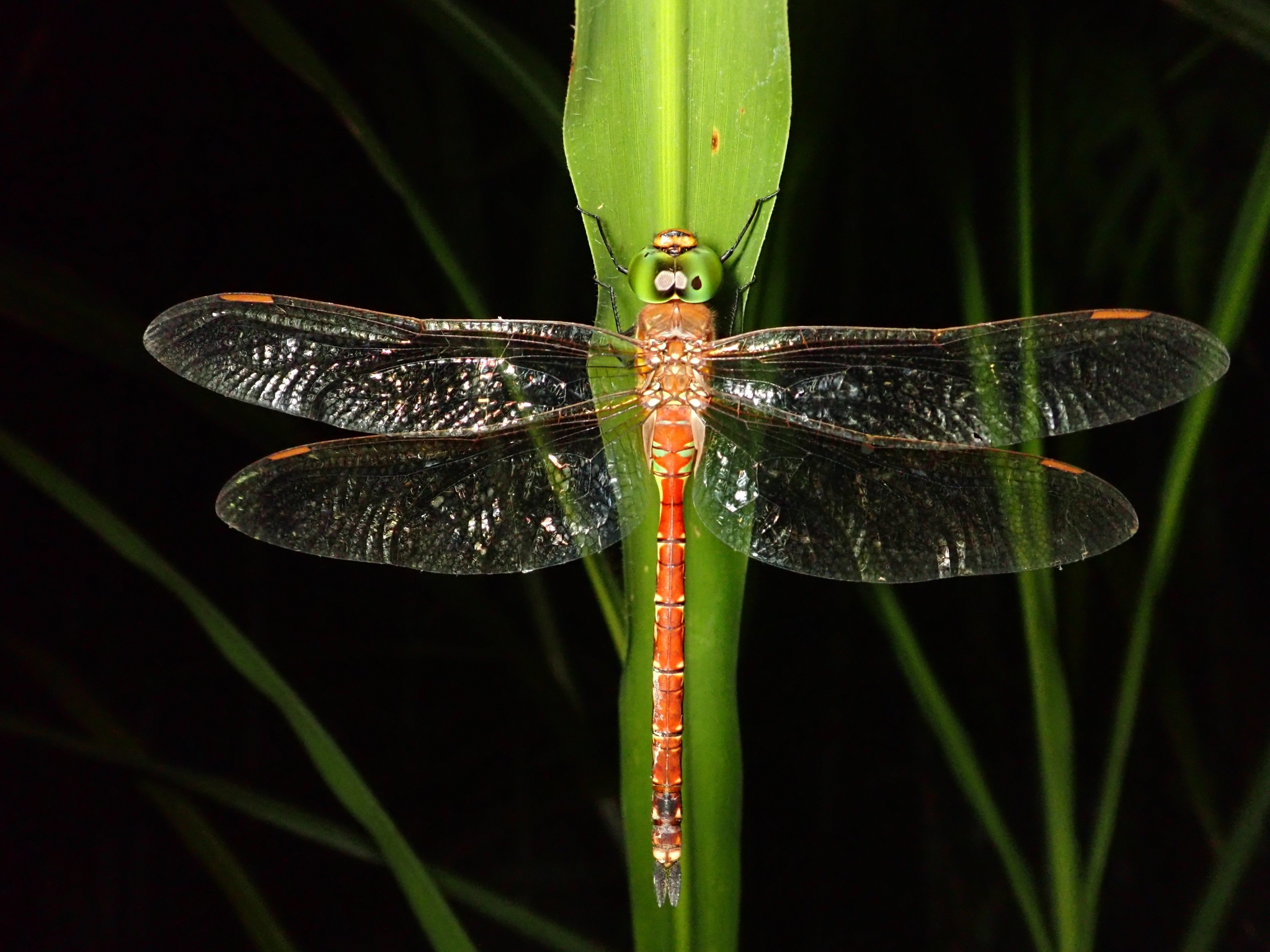
- Female

Conservation status
- Least Concern (IUCN 3.1)

Scientific classification
- Kingdom: Animalia
- Phylum: Arthropoda
- Clade: Pancrustacea
- Class: Insecta
- Order: Odonata
- Infraorder: Anisoptera
- Family: Aeshnidae
- Genus: Anaciaeschna
- Species: A. jaspidea

Binomial name
- Anaciaeschna jaspidea (Burmeister, 1839)

Synonyms
- Aeschna jaspidea Burmeister, 1839; Aeschna tahitensis Brauer, 1865; Protoaeschna pseudochiri Förster, 1908

= Anaciaeschna jaspidea =

Species of dragonfly

Anaciaeschna jaspidea is a species of dragonfly in the family Aeshnidae, commonly known as the Australasian duskhawker and Rusty darner. It is widely distributed from India through Australia to the Pacific.

== Description and habitat ==
Anaciaeschna jaspidea is a large brown dragonfly with blue eyes. Its thorax is reddish-brown, with two broad greenish-yellow stripes on each side. Wings are transparent with pterostigma, reddish-brown. Abdomen is reddish-brown, marked with azure-blue, white, and yellow. Abdomen segment 1 has a large pale yellow spot on each side. Abdomen segment 2 has white marks on the sides and azure-blue on the dorsum with a broad spot of reddish-brown on mid-dorsum. Abdomen segments 3 to 7 are brown on dorsum with black apical annules. Abdomen segments 8 to 10 are darker on dorsum with a pair of dorsal apical spots. Anal appendages are dark reddish-brown. Female appears similar to the male.

Anaciaeschna jaspidea is a crepuscular species, flies during dawn and dusk. It is common in marshes surrounded by woods where it breeds.

== Etymology ==
The genus name Anaciaeschna combines Anax, derived from the Greek ἄναξ (anax, "king" or "sovereign"), with Aeshna. The name refers to similarities with species of Anax, while recognising its distinction from other species placed in Aeshna.

The species name jaspidea is derived from the Latin iaspideus ("jasper-like"), referring to the colourful bands of the mineral jasper and the similar markings on the thorax of this species.

== Gallery ==
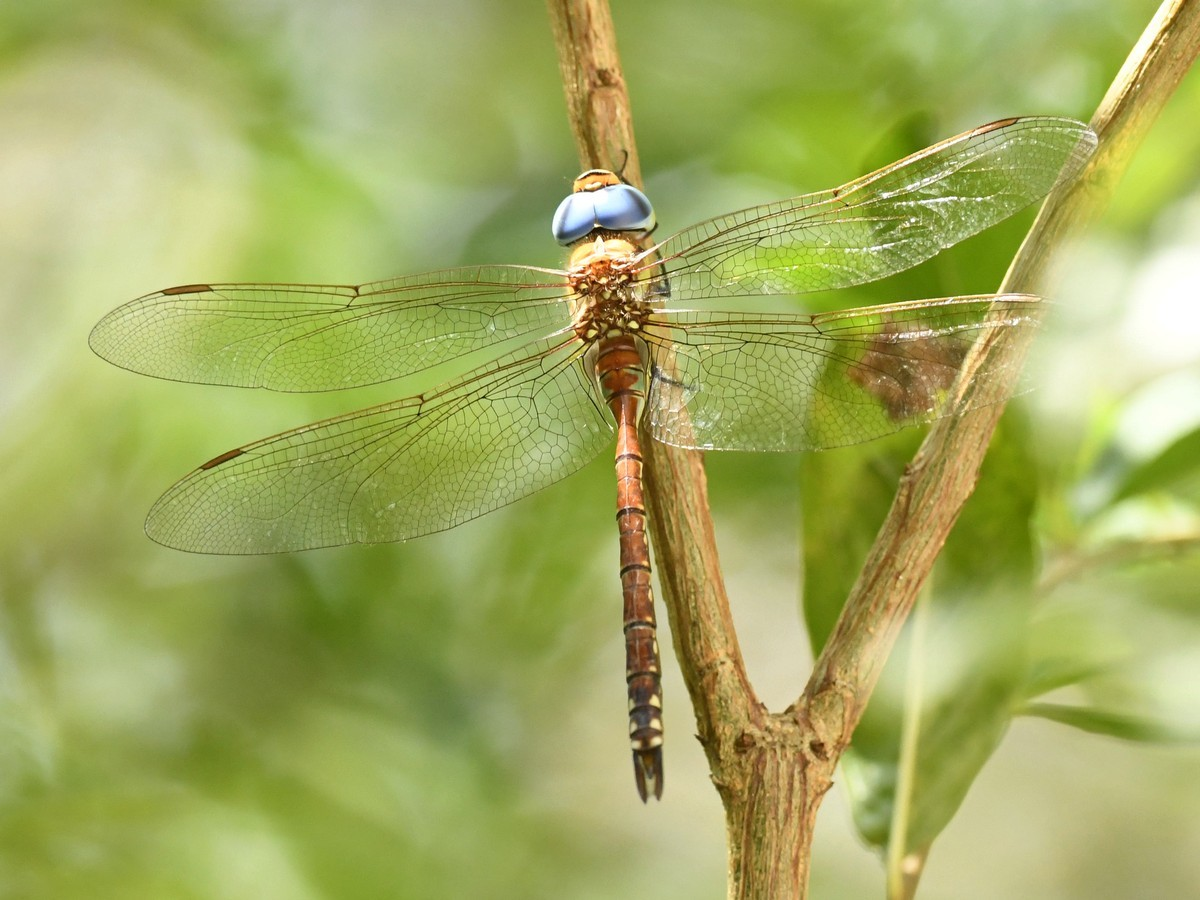
Male, Bengaluru, India

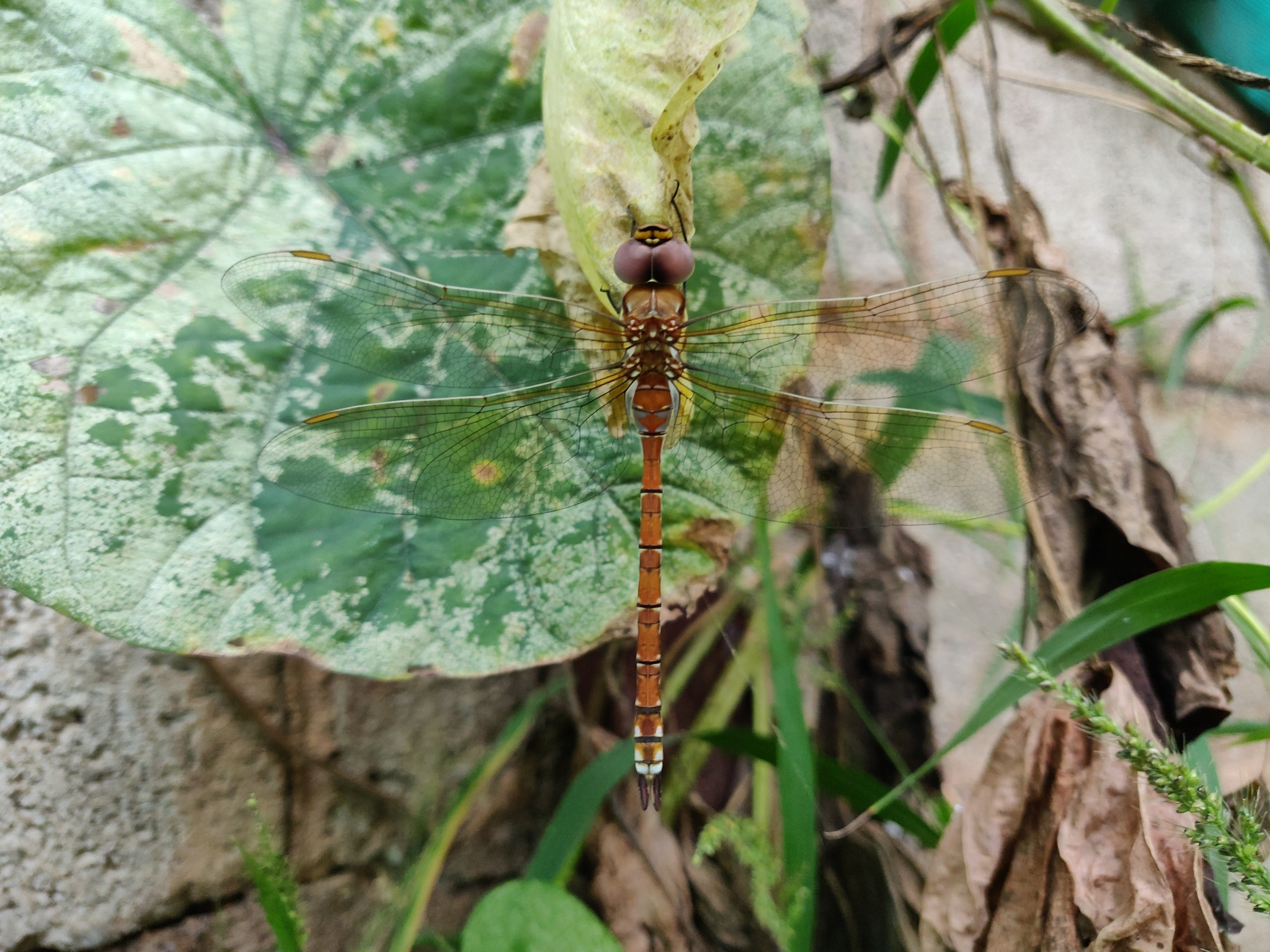
Female, Bengaluru, India

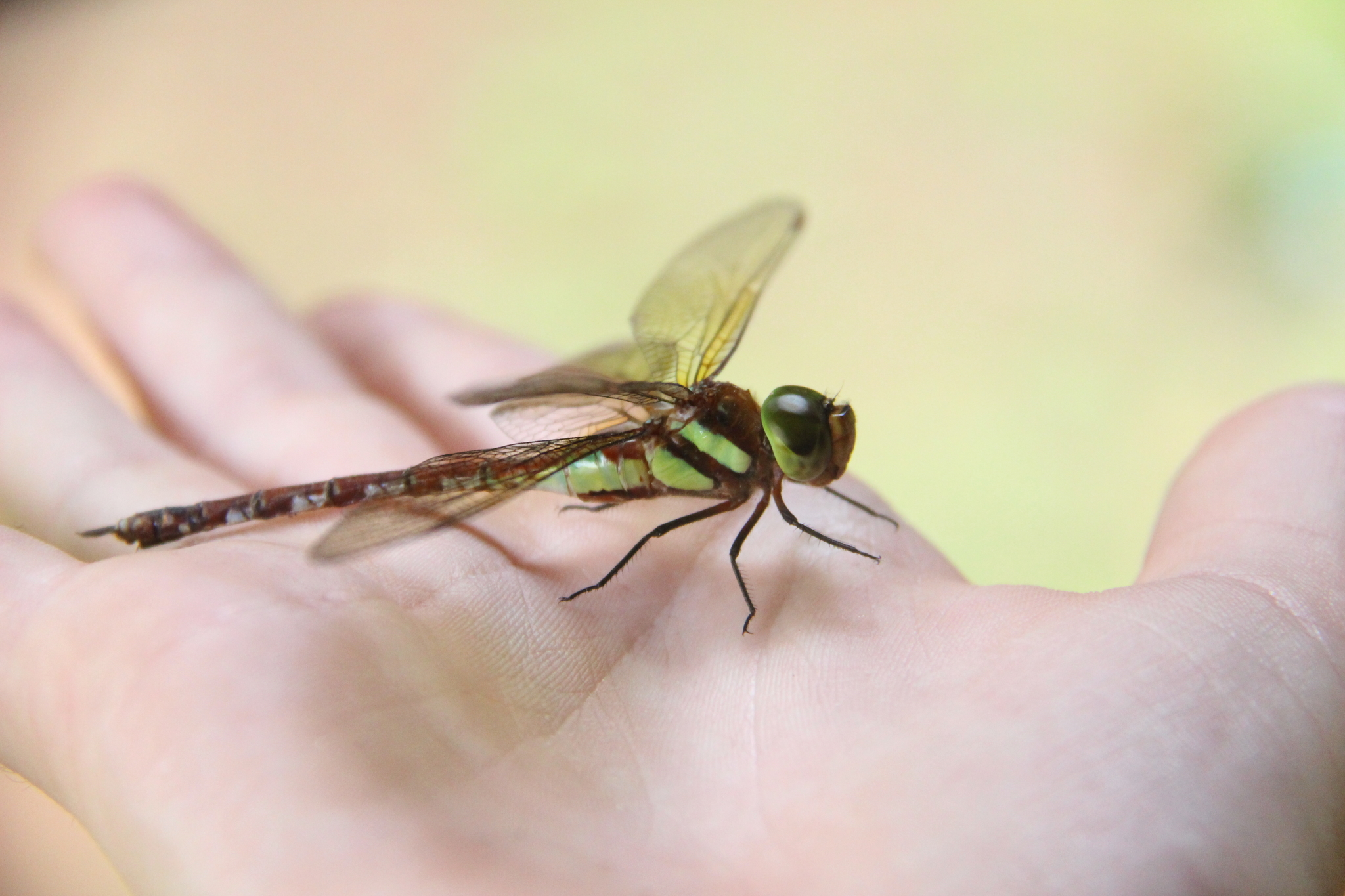
Female, Atiu, Cook Islands

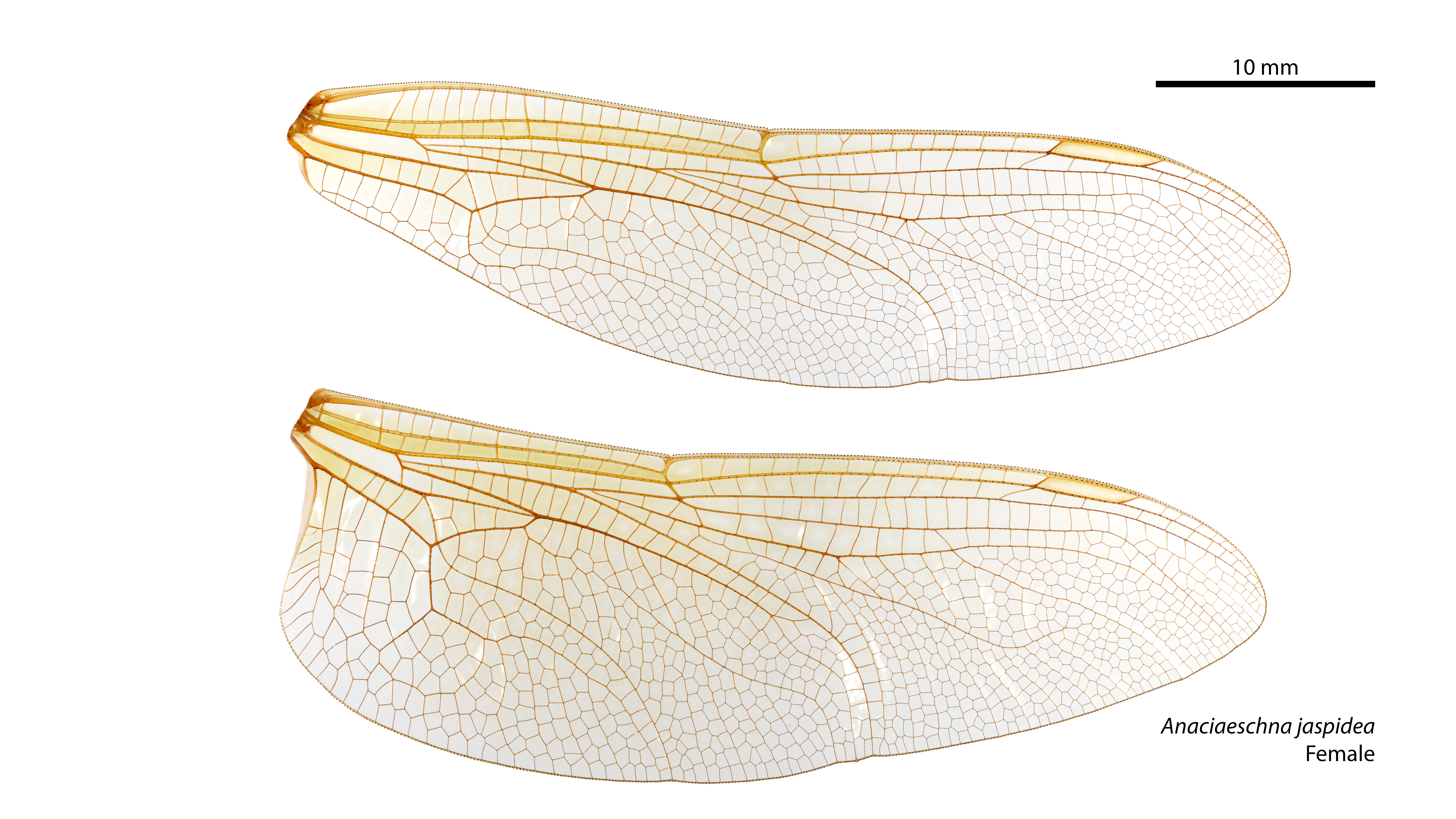
Female wings

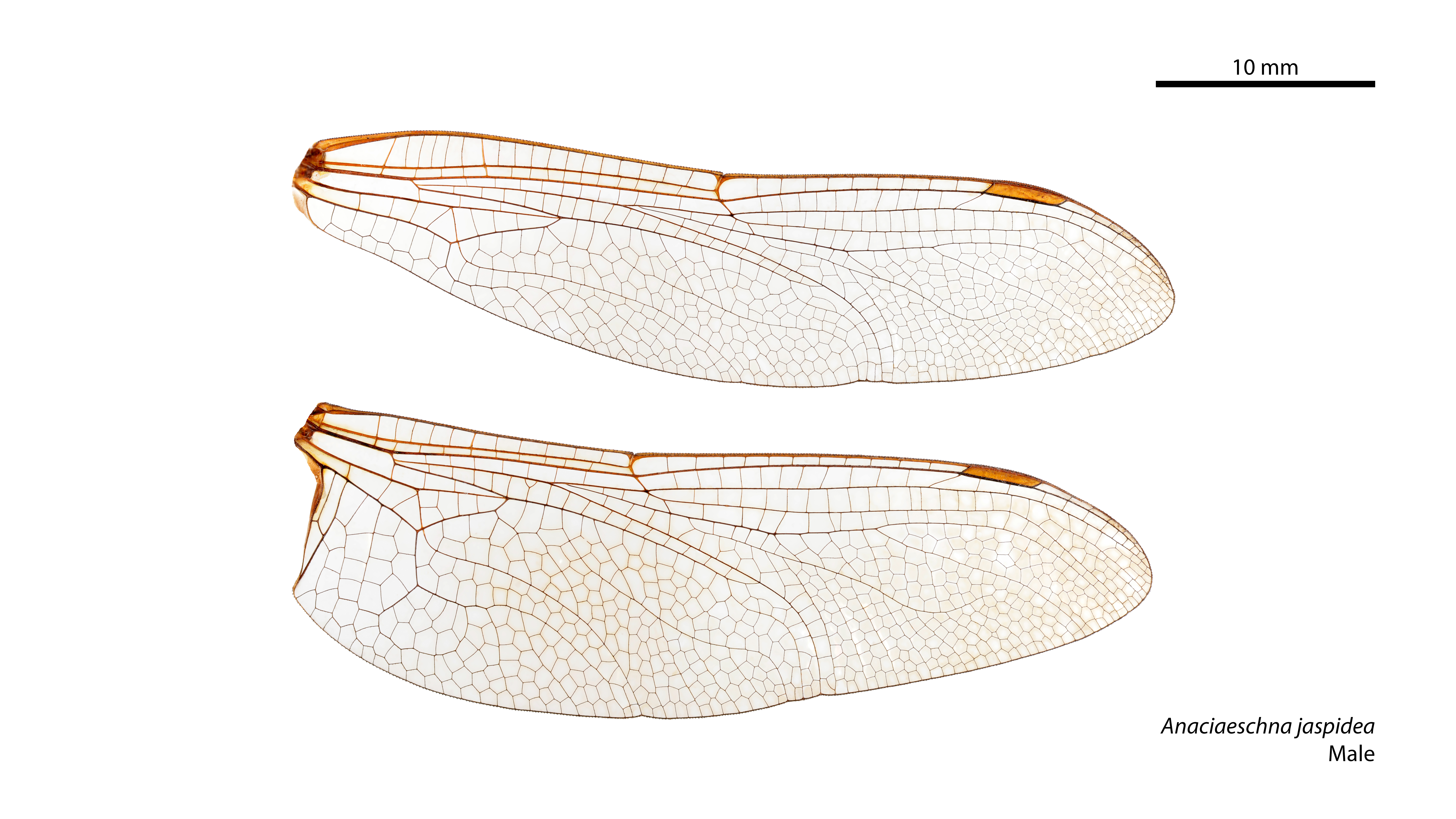
Male wings

== Note ==
The Australasian duskhawker, Anaciaeschna jaspidea, should not be confused with almost-similarly named Australian duskhawker, Austrogynacantha heterogena, a different species of Aeshnid dragonfly.

== See also ==
- List of Odonata species of Australia
- List of odonata species of India
- List of odonata of Kerala
