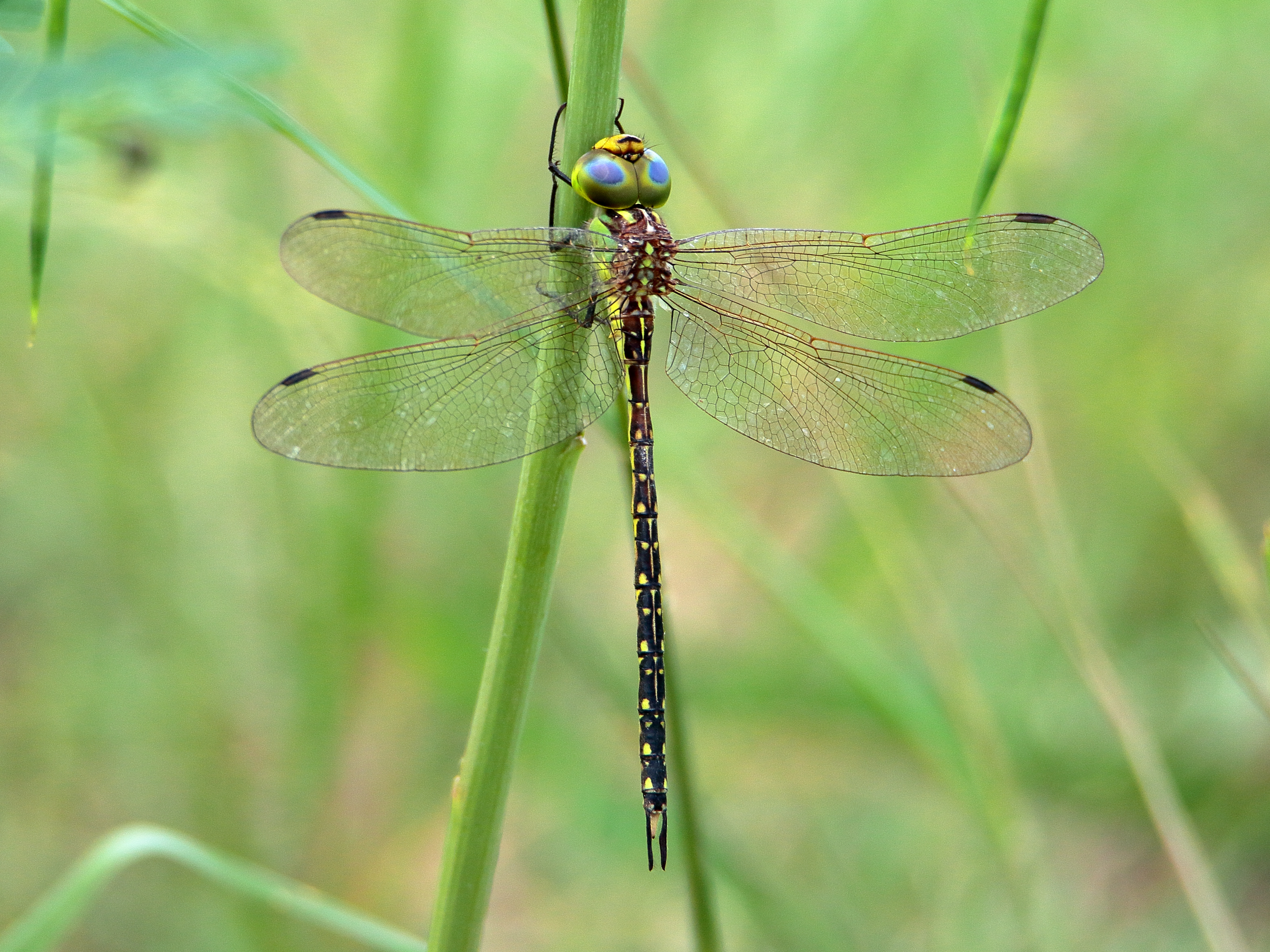
- Male, Queensland
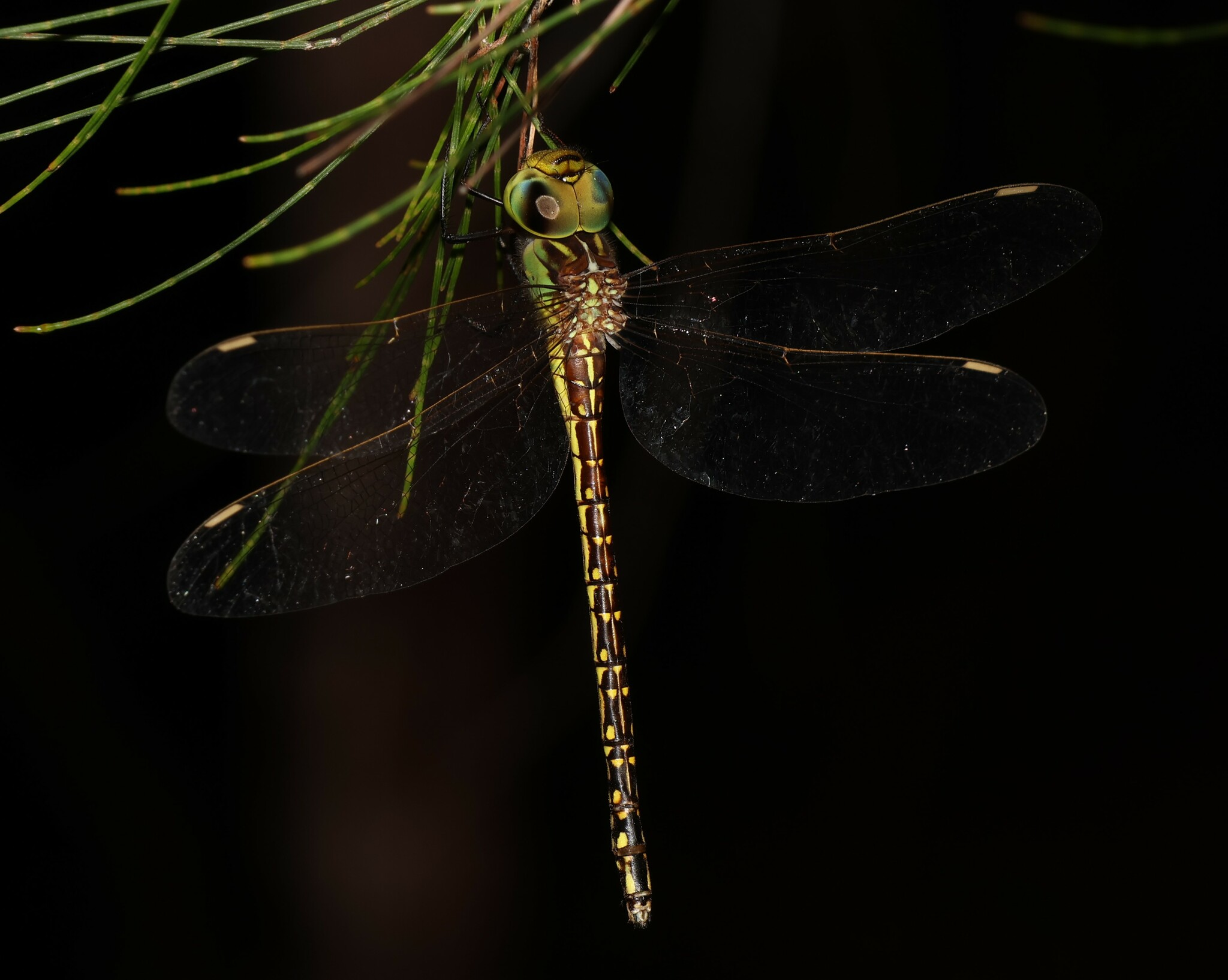
- Female

Conservation status
- Least Concern (IUCN 3.1)

Scientific classification
- Kingdom: Animalia
- Phylum: Arthropoda
- Clade: Pancrustacea
- Class: Insecta
- Order: Odonata
- Infraorder: Anisoptera
- Family: Aeshnidae
- Genus: Austrogynacantha; Tillyard, 1908
- Species: A. heterogena

Binomial name
- Austrogynacantha heterogena Tillyard, 1908

= Austrogynacantha =

Australian duskhawker

Genus of dragonflies

Austrogynacantha is a genus of dragonfly in the family Aeshnidae. Austrogynacantha heterogena, commonly known as the Australian duskhawker, is the only known species of this genus which is found in Australia and New Caledonia.

Austrogynacantha heterogena is a medium-sized dragonfly, darkly coloured with bright green or yellow markings. It is a vagrant, is active at dawn and dusk, and inhabits still waters.

== Etymology ==
The genus name Austrogynacantha combines the prefix austro- (from Latin auster, meaning “south wind”, hence “southern”) with Gynacantha, a genus name derived from Greek γυνή (gynē, “woman”) and ἄκανθα (akantha, “thorn”). The name refers to a southern representative of that group.

The species name heterogena is derived from Greek ἕτερος (heteros, “other”) and γένεσις (genesis, “origin”), referring to its placement in a different genus from Gynacantha.

== Gallery ==
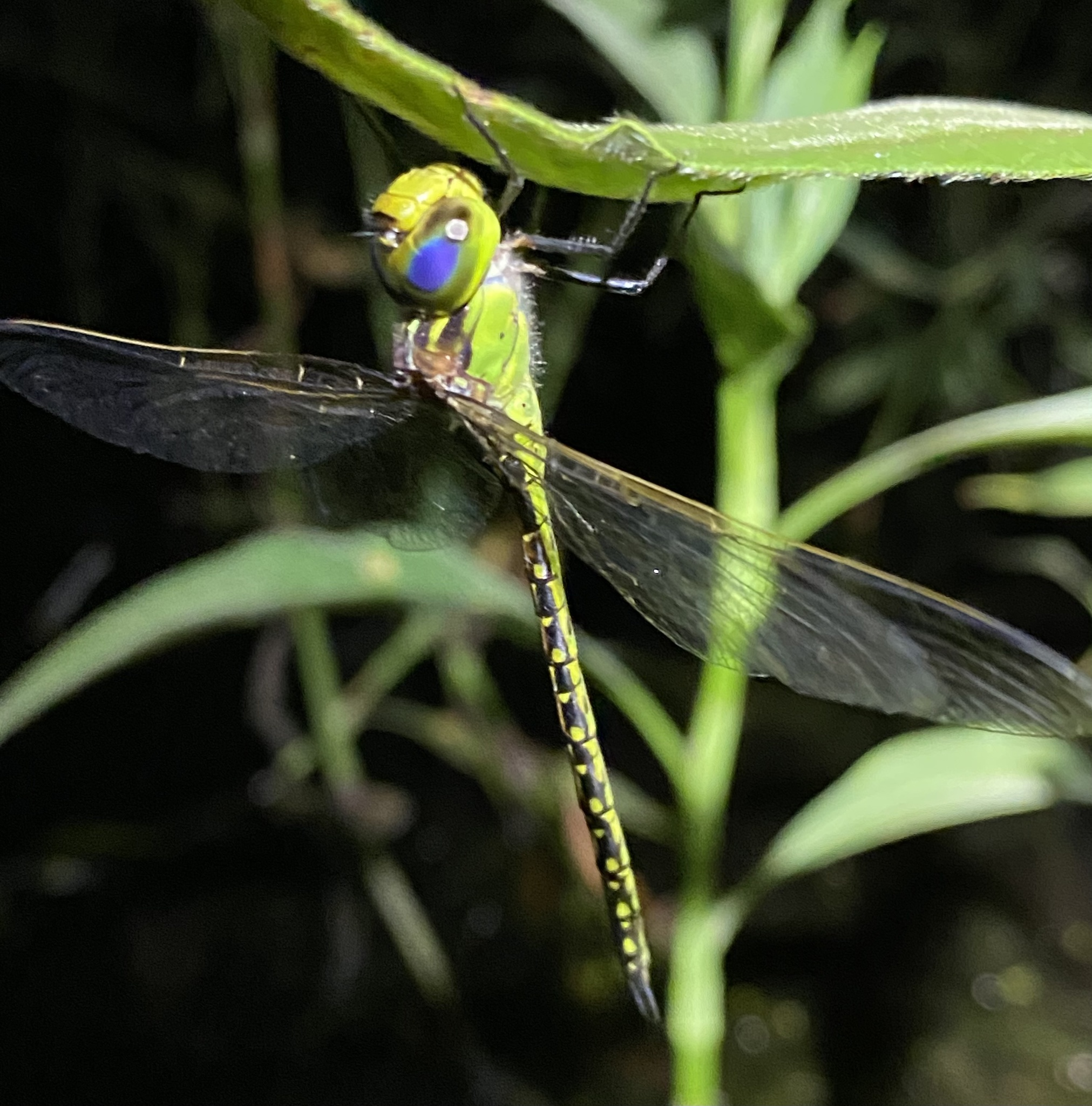
Male

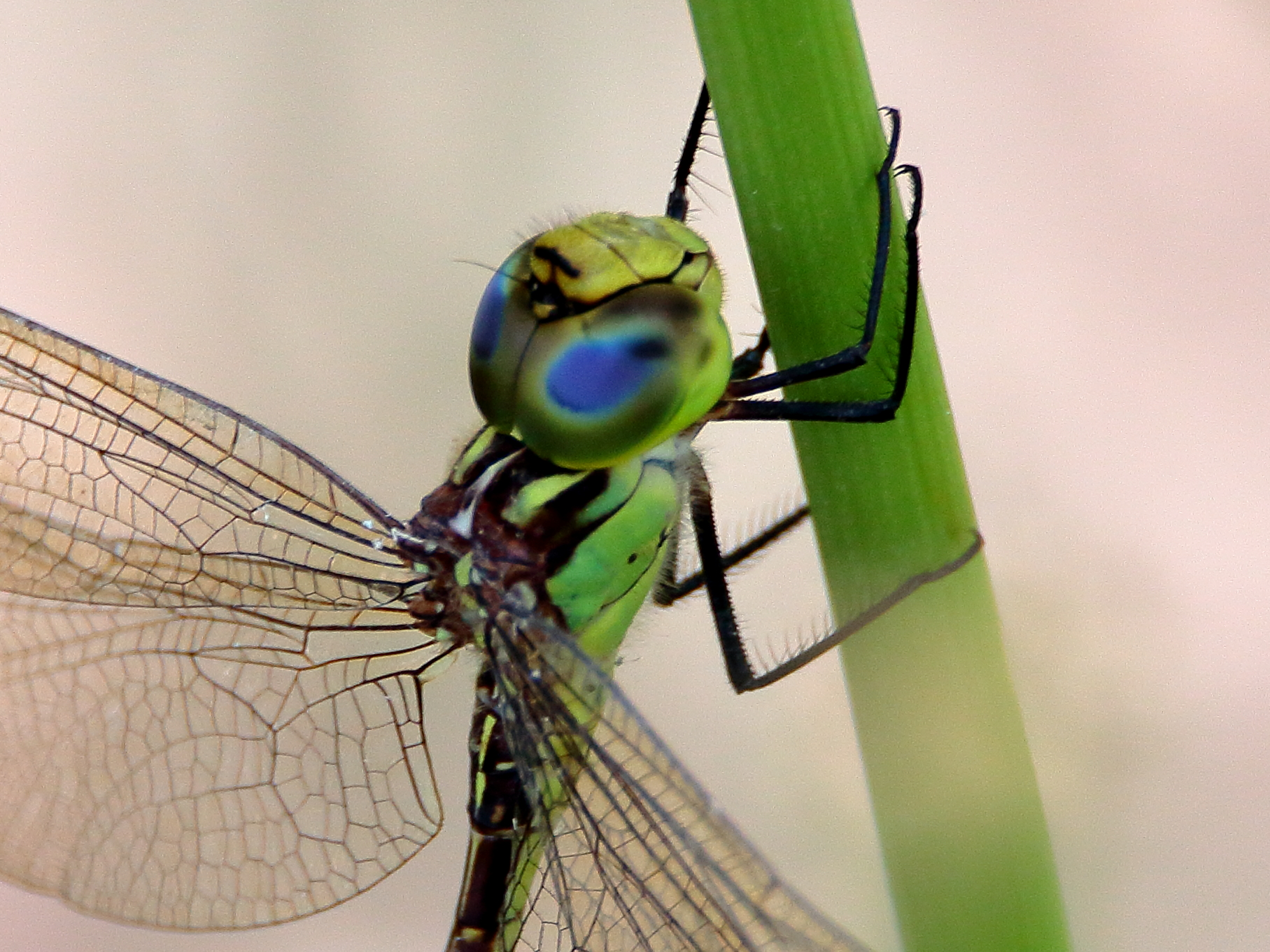
Close-up of head

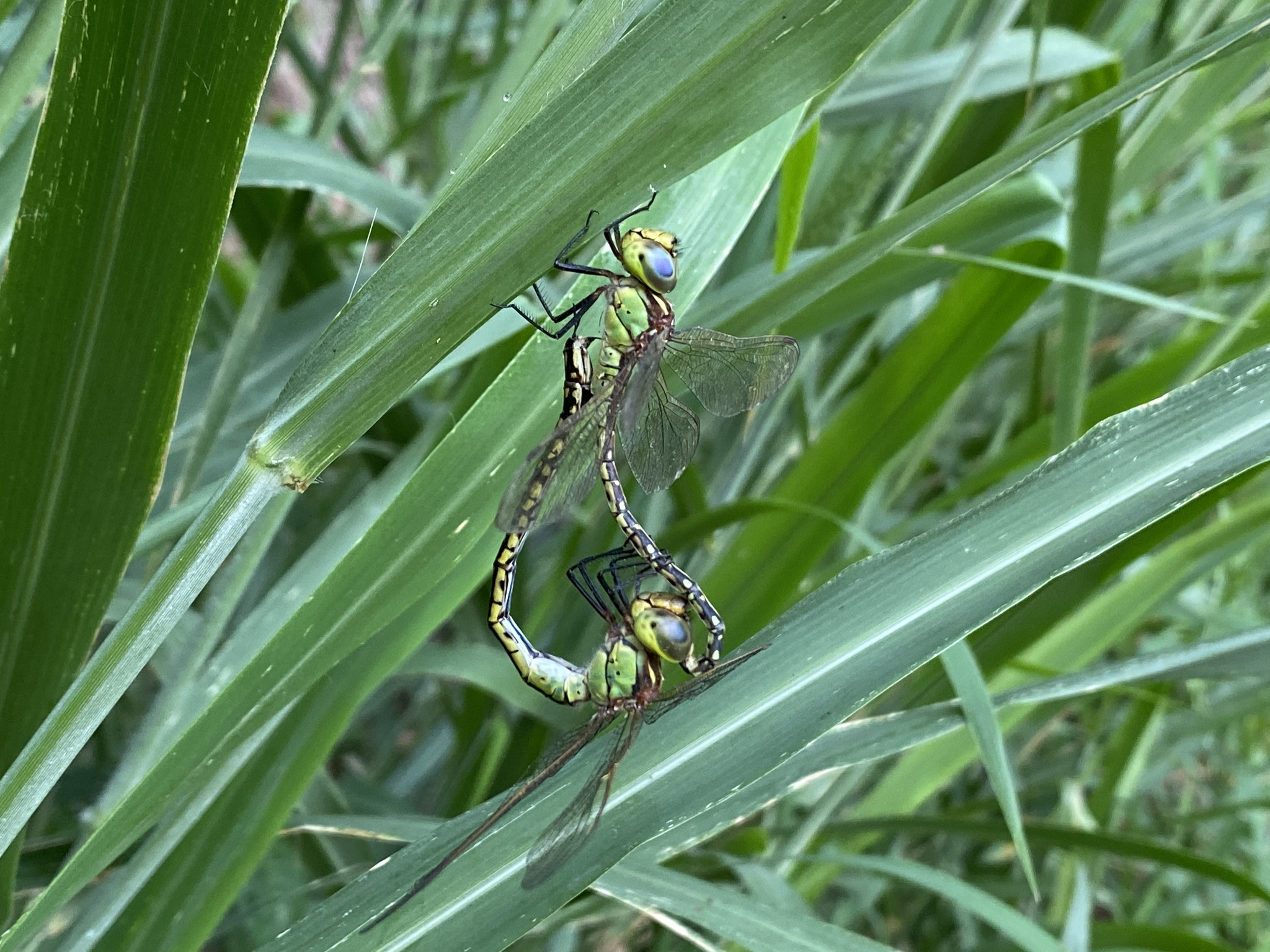
Mating, male above

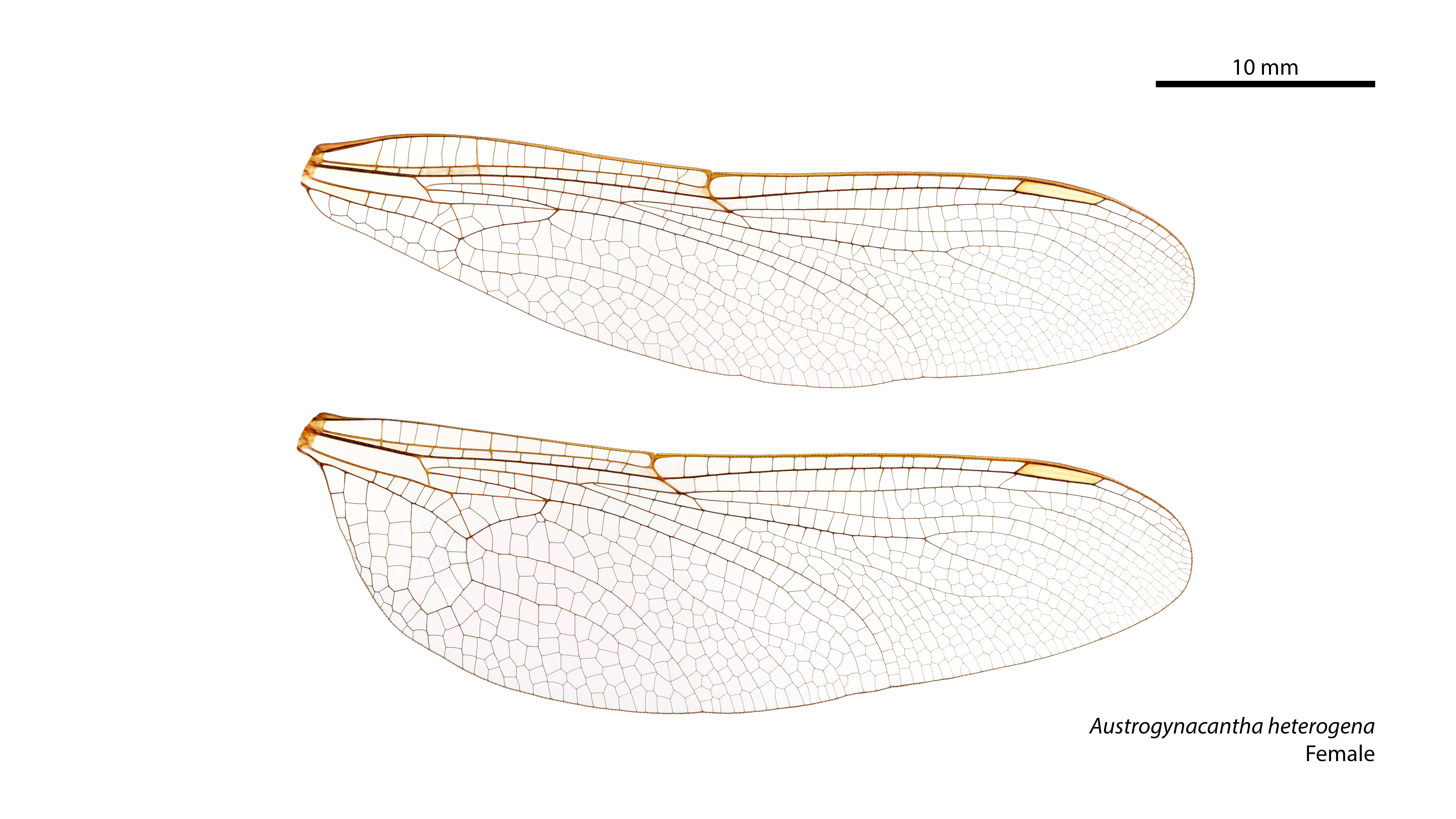
Female Austrogynacantha heterogena wings

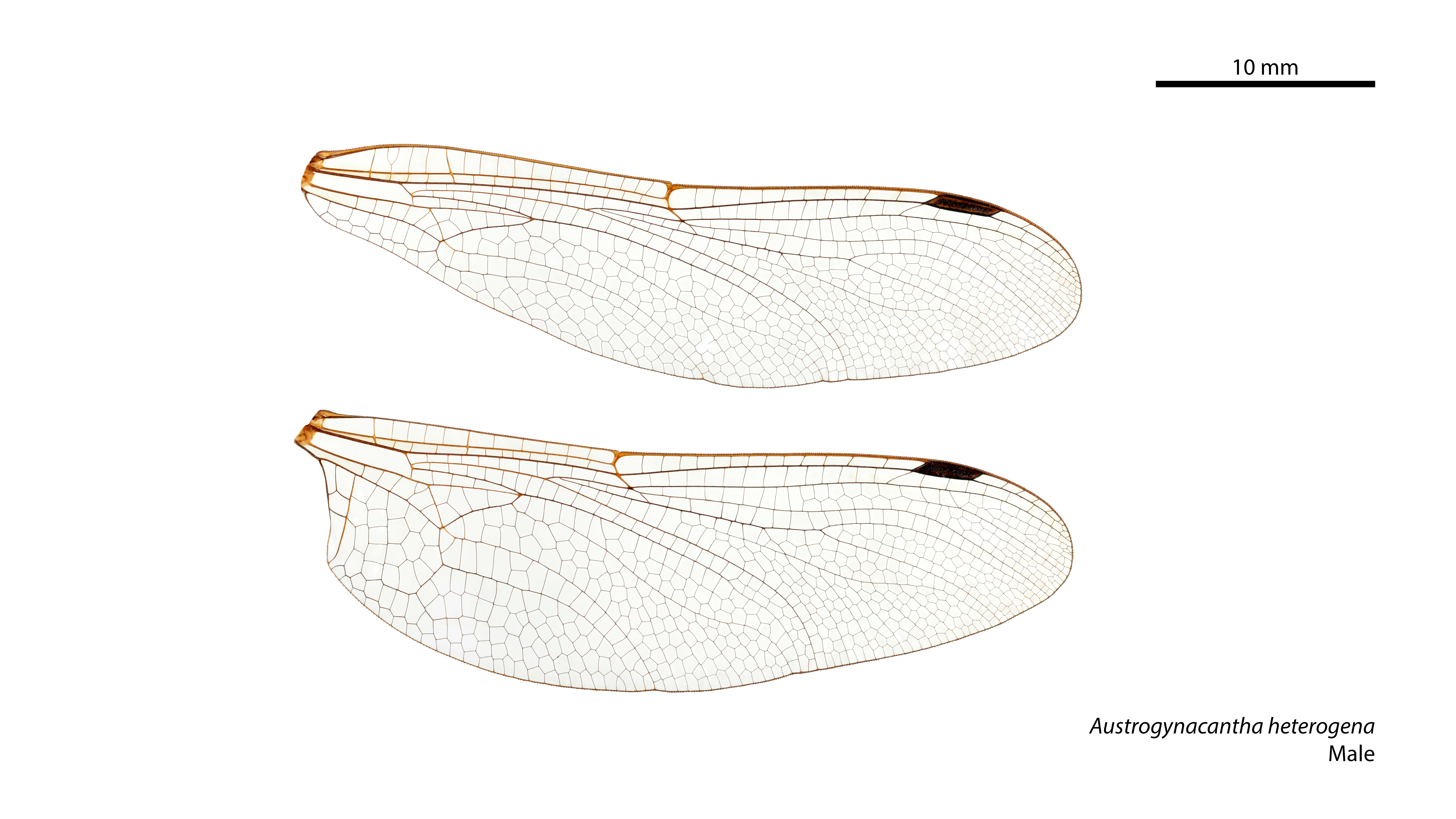
Male Austrogynacantha heterogena wings

== Note ==
The Australian duskhawker, Austrogynacantha heterogena, should not be confused with almost-similarly named Australasian duskhawker, Anaciaeschna jaspidea, a different species of Aeshnid dragonfly.
