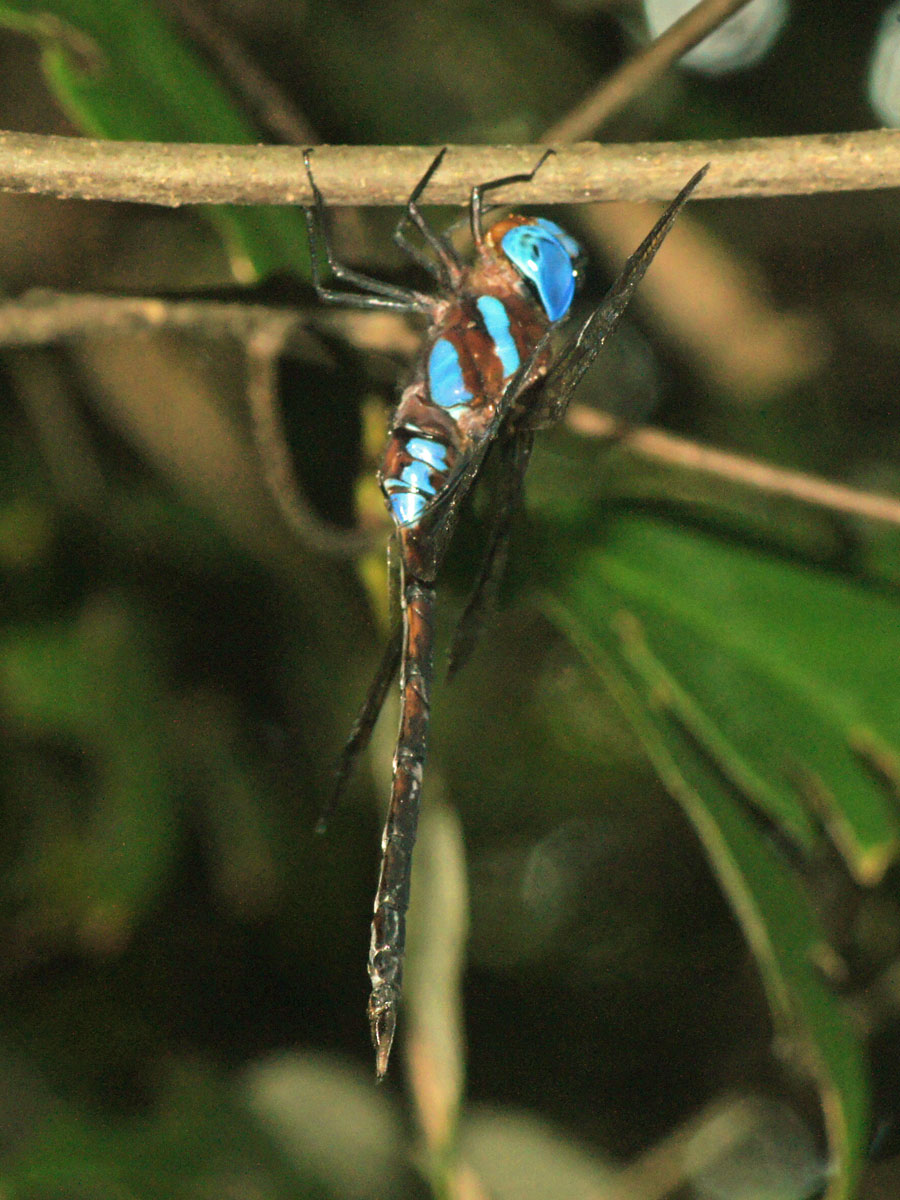

Conservation status
- Least Concern (IUCN 3.1)

Scientific classification
- Kingdom: Animalia
- Phylum: Arthropoda
- Class: Insecta
- Order: Odonata
- Infraorder: Anisoptera
- Family: Aeshnidae
- Genus: Anaciaeschna
- Species: A. martini

Binomial name
- Anaciaeschna martini (Sélys, 1897)

Synonyms
- Aeschna martini Sélys, 1897; Anaciaeschna donaldi Fraser, 1922

= Anaciaeschna martini =

Species of dragonfly

Anaciaeschna martini, is a species of dragonfly in the family Aeshnidae. It is found in Japan, India, Sri Lanka, and recently from Nepal.

== Description and habitat ==
Sélys described this species in 1897 from Yokohama, Japan. Fraser described Anaciaeschna donaldi from specimens collected from Kodaikanal, Yercaud and Ooty. It flies at dusk and breeds in still water in the lakes. Its eyes are dark olivaceous brown, prothorax is dark brown, and thorax is maroon with apple green marks. Its abdomen is dark brown with apple green mark on first three segments and pale yellowish brown marks on the sides of segments four to seven.

There are no significant in morphological or molecular genetic differences between A. donaldi and A. martini; therefore it is possible that A. donaldi should be a junior synonym of A. martini, but the IUCN still maintains it as valid.

== See also ==
- List of odonates of India
- List of odonates of Sri Lanka
- List of odonata of Kerala
