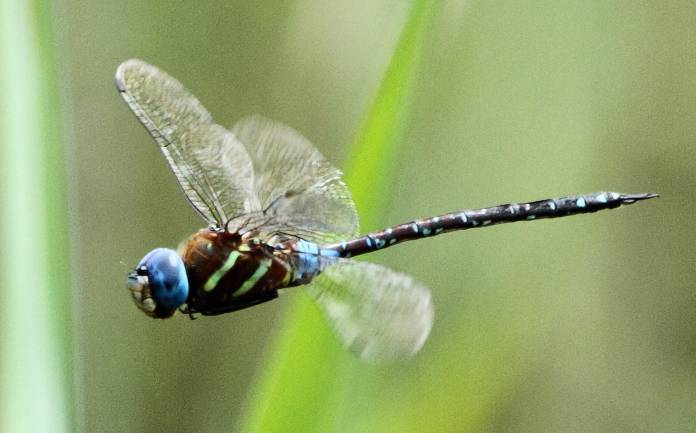

Conservation status
- Least Concern (IUCN 3.1)

Scientific classification
- Kingdom: Animalia
- Phylum: Arthropoda
- Class: Insecta
- Order: Odonata
- Infraorder: Anisoptera
- Family: Aeshnidae
- Genus: Anaciaeschna
- Species: A. triangulifera

Binomial name
- Anaciaeschna triangulifera McLachlan, 1896

= Anaciaeschna triangulifera =

Species of dragonfly

Anaciaeschna triangulifera is a species of dragonfly in the family Aeshnidae. It is found in Angola, the Democratic Republic of the Congo, Ethiopia, Kenya, Madagascar, Malawi, Mozambique, Nigeria, Sierra Leone, South Africa, Tanzania, Uganda, Zambia, Zimbabwe, and possibly Burundi. Its natural habitats are subtropical or tropical dry forests, subtropical or tropical moist lowland forests, subtropical or tropical dry shrubland, subtropical or tropical moist shrubland, rivers, intermittent rivers, shrub-dominated wetlands, freshwater marshes, and intermittent freshwater marshes.
