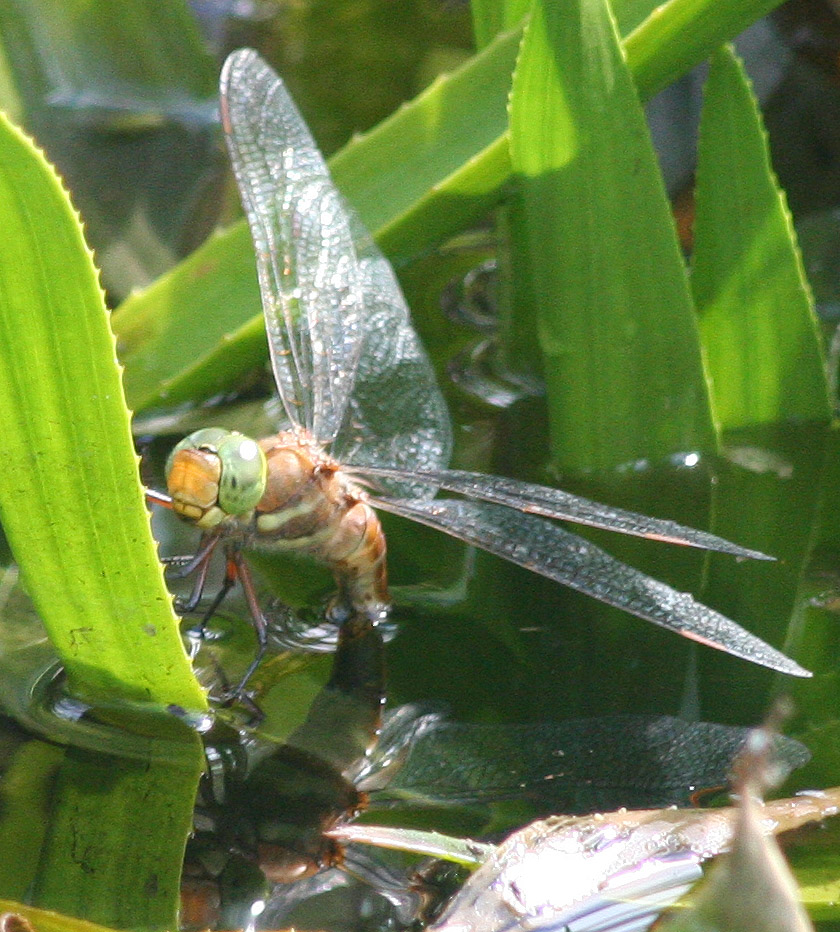
- Anaciaeschna isosceles

Scientific classification
- Kingdom: Animalia
- Phylum: Arthropoda
- Clade: Pancrustacea
- Class: Insecta
- Order: Odonata
- Infraorder: Anisoptera
- Family: Aeshnidae
- Genus: Anaciaeschna; Selys, 1878

Synonyms
- Protoaeschna Förster, 1908

= Anaciaeschna =

Genus of dragonflies

Anaciaeschna is a genus of dragonflies in the family Aeshnidae. Species of Anaciaeschna are found in Africa, Asia and Australia.

Anaciaeschna are large, tawny brown dragonflies. They are nomadic and crepuscular.

== Species ==
The genus Anaciaeschna includes the following species:

- Anaciaeschna donaldi Fraser, 1922
- Anaciaeschna (Aeshna) isosceles (Müller, 1767) – green-eyed hawker, Norfolk hawker
- Anaciaeschna jaspidea (Burmeister, 1839) – Australasian duskhawker
- Anaciaeschna kashimirensis Singh & Baijal, 1954
- Anaciaeschna martini (Selys, 1897)
- Anaciaeschna megalopis Martin, 1908
- Anaciaeschna melanostoma Lieftinck, 1949
- Anaciaeschna moluccana Lieftinck, 1930
- Anaciaeschna montivagans Lieftinck, 1932
- Anaciaeschna triangulifera McLachlan, 1896 – evening hawker

== Etymology ==
The genus name Anaciaeschna combines Anax, derived from the Greek ἄναξ (anax, "king" or "sovereign"), with Aeshna. The name refers to similarities with species of Anax, while recognising its distinction from other species placed in Aeshna.
