= 1987 in paleontology =

Paleontology or palaeontology is the study of prehistoric life forms on Earth through the examination of plant and animal fossils. This includes the study of body fossils, tracks (ichnites), burrows, cast-off parts, fossilised feces (coprolites), palynomorphs and chemical residues. Because humans have encountered fossils for millennia, paleontology has a long history both before and after becoming formalized as a science. This article records significant discoveries and events related to paleontology that occurred or were published in the year 1987.

== Plants ==
=== Basal eudicots ===
==== Proteales ====
Name	Novelty	Status	Authors	Age	Unit	Location	Synonymized taxa	Notes	Images
Langeria	gen et sp nov	Valid	Wolfe & Wehr	Eocene; Ypresian	Okanagan Highlands; Klondike Mountain Formation	US; Washington		First described as a witch-hazel genus The type species is L. magnifica	Langeria magnifica
Macginitiea	Gen et comb nov	Valid	Wolfe & Wehr	Paleocene	Fort Union Formation	USA; Wyoming	A platanaceous genus The type species is Liquidambar gracile (1872)	synonymy: Aralia gracilis Lesquereux 1878; Aralia notata Lesquereux 1878; Aralia republicensis Brown 1937; Aralia whitneyi auct. non Lesquereux nec. Berry, 1929; Platanus appendiculata auct. non Lesquereux nec. Berry, 1929; Platanus dubia Lesquereux (non Ettingshausen), 1874; Platanus nobilis auct. non Newberry. Brown, 1962 p.p. nec Hickey, 1977	Macginitiea gracilis

=== Superasterids ===
==== Cornales ====
Name	Novelty	Status	Authors	Age	Unit	Location	Synonymized taxa	Notes	Images
Tsukada	gen et sp nov	Valid	Wolfe & Wehr	Eocene; Ypresian	Okanagan Highlands; Klondike Mountain Formation	US; Washington		A dove-tree relative The type species is T. davidiifolia	Tsukada davidiifolia

==== Santalales ====
Name	Novelty	Status	Authors	Age	Unit	Location	Synonymized taxa	Notes	Images
Schoepfia republicensis	Comb nov	Valid	(Lamotte) Wolfe & Wehr	Eocene; Ypresian	Okanagan Highlands; Klondike Mountain Formation	US; Washington	Cornus acuminata Berry, 1929	First suggested to be a Schoepfia relative, Moved from Cornus republicensis 1944	Schoepfia republicensis

=== Superrosids ===
==== Fagales ====
Name	Novelty	Status	Authors	Age	Unit	Location	Synonymized taxa	Notes	Images
Alnus parvifolia	Comb nov	Valid	Wolfe & Wehr	Eocene; Ypresian	Okanagan Highlands; Klondike Mountain Formation	US; Washington	synonymy: Alnus corralina auct. non Lesquereux nec Brown, 1937 (p. p.); Alnus elliptica Berry, 1929; Betula parvifolia Berry, 1926; Carpinus grandis auct. non Unger. nec Berry, 1926 (p. p.)	An alder species Moved from Betula parvifolia (1926)	Alnus parvifolia
Betula leopoldae	sp nov	Valid	Wolfe & Wehr	Eocene; Ypresian	Okanagan Highlands; Klondike Mountain Formation	US; Washington		A birch species	Betula leopoldae
Carya washingtonensis	sp nov	Valid	Manchester	Miocene; Langhian	Badger Pocket-Squaw Creek, Wanapum Basalts	USA; Washington		described from one of the oldest rodent nut caches known	
Fagopsis undulata	Comb nov	Valid	(Knowlton) Wolfe & Wehr	Paleocene	Langford Formation	US; Wyoming	synonymy: Carpinus grandis auct. non Unger. nec Dawson, 1890; Fagopsis longifolia p.p. auct. non (Lesquereux) Hollick nec. Becker, 1961	A fagaceous species Moved from Fagus undulata (1899)	Fagopsis undulata

==== Malvales ====
Name	Novelty	Status	Authors	Age	Unit	Location	Synonymized taxa	Notes	Images
Tilia johnsoni	sp nov	Valid	Wolfe & Wehr	Eocene; Ypresian	Okanagan Highlands; Klondike Mountain Formation	US; Washington		A linden species	Tilia johnsoni

==== Rosales ====
Name	Novelty	Status	Authors	Age	Unit	Location	Synonymized taxa	Notes	Images
Photinia pageae	sp nov	Valid	Wolfe & Wehr	Eocene; Ypresian	Okanagan Highlands; Klondike Mountain Formation	US; Washington		A Photinia species	Photinia pageae

==== Sapindales ====
Name	Novelty	Status	Authors	Age	Unit	Location	Synonymized taxa	Notes	Images
Acer alaskense	Sect and sp nov	Valid	Wolfe & Tanai	Latest Paleocene	Chickaloon Formation	USA; Alaska		Oldest Acer sp in Alaska; Only species of the section Alaskana	
Acer ashwilli	sp nov	Valid	Wolfe & Tanai	early Oligocene	John Day Formation	USA; Oregon		extinct member of section Ginnala	
Acer browni	sp nov	Valid	Wolfe & Tanai	early - Middle Miocene	Collawash flora and several other floras	USA Canada		extinct member of section Parviflora	
Acer castorrivularis	sp nov	Valid	Wolfe & Tanai	Late Eocene	Beaver Creek Flora	USA; Montana		extinct member of section Macrantha	
Acer clarnoense	sp nov	Valid	Wolfe & Tanai	Late Eocene	John Day Formation	USA; Oregon		extinct member of section Macrantha	
Acer dettermani	sp nov	Valid	Wolfe & Tanai	Late Eocene - early Oligocene	Meshik Volcanics	USA; Alaska		extinct member of section Macrantha	
Acer douglasense	sect and sp nov	Valid	Wolfe & Tanai	early Eocene	West Foreland Formation	USA; Alaska		Only species of the section Douglasa	
Acer eonegundo	Sp. nov.	valid	Wolfe & Tanai	Middle-Late Eocene	"Bull Run" Flora	USA		extinct species of Acer sect. Negundo	
Acer ferrignoi	sp nov	valid	Wolfe & Tanai	Late Miocene	Lolo pass flora	USA; Oregon		Member of Acer Section Rubra	
Acer hillsi	sp nov	Valid	Wolfe & Tanai	Eocene; Ypresian	Okanagan Highlands; Klondike Mountain Formation	US; Washington		one of two species in the extinct section Stewarta	
Acer ivanofense	sp nov	Valid	Wolfe & Tanai	Latest Eocene - Early Oligocene	Meshik Volcanics	USA; Alaska		extinct member of section Glabra	
Acer kenaicum	sp nov	Valid	Wolfe & Tanai	Oligocene	Tsadaka Formation & Tyonek Formation	USA; Alaska		extinct member of section Rubra	
Acer latahense	sp nov	Valid	Wolfe & Tanai	early - Late Miocene	Latah Formation	USA; Washington		extinct member of Acer section Macrantha	
Acer lincolnense	Sp. nov.	valid	Wolfe & Tanai	Late Eocene	Beaver Creek Flora	USA; Montana		A possible member of Acer sect. Cissifolia	
Acer republicense	Sect and sp nov	Valid	Wolfe & Tanai	Eocene; Ypresian	Okanagan Highlands; Klondike Mountain Formation	USA; Washington		type and only species in the extinct section Republica	
Acer rousei	sp nov	Valid	Wolfe & Tanai	Eocene; Ypresian	Okanagan Highlands; Allenby Formation	Canada; British Columbia		only species in the extinct section Rousea	
Acer smileyi	sp nov	Valid	Wolfe & Tanai	Late Oligocene - Middle Miocene	Clarkia and other formations	USA; Idaho		extinct member of section Parviflora	
Acer stewarti	sp nov	Valid	Wolfe & Tanai	Eocene; Ypresian	Okanagan Highlands; Allenby Formation	Canada; British Columbia		one of two species in the extinct section Stewarta	
Acer stonebergae	sp nov	Valid	Wolfe & Tanai	Eocene; Ypresian	Okanagan Highlands; Allenby Formation	Canada; British Columbia		one of three species in the extinct section Torada	
Acer taggarti	sp nov	valid	Wolfe & Tanai	Middle Miocene	Mascall Formation	USA; Oregon		Member of Acer Section Rubra	
Acer taurocursum	sp nov	Valid	Wolfe & Tanai	Late Eocene	Bull Run Flora	USA; Nevada		extinct member of section Rubra	
Acer toradense	sp nov	Valid	Wolfe & Tanai	Eocene; Ypresian	Okanagan Highlands; Klondike Mountain Formation	US; Washington		one of three species in the extinct section Torada	
Acer traini	sp nov	Valid	Wolfe & Tanai	Early to middle Miocene	Trout Creek flora	USACanada		extinct member of section Glabra	
Acer washingtonense	Sect and sp nov	Valid	Wolfe & Tanai	Eocene; Ypresian	Okanagan Highlands; Klondike Mountain Formation	US; Washington		type species in the extinct section Torada	
Acer whitebirdense	Comb nov	Valid	(Ashlee) Wolfe & Tanai	Middle Miocene	White Bird Flora	USA; Idaho		member of Acer section Rubra	
Barghoornia	gen et sp nov	Valid	Wolfe & Wehr	Eocene; Ypresian	Okanagan Highlands; Klondike Mountain Formation	US; Washington		A burseraceous genus The type species is B. oblongifolia	Barghoornia oblongifolia
Bohlenia	gen et comb nov	Valid	Wolfe & Wehr	Eocene; Ypresian	Okanagan Highlands; Klondike Mountain Formation	US; Washington	Comptonia insignis auct. non Lesquereux. Berry, 1929	A sapindaceous genus The type species is Bohlenia americana (1935) (in part); Also includes Bohlenia insignis (1937)	Bohlenia americana
Rhus malloryi	sp nov	Valid	Wolfe & Wehr	Eocene; Ypresian	Okanagan Highlands; Klondike Mountain Formation	US; Washington		A sumac relative Split into four species in 2019	Rhus malloryi

=== incertae sedis ===
Name	Novelty	Status	Authors	Age	Unit	Location	Synonymized taxa	Notes	Images
Princetonia	Gen et sp nov	Valid	Stockey	Eocene; Ypresian	Okanagan Highlands; Princeton Chert	Canada; British Columbia		An angiosperm flower genus of uncertain affiliation. The type species is P. allenbyensis	
Republica	gen, sp, et comb nov	Valid	Wolfe & Wehr	Eocene; Ypresian	Okanagan Highlands; Klondike Mountain Formation	US; Washington		An incertae sedis angiosperm possibly of Hamamelididae affiliations Type species R. hickeyi. Genus also includes Dicotylophyllum kummerensis (1977) and Dicotylophyllum litseafolia (1969)	Republica hickeyi

== Molluscs ==
=== Newly described bivalves ===
Name	Novelty	Status	Authors	Age	Unit	Location	Notes	Images
Tuarangia gravgaerdensis	sp nov	valid	Berg-Madsen	Middle Cambrian	Bornholm	Denmark	second Tuarangia species named	

== Arthropods ==
=== Newly described arachnids ===
Name	Novelty	Status	Authors	Age	Unit	Location	Notes	Images
Attercopus	gen et sp nov	Valid	Shear et al.	Givetian	Gilboa, New York	USA	one of the oldest spiders	

=== Newly described crustaceans ===
Name	Novelty	Status	Authors	Age	Unit	Location	Notes	Images
Homarus morrisi	Sp nov	Valid	Quayle	Ypresian–Bartonian		England		

=== Newly described insects ===
Name	Novelty	Status	Authors	Age	Unit	Location	Notes	Images
Baikuris	Gen et sp nov	Valid	Dlussky	Santonian	Taimyr amber	Russia	A sphecomyrmine ant. Two species B. mandibularis and B. mirabilis	Baikuris mandibularis
Sapho armissani	Sp nov.	Valid	Nel	Stampian	Narbonne Basin	France	A Calopterygid damselfly.	Sapho armissani

== Reptiles ==
=== Archosauromorphs ===
- Stokes suggests that sauropods recycled their gastroliths and chose them based on brightness of color.
- First Argentinosaurus bone found.

==== Newly described dinosaurs ====
Name	Novelty	Status	Authors	Age	Unit	Location	Notes	Images
Aeolosaurus	gen et sp nov	Valid taxon	Powell	Late Cretaceous	Angostura Colorada Formation	Argentina	A titanosaurian	
Aragosaurus	Gen et sp nov	Valid taxon	Sanz, Buscalioni, Casanovas-Cladellas, & Santafé	Hauterivian-Barremian		Spain		
Borogovia	gen et sp nov	Valid taxon	Osmólska	Late Cretaceous		Mongolia		
"Clevelanotyrannus"	gen et sp nov	Nomen nudum	Bakker, Williams & Currie vide: Currie	Late Cretaceous	Lance Formation	USA	determined to be a junior synonym of Nanotyrannus	"Clevelanotyrannus"
"Jiangjunmiaosaurus"	nomen nudum	Anonymous	Middle Jurassic	Shishugou Formation		China	Junior synonym of Monolophosaurus	Monolophosaurus
Maleevus	gen et sp nov	Valid taxon	Tumanova	Late Cretaceous		Mongolia		
Pseudolagosuchus	Gen et sp nov	Valid taxon	Arcucci	Ladinian (Middle Triassic)	Chañares Formation	Argentina	possibly a jr synonym of Lewisuchus	
Ugrosaurus	gen et sp nov	Junior synonym	Cobabe & David Fastovsky	Late Cretaceous	Hell Creek Formation	USA	Junior synonym of Triceratops	Triceratops
"Unicerosaurus"		Nomen nudum	Baugh vide: Armstrong		Glen Rose, Texas?	USA	Possibly a Fish neural spine, never formally described	
Walkeria	gen et sp nov	name preoccupied	Chatterjee	Late Triassic	Maleri Formation	India	Name preoccupied by a bryozoan. Renamed Alwalkeria in 1994.	Alwalkeria

=== Newly named birds ===
Name	Status	Novelty	Authors	Age	Unit	Location	Notes	Images
Aenigmavis sapea	jr synonym	Gen et sp. nov.	Peters	Middle Eocene	Messel pit	Germany	An Ameghinornithidae, jr synonym of Strigogyps sapea. it is the type species of the genus Aenigmavis Peters, 1987.	
Aythya chauvirae	Valid	Sp nov.	Cheneval	Middle Miocene		France	An Anatidae.	
Calcardea junnei	Valid	Gen et sp nov.	Gingerich	Early Eocene	Wilwood Formation	USA	Monotypic with C. junnei. Originally classified as a member of Ardeidae; this interpretation was rejected by Mayr, Gingerich & Smith (2019), who considered this bird to be a member of Telluraves, and claimed that it resembled parrot-like taxon Vastanavis.	
Carduelis triasi	Valid	Sp nov.	Alcover & Florit	Late Pleistocene-Holocene	La Palma	Canary Islands	A Fringillidae, Carduelinae.	
Dromaius gidju	jr synonym	Sp nov.	Patterson & Vickers Rich	Middle Miocene	Wipajiri Formation	Australia	A Dromaiidae, jr synonym of Emuarius gidju.	
Ducula david	Valid	Sp. nov.	Balouet & Olson	Holocene	Uvea	Wallis and Futuna	A Columbidae.	
Eoglaucidium pallas	Valid	Gen et sp nov.	Fischer	Middle Eocene	Messel pit & Geiseltal	Germany	A Sandcoleid, monotypic with E. pallas.	
Janipes nymphaeobates	Valid	Gen et sp nov.	Rasmussen, Olson, & Simons	Early Oligocene	Jebel Qatrani Formation	Egypt	A Jacanidae, monotypic with J. nymphaeobates	
Juncitarsus merkeli	Valid	Sp. nov.	Dieter S. Peters	Middle Eocene	Messel pit	Germany	A Juncitarsid	
Necrobyas medius	jr synonym	Sp. nov.	Mourer-Chauviré	Eocene or Oligocene	Phosphorites du Quercy	France	A Tytonid, transferred to Prosybris medius in 1998.	
Nupharanassa	Valid	Gen et sp. nov.	Rasmussen, Olson, & Simons	Early Oligocene	Jebel Qatrani Formation	Egypt	A Jacanidae, two species N. bulotorum and N. tolutaria.	
Otis khosatzkii	Valid	Sp. nov.	Bocheński & Kurochkin	Late Pliocene		Moldova	An Otidid	
Otis paratetrax	Valid	Sp nov.	Bocheński & Kurochkin	Late Pliocene		Moldova; Ukraine	An Otididae.	
Palaeoalectoris	Valid	Gen et sp nov.	Hou	Argonian	Xiacaowan Formation	China	A Threskiornithid, monotypic with P. songlinensis.	
Palaeobyas	Valid	Gen et sp nov.	Mourer-Chauviré	Eocene or Oligocene	Phosphorites du Quercy	France	A Sophiornithid, monotypic with P. cracrafti.	
Palaeoglaux	Valid	Gen et sp nov.	Mourer-Chauviré	Late Eocene		France	A Palaeoglaucid, monotypic with P. perrierensis.	
Palaeotyto cadurcensis	Valid	Gen et sp nov.	Mourer-Chauviré	Eocene or Oligocene	Phosphorites du Quercy,	France	A Sophiornithid, monotypic with P. cadurcensis.	
Petralca austriaca	Valid	Gen et sp nov.	Mlíkovský	Late Oligocene & Early Miocene		Austria	Monotypic with P. austriaca. Originally thought to be an auk; Göhlich & Mayr (2018) reinterpreted it as a member of Gaviiformes.	
Platalea tiangangensis	Valid	Sp. nov.	Hou	Argonian	Xiacaowan Formation	China	A Phasianid.	
Prefica	Valid	Gen et sp nov.	Olson	Early Eocene	Green River Formation	USA	A Steatornithidae, Preficinae, monotypic with P. nivea	
Sophiornis	Valid	Gen et sp nov.	Mourer-Chauviré	Eocene or Oligocene	Phosphorites du Quercy	France	A Sophiornithid, monotypic with S. quercynus	
Vini sinotoi	Valid	Sp. nov.	Steadman & Zarriello	Holocene	Ua Huka; Hiva Oa; Tahuata	French Polynesia	A Psittacidae, Loriinae.	
Vini vidivici	Valid	Sp. nov.	Steadman & Zarriello	Holocene	Tahuata	French Polynesia	A Psittacidae, Loriinae.	
Tytthostonyx glauconiticus	Valid	Gen et sp nov.	Olson & Parris,	Maastrichtian	Hornerstown Formation	USA	A Tytthostonychid, monotypic with T. glauconiticus	
Xenerodiopus	Valid	Gen et sp nov.	Rasmussen, Olson, & Simons	Early Oligocene	Jebel Qatrani Formation	Egypt	A Xenerodiopid, monotypic with X. mycter	

==== Pterosaurs ====
Name	Status	Authors		Age	Unit	Location	Notes
Arambourgiania	Gen nov	Valid	Nesov, Kanznyshkina, & Cherepanov	Maastrichtian		Jordan	New generic name for "Titanopteryx philadelphiae"
Tropeognathus	Gen et sp nov	jr synonym?	Wellnhofer	Cenomanian	Santana Formation	Brazil	possibly a jr synonym of Ornithocheirus

== Synapsids ==
=== Mammals ===
Name	Novelty	Status	Authors	Age	Unit	Location	Notes	Images
Propoecilogale	Gen. nov	Valid	Petter	Late Pliocene-Early Pleistocene	Bolt's Farm	South Africa	A mustelid, type species is P. bolti originally named as Ictonyx bolti in 1985.	
