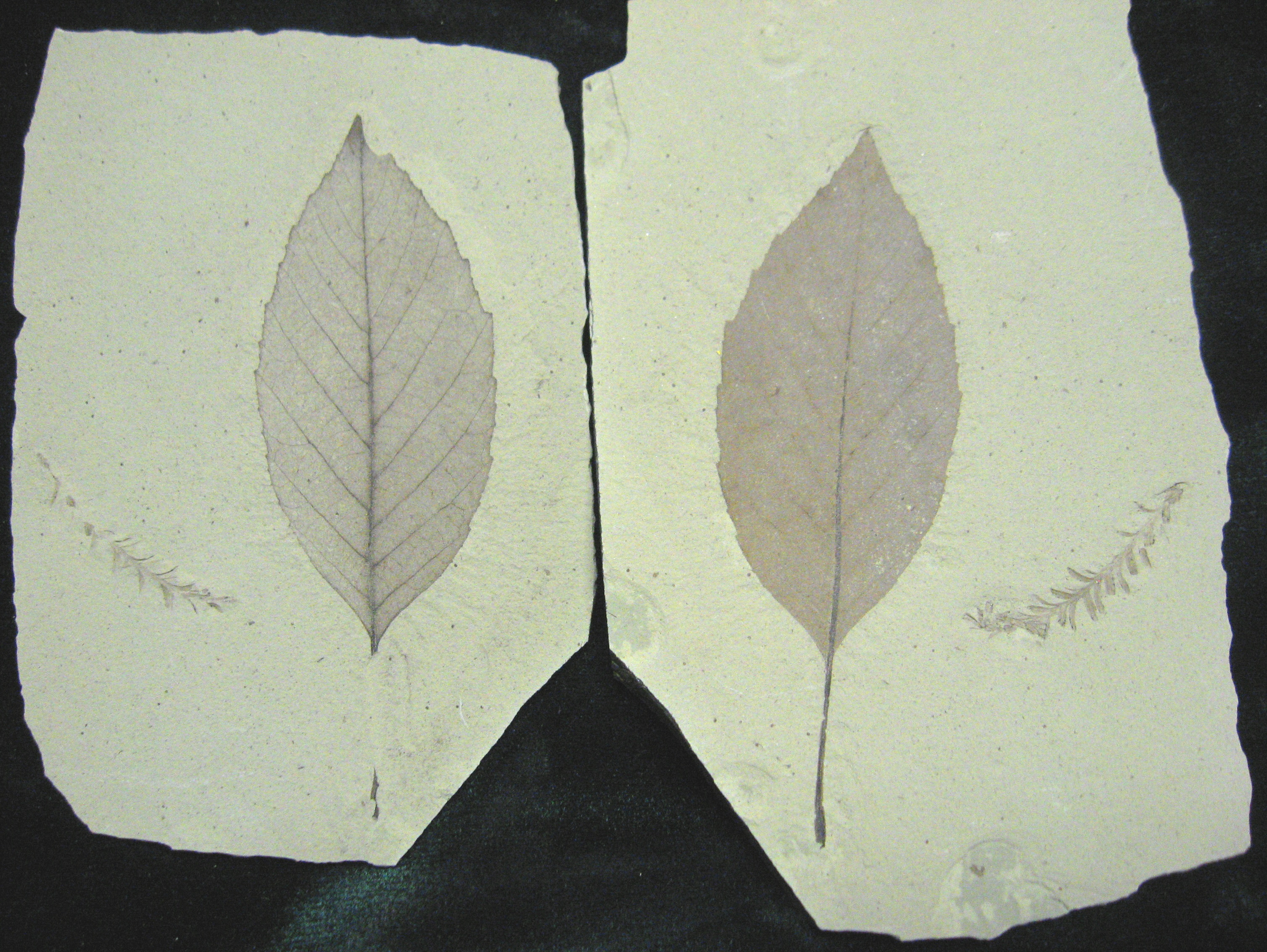
- Alnus parvifolia fossil

Scientific classification
- Kingdom: Plantae
- Clade: Tracheophytes
- Clade: Angiosperms
- Clade: Eudicots
- Clade: Rosids
- Order: Fagales
- Family: Betulaceae
- Genus: Alnus
- Subgenus: Alnus subg. Alnus
- Species: †A. parvifolia

Binomial name
- †Alnus parvifolia (Berry) Wolfe & Wehr

Synonyms
- Alnus corralina auct. non Lesquereux. Brown, 1937 (part); Alnus elliptica Berry, 1929; Betula parvifolia Berry, 1926; Carpinus grandis auct. non Unger. Berry, 1926 (part)

= Alnus parvifolia =

Alnus parvifolia Temporal range: Ypresian

Extinct species of flowering plant

Alnus parvifolia was an extinct species of flowering plant in the family Betulaceae related to the modern birches. The species is known from fossil leaves and possible fruits found in early Eocene sites of northern Washington state, United States, and central British Columbia, Canada.

== History and classification ==
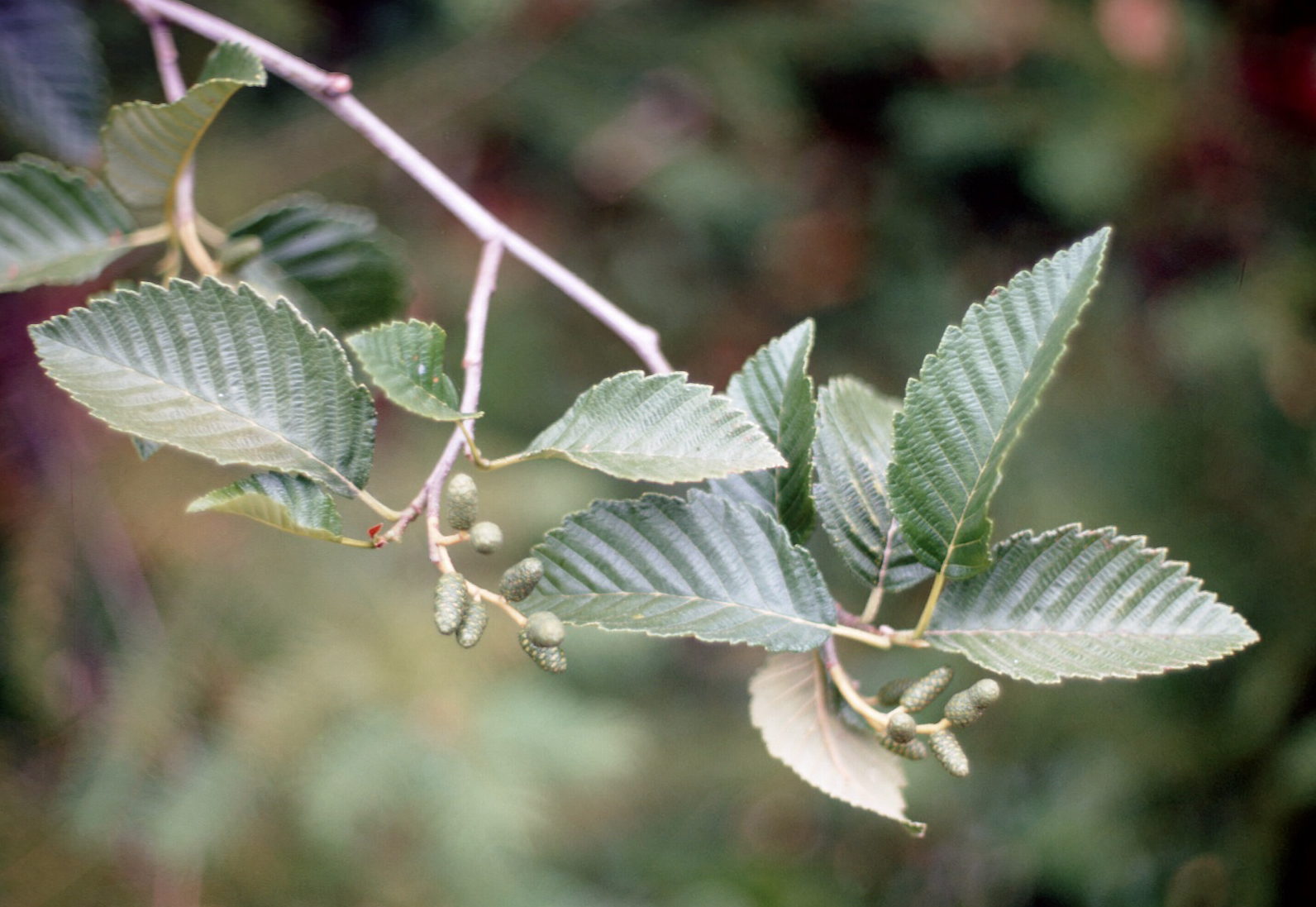
Alnus incana subsp. tenuifolia California, US

A series of leaves was collected during geological mapping of the North Thompson River region by William Uglow in 1921. Of the areas visited, the Joseph Creek and Newhykulston sites in the Chu Chua District produced a number of fossils which were examined and described by Edward Berry in 1926 Geological Survey of Canada bulletin. Berry grouped the Chu Chua betulaceous leaves into three new species and five already named species. A group of leaves from the Chu Chua Formation's Joseph Creek locality were described as the new species Betula parvifolia, which was noted to be "not uncommon" at the site. Berry did not give any explanation for the species name parvifolia in his paper, only noting that the leaves were not similar to any Betula forms he was familiar with and suggested a single leaf from fossiliferous rocks in what is now the Kitsilano neighborhood of Vancouver, British Columbia, might also belong to the species. In the name paper he placed a series of leaves from the Darlington Creek and Joseph Creek sites into the Miocene European species "Carpinus grandis" while specifically noting the taxon at that time was a catchall, with no true uniting features between the fossils of various localities which had been referred to the species.

Three years after the initial description of the Chu Chua belutaceous species, Berry published a monographic revision of the Latah Formation of eastern Washington and Northern Idaho. At that time, Berry incorrectly assumed the Klondike Mountain Formation fossils of Republic, Washington. were a northern outcrop of the Latah Formation, and as such, treated them in the same paper as conspecific with the Latah material. Among the descriptions, he named a new alder species, Alnus elliptica from a series of small leaves, and likened the leaves to modern Alnus alnobetula var. crispa. One additional leaf from Republic was placed into "Prunus rustii", a species named from Latah Formation fossils three years earlier. Seven years later, Roland W. Brown reassessed a number of fossils from across the western United States, including the Prunus rustii leaf, which he moved to Alnus corallina. Brown noted the secondaries of the Republic specimen run straight from the mainvein to the margin and terminate in the marginal teeth, with a vein fork to the tooth the one being supplied by the secondary.

Included in the monograph on Republic dicots published by Jack A. Wolfe and Wesley Wehr in 1987 was a reassessment of "Betula" parvifolia based on additional fossils collected in the late 1970s through early 1980s by Wolfe, Wehr, and Kirk Johnson. Based on the expanded series of fossils, Wolfe and Wehr concluded the taxon was a species of alder rather than birch, and renamed it Alnus parvifolia. They also included Alnus elliptica plus portions of the fossils that had previously been identified as "Carpinus grandis" by Berry and Alnus corallina by Brown. Additionally they included the species Alnus cuprovallis described by Daniel I. Axelrod (1966) in the expanded A. parvifolia as well, however this synonymy was rejected by Axelrod in his 1998 revision of Eocene age Thunder Mountain flora in Idaho.

A. parvifolia has been placed into the living alder subgenus Alnus subg. Alnus and is suggested to be related closest to the living Alnus incana of western North America.

== Distribution and paleoenvironment ==
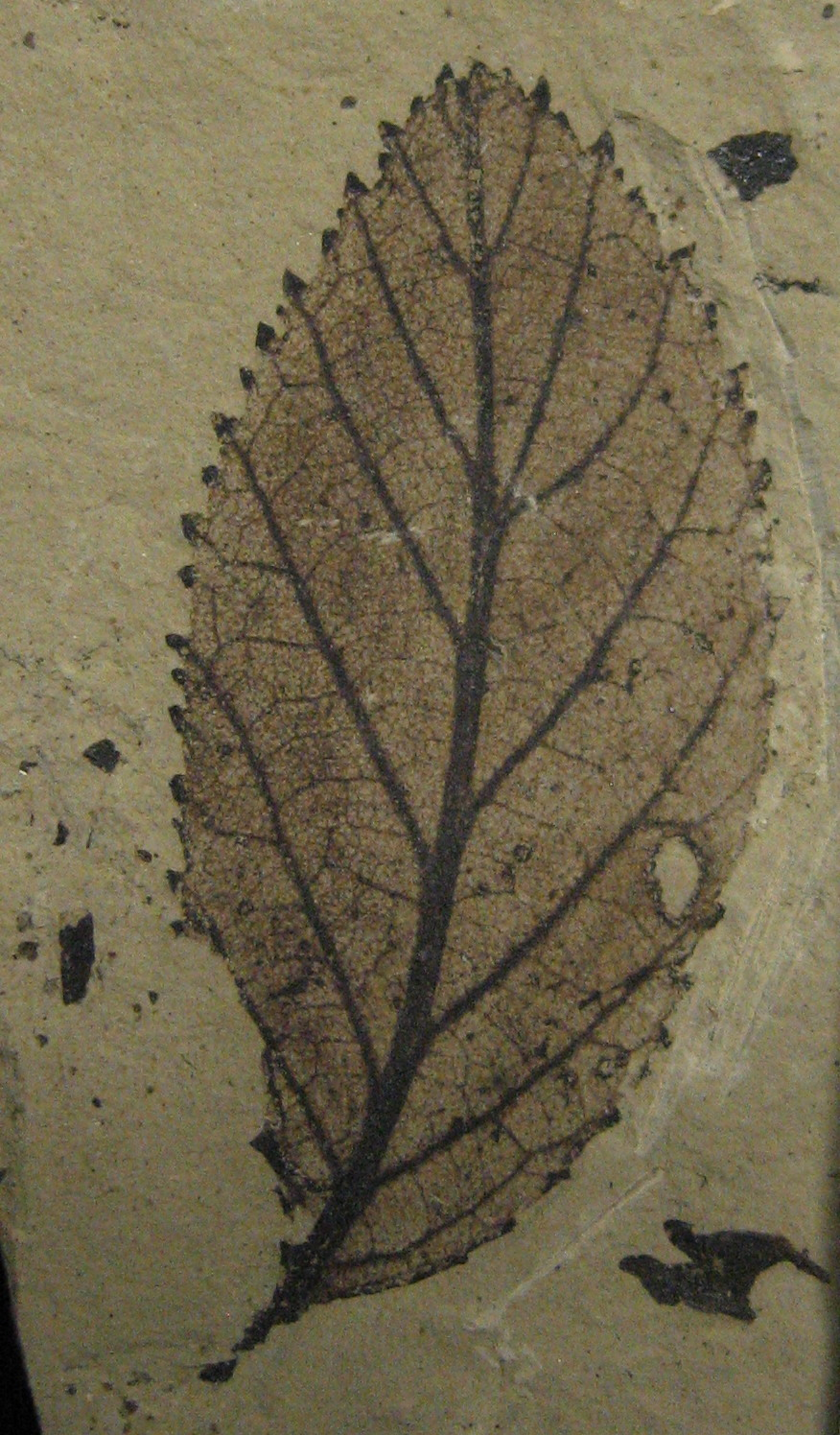
"Alnus elliptica" type small leaf

Alnus parvifolia has been found in various formations that comprise the Eocene Okanagan Highlands. Apart from the Chu Chua Formation, the species has been reported from the Kamloops Groups Tranquille Formation at Falkland and McAbee plus the Coldwater Beds Quilchena site. Of the southern-most Okanagan Highlands sites, both the Klondike Mountain Formation and Allenby Formation around Princeton, British Columbia, have A. parvifolia leaves and fruiting bodies. Alnus has been reported at both of the two northern Okanagan Highlands localities, the Driftwood Shales near Smithers and Horsefly Shales near Horsefly. However the leaves, fruits, and pollen from these two sites have not been identified to species.

The highlands, including the Eocene formations between Driftwood canyon and Republic, have been described as one of the "Great Canadian Lagerstätten" based on the diversity, quality and unique nature of the floral and faunal biotas that are preserved. The highlands temperate biome, preserved across a large transect of lakes, recorded many of the earliest appearances of modern genera, while also documenting the last stands of ancient lines. The warm temperate highland floras in association with downfaulted lacustrine basins and active volcanism are noted to have no exact modern equivalents, however they have been compared to the upland ecological islands in the Virunga Mountains within the Albertine Rift of the African rift valley.

In his unpublished 1996 PhD thesis, Patrick Fields suggested that Eocene age Alnus leaves from the area of Salmon, Idaho, are also Alnus parvifolia, citing age and morphological similarity to published specimens from Republic. However the taxonomic changes suggested by Fields were never published officially and thus the inclusion is only hypothetical.

== Paleoecology ==
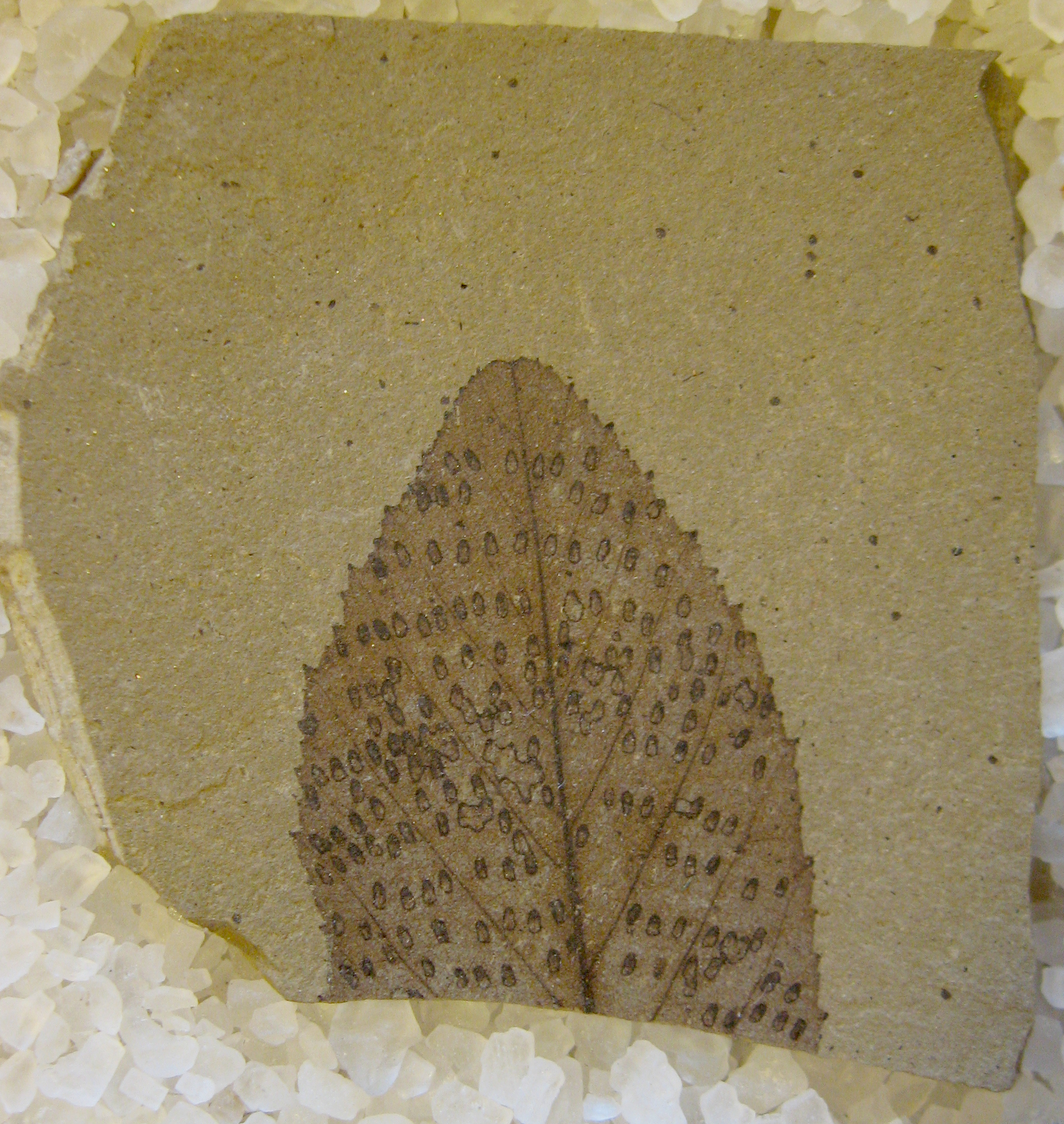
Paleoovoidus species oviposition trace fossils on A. parvifolia leaf

Greenwood et al (2016) noted Alunus parvifolia to be the most common dicot fossil of the Klondike Mountain Formation and this is similarly true at Falkland where it is found in all three identified shale units, and likely was an important post-disturbance colonizer plant and nitrogen fixer. Royer et al. (2007) used A. parvifolia as a model species for study of fossil leaf economics, the combined traits of nutrient concentration, rate of photosynthesis, individual leaf lifespan, and palatability for herbivores. The results indicated the leaves were likely fast growing and had a thin leaf blade, as was expected for an upland temperate species.

In 1991 an Alnus parvifolia leaf from the Burke Museum collections was briefly described by Standley Lewis and Mark Carroll. They reported the presence of numerous insect eggs on the leaf blade, and attributed them to leaf beetles of the family Chrysomelidae. Noting that the curving linear rows of eggs were similar to those seen occasionally in oviposition by Altica genus flea beetles, they ascribed the fossils to the genus, suggesting them to be the first fossil evidence for Altica in the North American Eocene.

Attribution of the trace fossils to Altica was brought into question by Conrad Labandeira (2002) as part of his initial report on the insect–plant interactions preserved in Klondike Mountain Formation fossils. He wrote that while Altica species eggs are rarely deposited in linear fashion, much more often they are clusters of eggs on the leaf surface, and never in echeloned arcs of eggs below the surface as seen in Republic and McAbee fossils. Labandeira suggested that the oviposition was performed by Coenagrionid family damselflies, as they are found on a wide range of leaves that would have been present near the lake shore. Additionally the robust ovipositor of damselflies would leave a distinct scarring around the egg insertion site, a phenomenon shown in the fossils. The Republic fossils were referred to the ichnogenus Paleoovoidus by Sarzetti et al. (2009), but the researchers did not place them to a specific ichnospecies.

In addition to Paleoovoidus species trace fossils, Labandeira (2002) also documented hole feeding on an A. parvifolia which he attributed as likely caused by adult Chrysomelidae beetles. The feeding took place between the secondary veins and meandered towards the main vein from its starting point in the mid-region of the leaf blade. Hole and margin feeding from an unidentified insect group on a leaf showed rims of reaction tissue, and a flap of necrotic leaf blade.

== Description ==
In his 1926 description of the new species "Betula" parvifolia, Berry noted the leaves to vary in both size and shape, though overall small. The range of form grades from elliptical through orbicular and have rounded bases and apexes. The sizes noted to range between 2.25–3.75 cm (0.89–1.48 in) and have widths between 1.5–2.6 cm (0.59–1.02 in) with the widest point of the leaf blades midway up the leaf. Petioles, where preserved, were deemed "stout", with a curved length that ranged between 4–8 mm (0.16–0.31 in). The leaf margins were noted to have small, evenly spaced teeth with only the area near the petiole being smooth. Each leaf had between seven and eight pairs of secondary veins branching off the thick primary vein. They extended fully to the leaf margin, forking near the apical end to give rise to a tertiary vein from the basal side.

Three years later, Berry's 1929 description of Alnus elliptica defined the elliptical leaves as 1.5–2.5 cm (0.59–0.98 in) long and 9–14 mm (0.35–0.55 in) wide with a very stout petiole averaging 4 mm (0.16 in) long. The margin showed closely spaced crenate teeth. Sub-parallelly branching off from the stout midvein at 45° angles, the regularly spaced secondaries extend to the margins along an almost fully straight path. None of the specimens showed well-preserved tertiaries.
