= Prehistoric Journey =

1995 non-fiction book

Prehistoric Journey: A History of Life on Earth
- Authors: Kirk R. Johnson; Richard Stucky
- Language: English
- Genre: Reference
- Publisher: Denver Museum of Natural History and Roberts Rinehart
- Publication date: November 1, 1995
- Pages: 144 pp
- ISBN: 1-55591-553-1
- OCLC: 62118347
- Dewey Decimal: 560 22
- LC Class: QE28.3 .J64 2006

Prehistoric Journey: A History of Life on Earth is a 1995 non-fiction book by Kirk R. Johnson and Richard Stucky. It was published by the Denver Museum of Natural History and Roberts Rinehart.

== Reception ==
In a positive review, School Library Journal reviewer Catherine Noonan wrote, "What makes this such a terrific book, especially for students, is the format. The illustrations are splendidly done; at least one picture on every page features the topic at hand in vivid detail. Brilliant photographs and beautifully rendered watercolors evoke the present and past environments." American Scientist reviewer Yixin Gu called it "a terrific book" with "excellent pictures and drawings" that "brings students on an attractive journey to the prehistoric world".

Charles C. James of Science Teacher stated, "Written for an adult audience, this book's comprehensive nature and visual presentation make it equally suitable for a K–12 audience." American Scientist reviewers Philip and Phylis Morrison praised the book for having "eloquent witness of photography, heightened by artists' colorful and careful conjectures". They concluded, "There are bigger albums of tossils than this slim volume, and well-done studies of this or that ancient site, but this book nicely integrates the story of life's variety and the landscapes where traces of ancient creatures survive."
