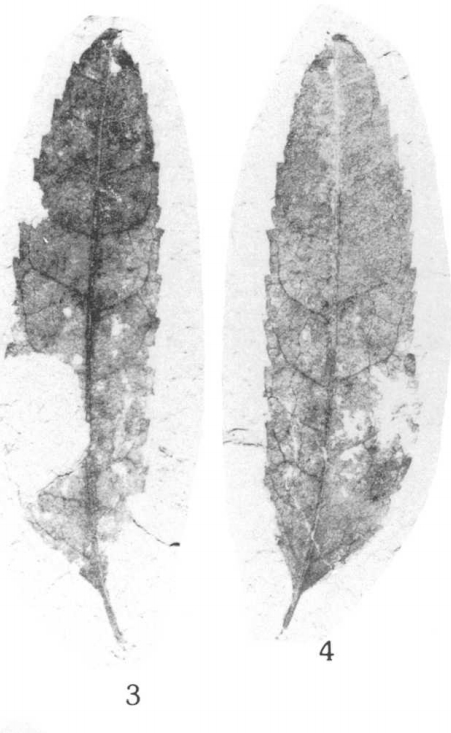
- B. oblongifolia, from Wolfe & Wehr 1987

Scientific classification
- Kingdom: Plantae
- Clade: Tracheophytes
- Clade: Angiosperms
- Clade: Eudicots
- Clade: Rosids
- Order: Sapindales
- Family: Burseraceae
- Genus: †Barghoornia; Wolfe & Wehr
- Species: †B. oblongifolia

Binomial name
- †Barghoornia oblongifolia Wolfe & Wehr

= Barghoornia =

Extinct species of flowering plants

Barghoornia is an extinct genus of flowering plants in the family Burseraceae containing the solitary species Barghoornia oblongifolia. The species is known from fossil leaves found in the early Eocene deposits of northern Washington state, United States.

== History and classification ==
Barghoornia oblongifolia was described from a single type specimen, a leaf, the holotype being USNM 32695 A&B, in the paleobotanical collections of Smithsonians National Museum of Natural History. Working from this specimen, collected in the Republic, Washington, area in the early 1980s, the fossil was studied by Jack A. Wolfe, then of the University of California and Northwest School artist and Wesley Wehr, affiliate paleobotany curator of the Burke Museum. They published their 1987 type description for the genus and species in a United States Geological Survey monograph on the North Eastern Washington dicot fossils. The generic name Barghoornia is a patronym recognizing Elso Barghoorn for the enormous contributions to paleobotanical understanding, ranging from the Quaternary to the Precambrian. Wolfe and Wehr did not give an etymology for the specific epithet oblongifolia.

Based on the asymmetry of the leaf, secondary venation, and probability of the genus being pinnately compound Wolfe and Wehr suggested Barghoornia to be affiliated with the "Rosidae" clade. The distinct semicraspedodromous secondary venation, with the secondaries curving near the margin to connect with the next most apical secondary, while also forking with the external vein branch terminating at the margin, the family Burseraceae was noted as the only family with the same combination of features. While five Burseraceae genera have semicraspedodromous venation, none of them have matching tertiary vein structure to Barghoornia, which most closely mimics the structure seen in the genus Bursera. However Bursera has differing teeth that are more coarse, and craspedodromous secondaries that lack the forked vein curving upwards to the next secondary. As such Wolfe and Wehr placed Barghoornia in Burseraceae with confidence.

== Distribution and paleoecology ==
Barghoornia oblongifolia fossils have been recovered from a single location in the Okanagan highlands, an outcrop of the early Eocene, Ypresian Klondike Mountain Formation in Republic. The formation preserves an upland lake system surrounded by a mixed conifer–broadleaf forest with nearby volcanism. The pollen flora has notable elements of birch and golden larch, and distinct trace amounts of fir, spruce, cypress, and palm. Wolfe and Tanai (1987) interpreted the forest climate to have been microthermal, having distinct seasonal temperature swings which dipped below freezing in the winters. However further study has shown the lake system was surrounded by a warm temperate ecosystem that likely had a mesic upper microthermal to lower mesothermal climate, in which winter temperatures rarely dropped low enough for snow, and which were seasonably equitable. The Okanagan highlands paleoforest surrounding the lakes have been described as precursors to the modern temperate broadleaf and mixed forests of Eastern North America and Eastern Asia. Based on the fossil biotas the lakes were higher and cooler than the coeval coastal forests preserved in the Puget Group and Chuckanut Formation of Western Washington, which are described as lowland tropical forest ecosystems. Estimates of the paleoelevation range between 0.7–1.2 km (0.43–0.75 mi) higher than the coastal forests. This is consistent with the paleoelevation estimates for the lake systems, which range between 1.1–2.9 km (1,100–2,900 m), which is similar to the modern elevation 0.8 km (0.50 mi), but higher.

Estimates of the mean annual temperature for the Klondike Mountain Formation have been derived from climate leaf analysis multivariate program (CLAMP) analysis and leaf margin analysis (LMA) of the Republic paleoflora. The CLAMP results after multiple linear regressions for Republic gave a mean annual temperature of approximately 8.0 °C (46.4 °F), while the LMA gave 9.2 ± 2.0 °C (48.6 ± 3.6 °F). This is lower than the mean annual temperature estimates given for the coastal Puget Group, which is estimated to have been between 15–18.6 °C (59.0–65.5 °F). The bioclimatic analysis for Republic suggests mean annual precipitation amounts of 115 ± 39 cm (45 ± 15 in).

== Description ==
Wolfe and Wehr (1987) described the holotype fossil as a single leaflet from a larger compound leaf noting the distinct asymmetry of the fossil in the base and midportions of the lamina. The leaflet has a 7 mm (0.28 in) petiolule connecting to the acute leaf base, while the narrow oblong leaflet has a serrate margin and terminates in an acute tip. The teeth are simple with pointed tips, angular sinuses and irregular spacing, generally with two teeth per secondary vein. The leaflet is pinnately veined with a main vein that is off center in the base and middle sections of the leaf before centering in the apical section. The eight pairs of secondary veins are semicraspedodromous with the basal veins branching from the main vein at a 70° angle and the remaining seven pairs branching out at 80° angles. Each of the secondaries in the lower seven pairs run straight towards the margin before curving sharply upwards in a loop to combine with the next most apical secondary. The marginal secondary forks run straight to the margin and terminate in either a tooth, which the veins enter centrally to apically, or in the tooth sinus. The tertiary venation running between the secondaries and the main vein form a coarse orthogonal reticulate structure, in which the quaternaries form quadrilateral to polygonal areolae.
