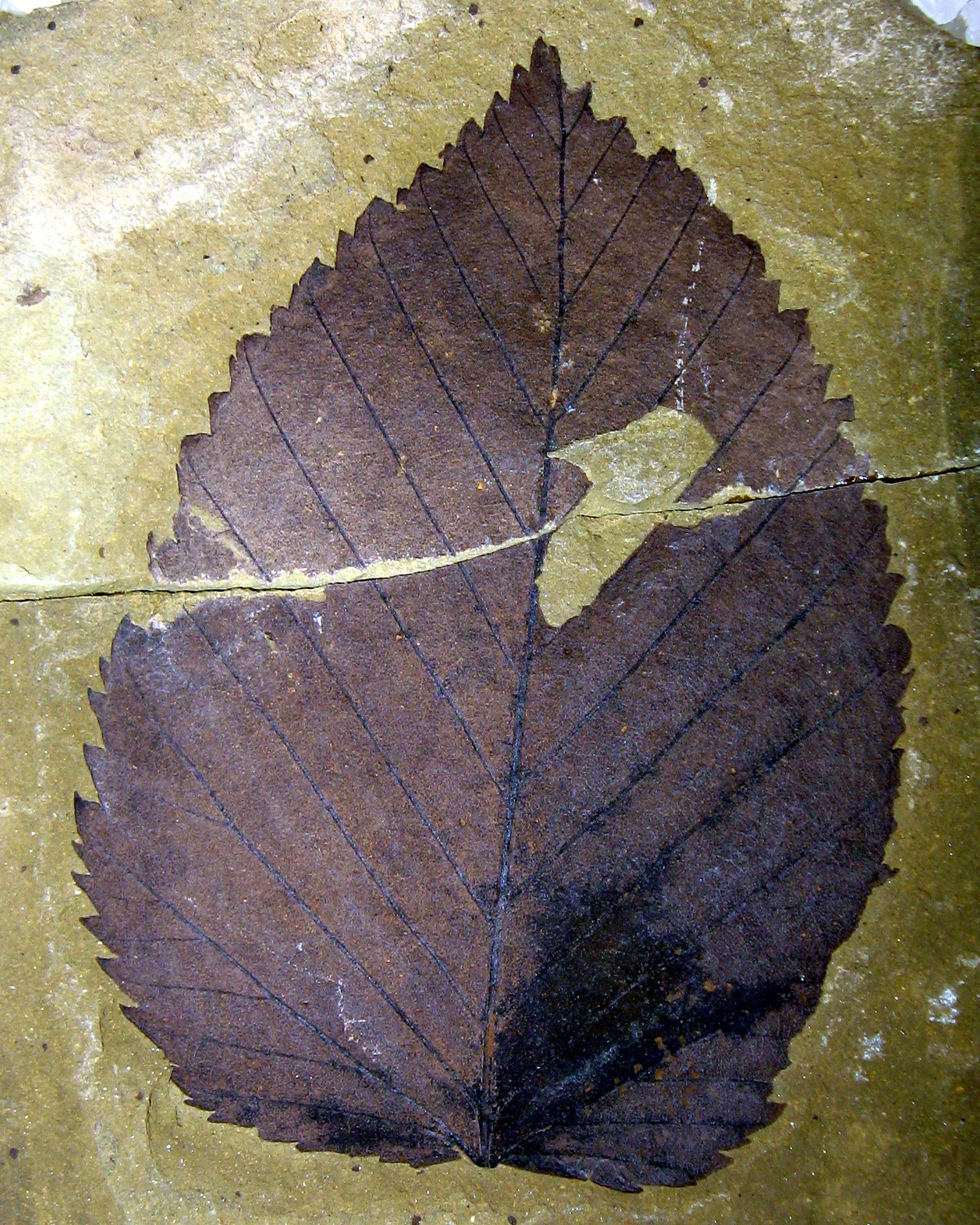
- T. davidiifolia fossil leaf

Scientific classification
- Kingdom: Plantae
- Clade: Tracheophytes
- Clade: Angiosperms
- Clade: Eudicots
- Clade: Asterids
- Order: Cornales
- Family: Nyssaceae
- Genus: †Tsukada; Wolfe & Wehr
- Species: †T. davidiifolia

Binomial name
- †Tsukada davidiifolia Wolfe & Wehr

= Tsukada davidiifolia =

Extinct species of flowering plant

Tsukada is an extinct genus of flowering plant in the family Nyssaceae related to the modern "dove-tree", Davidia involucrata, containing the single species Tsukada davidiifolia. The genus is known from fossil leaves found in the early Eocene deposits of northern Washington state, United States and a similar aged formation in British Columbia, Canada.

== Discovery ==
Tsukada leaf fossils have been identified from two locations in Western North America, the 49 million year old Klondike Mountain Formation near Republic, Washington and at the One Mile Creek locality near Princeton, British Columbia. Fossil pollen identified as from the Nyssaceae genus Nyssa has been identified from the related Okanagan Highlands Hat Creek Amber in central British Columbia.

Ages for the Okanagan Highland locations are, in general, Early Eocene, with the sites that have current uranium-lead or argon–argon radiometric dates being of Ypresian age, while the undated sites or those given older dates being possibly slightly younger and Lutetian in age.

== Taxonomy ==
Tsukada was described from a group of type specimen leaves, the holotype UW 71095, along with two paratypes UW 39187 and UW 71081 were part of the paleobotanical collections of Burke Museum. Additionally the counterpart to specimen UW 39187 was preserved in the University of California Museum of Paleontology collection as UCMP 9302. Working from these specimens, collected in the Republic, Washington area in the early 1980s, the fossils were studied by Jack A. Wolfe of the University of California and Wesley C. Wehr of the Burke Museum. They published their 1987 type description for the genus and species in a United States Geological Survey monograph on the North Eastern Washington dicot fossils.

The genus name Tsukada was coined as a patronym recognizing the Quaternary paleoecology and biogeography work of University of Washington palynologist Matsuo Tsukada. The specific epithet was not explained by Wolfe and Wehr.

Tertiary leaf veins of Tsukada branch in an angled-opposite system, distinct from that of the "dove tree", Davidia involucrata, where the tertiary vein system is formed from right angle-right angle branching. Additionally the side bracing veins are looped in Tsukada, while those in D. involucrata are straight and more robust. The glands of the teeth in Tsukada are shorter and less distinct. Wolfe and Wehr noted some aspects of the leaf structure, such as the tertiary vein structure and occasional camptodromus secondary branches, are seen in the family Escalloniaceae and not in other Cornales species. They suggested that if Tsukada were of "low grade leaf morphology" to Davidia then the two genera might have been closer in relation to Escalloniaceae than to the Cornales. However molecular phylogeny in the years after Wolfe and Wehrs description of Tsukada has shown Davidia to be a member of the Cornales, and placed in to the family Nyssaceae.

At least one fossil from the One Mile Creek flora has a distinct fossil insect gall on the leaf midrib. The ovoid gall has multiple chambers and several circular exit holes along its margin. There have not been recorded galls on specimens of the living Davidia. The galls are most similar to those of the Cecidomyiidae gall midges, and its suggested the gall was caused by a cecidomyiid species.

== Description ==
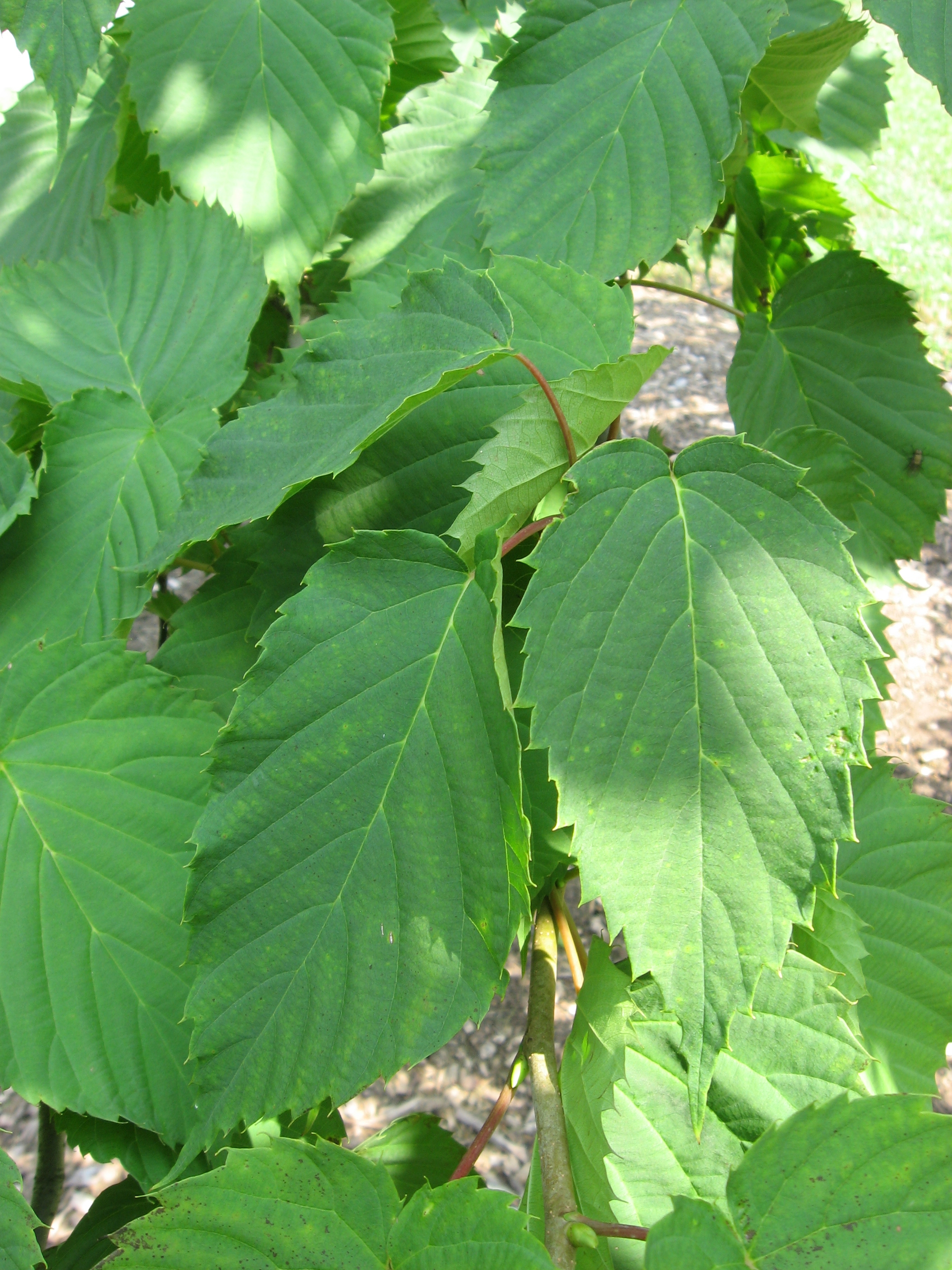
Leaves of Davidia involucrata

Leaves of Tsukada have a simple pinnate vein structure, with secondary veins that are craspedodromous, reaching all the way to the leaf margins. There are no intersecondary veins crossing between the major secondary veins, while the tertiary veins run at acute angles to the secondary veins with some of the tertiary veins branching. The quaternary vein structure has an overall reticulated patterning that forms generally four sided areolae. The margin of the leaves is toothed, with at least one tooth to each secondary vein reaching the margin. The teeth are entered by a secondary vein near the middle and the tips of the teeth show an indistinct glandular region at the tip. There are six pairs of secondary veins, with each pair branching from the middle primary vein at approximately a 45° angle. The veins each curve broadly from the primary vein towards the leaf margin and, with the exception of the basal secondary pair, forking once from the lower side of the vein. The veins that fork from the secondaries angling out to the margin as a craspedodromous vein that reaches the margin, or as a camptodromous vein that curves right before reaching the margin. The basal secondary vein pair is weakly formed, angling off the primary vein at an 80° angle and each have seven external veins branching off the basal side. The petiole of the leaf is slightly cordate, being bracketed on each side by the leaf blade.
