= Acer lincolnense =

Acer lincolnense Temporal range: Late Eocene

Scientific classification
- Kingdom: Plantae
- Clade: Tracheophytes
- Clade: Angiosperms
- Clade: Eudicots
- Clade: Rosids
- Order: Sapindales
- Family: Sapindaceae
- Genus: Acer
- Species: †A. lincolnense

Binomial name
- †Acer lincolnense Wolfe & Tanai, 1987

Extinct species of maple

Acer lincolnense is an extinct maple species in the family Sapindaceae described from a group of fossil leaves and fruits. The species is known from Eocene sediments exposed in the US state of Montana. It is tentatively placed into the living Acer section Cissifolia.

== History and classification ==
Acer lincolnense is represented by a fossil specimens that were recovered from a late Eocene, possibly Chadronian aged, outcrop of the Beaver Creek flora in Central western Montana. Although it is located north of the Ruby Flora, which outcrops in southwest Montana, the similarities in overall floral composition between the Beaver Creek, Ruby, and other Montana floras are interpreted by Wolfe and Tanai to indicate that the assemblages are coeval in nature. The age of the Ruby flora is considered to range from approximately 38 million years ago to approximately 34 million years ago or as young as 32 million years ago, meaning a probable similar age for the Beaver Creek assemblage.

The fossils were first studied by paleobotanists Jack A. Wolfe of the United States Geological Survey, Denver office and Toshimasa Tanai of Hokkaido University. They determined that fossils belonged to an undescribed Acer species and published their 1987 type description for A. lincolnense in the Journal of the Faculty of Science, Hokkaido University. The etymology of the chosen specific name lincolnense is in recognition of Lincoln County, Montana where the type locality for the species is. At the time of description the A. lincolnense holotype specimen, number UCMP 9311 A & B, along with paratype leaf and paratype fruit were part of the University of California Museum of Paleontology collections. In addition to A. lincolnense, the Beaver Creek assemblage had five additional Acer species in 1987; Acer castorrivularis, Acer florissanti, Acer milleri, Acer salmonense, and Acer tiffneyi.

A. lincolnense has leaf and fruit morphologies that Wolfe and Tanai considered similar to both Acer section Negundo and Acer section Cissifolia. The modification of the leaves into three leaflets due to deep lobation that reaches the primary vein is seen in both sections. A. lincolnense differs from extant members of those sections in that the leaflets do not attach to the primary vein with a petiole but are sessile with the leaflet base abutting the primary vein. the species is more similar to extant A. sect. Cissifolia in the size of the areoles, the shape of the margin teeth, and the morphology of the leaflet bases. The fruits of A. lincolnense are also closer to A. sect. Cissifolia, being notably curved along the upper margin of the wing, but the undulating wing venation is not seen in either section, rather is most often seen in Acer section Indivisa. Wolfe and Tanai noted they were uncertain of the section placement for A. lincolnense, but had inferred an ancestor of both A. sect. Indivisa and A. sect. Cissifolia lived in North America during the Eocene and A. lincolnense was a possible candidate for that species.

== Description ==
The leaves of A. lincolnense are divided into three leaflets, with the lateral leaflets pinnately veined and ranging between 1.5 and 4.8 cm (0.59 and 1.89 in) in length. The leaflet blades rest against the primary vein of the leaf, lacking petiolules, and have an asymmetric base flaring out on the basal side while remaining narrow on the apical side. Each lateral leaflet has between 5 and 7 secondary veins that alternate between forking near the vein tip before reaching the blade margin, and curving upwards near the tip to join the next secondary vein up. The forking secondary veins brace the sinuses between the teeth on the blade margins. Overall, the teeth of the leaflets are large and simple, though the largest of the teeth have two smaller subsidiary teeth. The terminal leaflets on the type specimens are incomplete, so length and width of them is not known. They have a symmetrical leaflet base that is acute in shape, the blade being an inverted v shape. The leaves have tertiary veins that form either a mix of acute angle-right angle structuring or right angle-right angle structuring with the veins spaced 0.7–1.3 cm (0.28–0.51 in) apart. The quaternary veins form a network of areoles that are irregular polygons. As with other species of Acer the fruits are a samara with a basal nutlet and apical wing. The nutlets are lanceolate in outline with a narrow rounded apex, and a convex basal side. The nutlet is 1.0 cm (0.39 in) long by 0.4 cm (0.16 in) wide, with a 0.4 cm (0.16 in) scar where the fruit attached to a second fruit at an angle of 30°. There is a thick vein running along the apical side of the nutlet and 7 loosely grouped veins running up the outer edge of the wing. The wing is 1.2 cm (0.47 in) long and 0.7 cm (0.28 in) wide with the outer edge broadly curving, and with undulating veins that diverge from each other at angles between 5° and 10°. The veins curve slightly between leaving the proximal vascular group and reaching the inner wing margin, forking along the way.
