= Acer rousei =

Acer rousei Temporal range: Ypresian

Scientific classification
- Kingdom: Plantae
- Clade: Tracheophytes
- Clade: Angiosperms
- Clade: Eudicots
- Clade: Rosids
- Order: Sapindales
- Family: Sapindaceae
- Genus: Acer
- Section: †Acer sect. Rousea
- Species: †A. rousei

Binomial name
- †Acer rousei Wolfe & Tanai, 1987

Extinct species of maple

Acer rousei is an extinct maple species in the family Sapindaceae described from a series of isolated fossil samaras. The species is solely known from the Early Eocene sediments exposed in south central British Columbia, Canada adjacent to northeast Washington state in the United States. It is the type species for the extinct monotypic section Rousea.

== Taxonomy ==
Acer rousei was described from two complete fruit specimens which were recovered from outcrops of the early Eocene, Ypresian Allenby Formation exposed near Princeton, British Columbia and an additional three fruits from the Ypresian McAbee Fossil Beds near Cache Creek, British Columbia. The two Allenby Formation specimens were found at the Burke Museum of Natural History and Culture location UWBM B3389, known as the One Mile Creek locality. Both the Allenby Formation and the unnamed formation outcropping at the McAbee Fossil Beds preserve upland temperate floras that were first interpreted as being Microthermal, although further study has shown them to be more mesothermal in nature. The plant community preserved in the Allenby formation is a mixed conifer-broadleaf forest with large pollen elements of birch and golden larch, but also having notable traces of fir and spruce. In contrast the McAbee Fossil Beds site is mostly broadleaf pollen with alder and elm dominating, and may represent a successional forest involving multiple volcanic ash eruptions. The species was known only from the McAbee Fossil Beds and Princeton fossil localities when first described. A. rousei is among a number of Acer species described from the Princeton and related sites by Wolfe and Tanai.

Both the Acer rousei holotype samara, number UWBM 56256 A,B and the paratype UWBM 54107 A,B are currently preserved in the paleobotanical collections housed at the Burke Museum of Natural History and Culture, part of the University of Washington in Seattle. They are from the Allenby Formation. The paratype UBCB 2401 is in the University of British Columbia collections while the paratypes TMP P83.39.586 A,B and TMP P83.39.585 A,B are in the collections of the Royal Tyrrell Museum of Palaeontology in Alberta. The last three paratypes are all from the McAbee Fossil Beds. The specimens were studied by paleobotanists Jack A. Wolfe of the United States Geological Survey, Denver office and Toshimasa Tanai of Hokkaido University. Wolfe and Tanai published their 1987 type description for A. rousei in the Journal of the Faculty of Science, Hokkaido University. The etymology of the chosen specific name rousei is in recognition Glenn Rouse, who supplied Wolfe and Tanai with Eocene fossils of Acer from British Columbia. A. stewarti is the only species assigned to the extinct section Rousea and is designated the type species for the section.

== Description ==
The samaras of A. rousei have two indistinct flanges medially along the notably inflated nutlet. The overall shape of the nutlet is circular to elliptic with the average length of the samara up to 3.2 centimetres (1.3 in) and a wing width of 1.1 centimetres (0.43 in). The paired samaras of the species have a notably high attachment angle of 80° to 90°. While very similar in morphology to species in the modern section Palmata, A. rousei differs in the presence of the flanges on the nutlet and circular to elliptic outline of the nutlet. The wing venation of A. rousei is similar to the modern species A. spicatum and its closely related species. The similarities indicate A. rousei as a possible ancestor to the members of the section Palmata.
