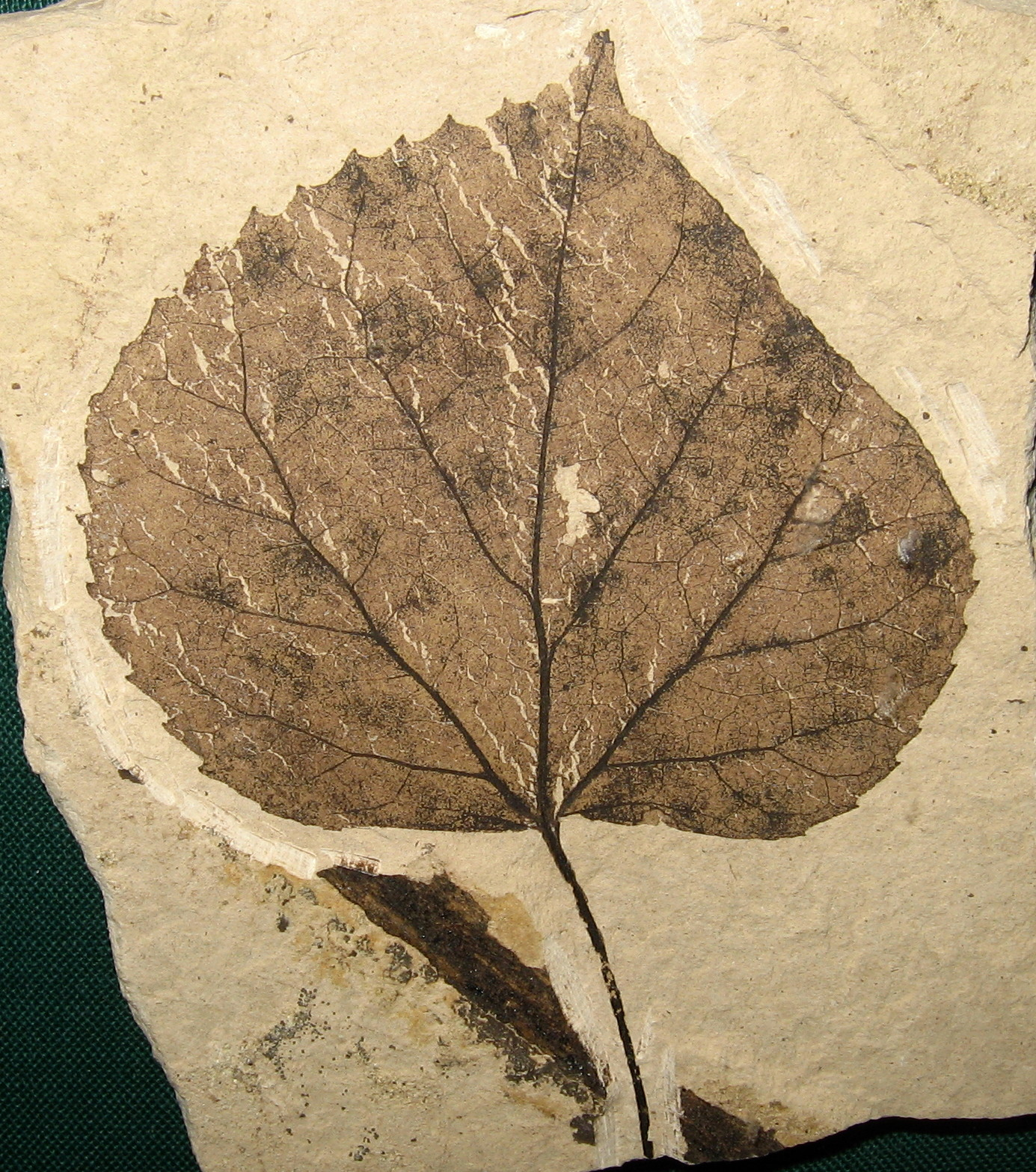
- Fossil leaf of T. johnsoni

Scientific classification
- Kingdom: Plantae
- Clade: Tracheophytes
- Clade: Angiosperms
- Clade: Eudicots
- Clade: Rosids
- Order: Malvales
- Family: Malvaceae
- Genus: Tilia
- Species: †T. johnsoni

Binomial name
- †Tilia johnsoni Wolfe & Wehr

= Tilia johnsoni =

Tilia johnsoni Temporal range: Ypresian

Extinct species of flowering plant

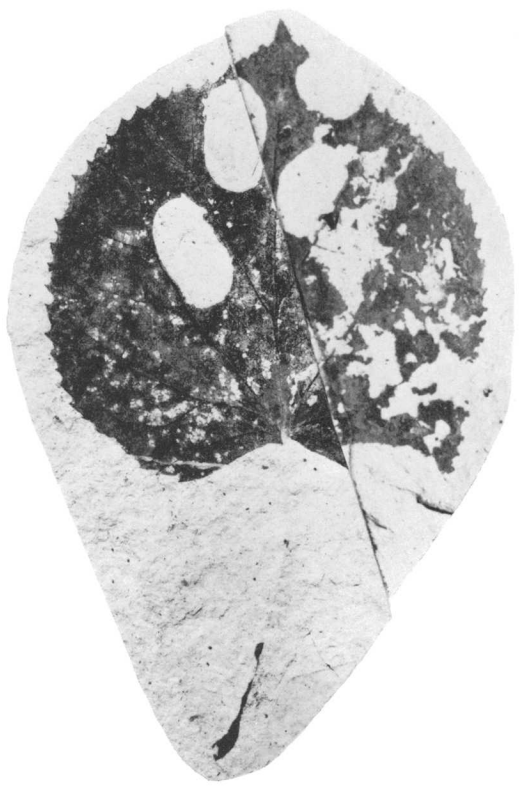
Holotype with herbivory

Tilia johnsoni is an extinct species of flowering plant in the family Malvaceae that, as a member of the genus Tilia, is related to modern lindens (called "limes" in Britain and "basswoods" in the US). The species is known from fossil leaves found in the early Eocene deposits of northern Washington state, United States and a similar aged formation in British Columbia, Canada.

== Distribution ==
Tilia johnsoni leaf fossils have been identified from two locations in the Eocene Okanagan Highlands, the Klondike Mountain Formation near Republic, Washington and at the Quilchena locality near Merritt, British Columbia. Fossil pollen identified as from the genus Tilia has been identified from a greater range of Okanagan Highland fossil sites, having been found in the Allenby Formation near Princeton, British Columbia, at the Falkland fossil site near Falkland, the McAbee Fossil Beds near Kamloops, the Hat Creek Amber and Driftwood Canyon Provincial Park near Smithers. Of the Okanagan Highlands sites, Tilia microfossils and macrofossils have not been identified from the Horsefly fossil beds near the unincorporated community of Horsefly.

The age for the Okanagan Highland locations is uniformly Early Eocene, with the sites that have current uranium-lead or argon–argon radiometric dates being of Ypresian age and corresponding to the Early Eocene Climatic Optimum (EECO). Modern work on the fossil-bearing strata of the Klondike Mountain Formation via radiometrically dating has given an estimated age in the Late Ypresian stage of the early Eocene, between 49.4 ± .5 million years ago at the youngest, and an oldest age estimate of 51.2 ± 0.1 million years ago, given based on detrital zircon isotopic data published in 2021. The Quilchena locality is dated to 51.5 ± 0.4 million years ago, and is reconstructed as the warmest and wettest of the Early Eocene upland sites from the Okanagan Highlands of British Columbia and northern Washington State.

== History and classification ==
Tilia johnsoni was described from a single type specimen, a leaf, the holotype being UW 39712, in the paleobotanical collections of Burke Museum, and its counterpart UCMP 9291 in the University of California Museum of Paleontology in California. Working from this specimen, collected in the Republic, Washington area in the early 1980s, the fossil was studied by Jack A. Wolfe of the University of California and Wesley C. Wehr of the Burke Museum. They published their 1987 type description for the species in a United States Geological Survey monograph on the North Eastern Washington dicot fossils. The specific epithet johnsoni is a patronym recognizing the help provided to Wolfe and Wehr by a young Kirk Johnson, now director of the Smithsonian's National Museum of Natural History. Wolfe and Wehr noted that, at the time of publication, T. johnsoni was the oldest macrofossil occurrence for the genus to be described; older microfossil records of pollen date near to the Paleocene – Eocene boundary, and fruits of an extinct Tilia relative are known from the Eocene of England.

== Description ==
The type leaf of Tilia johnsoni is palmate in venation with an overall orbicular shape, cordate blade base and acute blade tip. The central primary vein is flanked by three pairs of lateral primary veins and the margin of the leaf has evenly spaced, distinctly shaped teeth with rounded sinuses separating them. The inner most set of lateral primary veins run parallel to the median secondary veins, broadly curving upwards and with three secondary veins branching off the exterior side. The branched secondaries run parallel to the next lateral primary vein. The tertiary veins run perpendicular to the secondary veins with an even spacing, while the quaternary veins are orthogonal to the tertiaries forming reticulated pattern of pentagonal and quadrangular spaces.

== Paleoenvironment ==
Formations of the Okanagan Highlands formations represent upland lake systems that were surrounded by a warm temperate ecosystem with nearby volcanism dating from during and just after the early Eocene climatic optimum. The highlands likely had a mesic upper microthermal to lower mesothermal climate, in which winter temperatures rarely dropped low enough for snow, and which were seasonably equitable. The paleoforest surrounding the lakes have been described as precursors to the modern temperate broadleaf and mixed forests of Eastern North America and Eastern Asia. Based on the fossil biotas the lakes were higher and cooler then the coeval coastal forests preserved in the Puget Group and Chuckanut Formation of Western Washington, which are described as lowland tropical forest ecosystems. Estimates of the paleoelevation range between 0.7–1.2 km (0.43–0.75 mi) higher than the coastal forests. This is consistent with the paleoelevation estimates for the lake systems, which range between 1.1–2.9 km (1,100–2,900 m), which is similar to the modern elevation 0.8 km (0.50 mi), but higher.

Estimates of the mean annual temperature have been derived from climate leaf analysis multivariate program (CLAMP) analysis of the Republic paleoflora, and leaf margin analysis (LMA) of both paleofloras. The CLAMP results after multiple linear regressions for Republic gave a mean annual temperature of approximately 8.0 °C (46.4 °F), with the LMA giving 9.2 ± 2.0 °C (48.6 ± 3.6 °F). LMA results from Quilchena returned the higher 14.6 ± 4.8 °C (58.3 ± 8.6 °F), slightly higher than seen at Republic, and CLAMP analysis gave an overall mean annual temperature of 13.3 ± 2.1 °C (55.9 ± 3.8 °F). A bioclimatic-based estimate based on modern relatives of the taxa found at each site suggested mean annual temperatures around 13.5 ± 2.2 °C (56.3 ± 4.0 °F) for Republic and 14.7 ± 2.1 °C (58.5 ± 3.8 °F) for Quilchena. These are lower than the mean annual temperature estimates given for the coastal Puget Group, which is estimated to have been between 15–18.6 °C (59.0–65.5 °F). The bioclimatic analysis for Republic and Falkland suggest mean annual precipitation amounts of 115 ± 39 cm (45 ± 15 in) and 121 ± 39 cm (48 ± 15 in) respectively.
