= Acer ashwilli =

Acer ashwilli Temporal range: Rupelian

Scientific classification
- Kingdom: Plantae
- Clade: Tracheophytes
- Clade: Angiosperms
- Clade: Eudicots
- Clade: Rosids
- Order: Sapindales
- Family: Sapindaceae
- Genus: Acer
- Section: Acer sect. Ginnala
- Species: †A. ashwilli

Binomial name
- †Acer ashwilli Wolfe & Tanai, 1987

Extinct species of maple

Acer ashwilli is an extinct maple species in the family Sapindaceae described from a group of fossil leaves and samaras. The species is solely known from the Early Oligocene sediments exposed in central Oregon, USA. It is one of several extinct species belonging to the living section Ginnala.

== Taxonomy ==
Acer ashwilli is known from a series of eight leaf specimens and nine samaras which were recovered from eight different outcrops of the Early Oligocene, Rupelian stage Bridge Creek Flora, part of the John Day Formation. When first studied by Leo Lesquereux and John Strong Newberry the Bridge Creek flora was thought to be Miocene age, while Frank Hall Knowlton placed the flora into the Eocene Clarno Formation in 1902. It wasn't until Ralph Works Chaney's studies of the fossils in the 1920s that the age was corrected to the Early Oligocene. The Bridge Creek flora is identified as a fully temperate flora, and represents the transition of the Oregon floras from older "borealtropical" forests to more modern forests most similar to the temperate deciduous hardwood assemblages of Southeast Asia. A. ashwilli, when first described, was placed into the Acer section Trilobata which was erected by Antonina Pojarkova. Later molecular studies have shown Trilobata not to be a natural grouping, and the section and included species have been moved into the Acer section Ginnala.

The type specimens for Acer ashwilli are placed into three different repositories. The holotype leaf type specimen, a part and counterpart numbered UCMP 9036A, B along with six paratype leaves and seven paratype samaras are currently preserved in the paleobotanical collections housed at the University of California Museum of Paleontology, in Berkeley, California. Four other paratype leaves and three paratype samaras are housed in the National Museum of Natural History, part of the Smithsonian while the last paratype leaf is part of the University of Oregon Museum of Natural and Cultural History collections in Eugene, Oregon. The specimens were studied by paleobotanists Jack A. Wolfe of the United States Geological Survey, Denver office and Toshimasa Tanai of Hokkaido University. Wolfe and Tanai published their 1987 type description for A. ashwilli in the Journal of the Faculty of Science, Hokkaido University. The etymology of the chosen specific name ashwilli is in recognition of Melvin Ashwill for his years of collecting fossils from around the Madras, Oregon area and for his assistance to the authors in locating Acer specimens from the Madras area.

== Description ==
Leaves of Acer ashwilli are simple in structure, with perfectly actinodromous vein structure and are ovate to very wide ovate in shape. The leaves are three-lobed with the lateral lobes are two thirds as long as the median lobe and all lobes being triangular in outline with the medial lobe a wider triangle then the lateral lobes. The leaves have three primary veins, between seven and nine secondary veins, and range between 5–10.5 cm (2.0–4.1 in) long by 4.0–8.0 cm (1.6–3.1 in) wide in overall dimensions. The samaras of A. ashwilli have a moderately inflated nutlet and smoothly diverging veins which rarely anastomise. The overall shape of the nutlet is elliptic with the average length of the samara up to 3.4 cm (1.3 in) and a wing width of 1.0 cm (0.39 in). The paired samaras of the species have a 20° to 30° attachment angle and the distal region of the nutlet and wing forming u-shaped shallow sulcus.
