= Aythya chauvirae =

Aythya chauvirae Temporal range: Middle Miocene

Scientific classification
- Kingdom: Animalia
- Phylum: Chordata
- Class: Aves
- Order: Anseriformes
- Family: Anatidae
- Genus: Aythya
- Species: †A. chauvirae

Binomial name
- †Aythya chauvirae Cheneval, 1987

Extinct species of duck

Aythya chauvirae is an extinct species of Aythya that lived during the Middle Miocene.

== Distribution ==
Aythya chauvirae is known from France.
