= Tytthostonyx =

Tytthostonyx Temporal range: Late Cretaceous, 66 Ma

Scientific classification
- Kingdom: Animalia
- Phylum: Chordata
- Class: Aves
- Order: Procellariiformes
- Family: †Tytthostonychidae; Olson & Parris, 1987
- Genus: †Tytthostonyx; Olson & Parris, 1987
- Species: †T. glauconiticus

Binomial name
- †Tytthostonyx glauconiticus Olson & Parris, 1987

Extinct genus of birds

Tytthostonyx is a genus of prehistoric seabird. Found in the much-debated Hornerstown Formation which straddles the Cretaceous–Paleogene boundary 66 million years ago, this animal was apparently closely related to the ancestor of some modern birds, such as Procellariiformes and/or "Pelecaniformes". A single species is placed herein, Tytthostonyx glauconiticus.

It has been placed into a family of its own, Tytthostonychidae.
