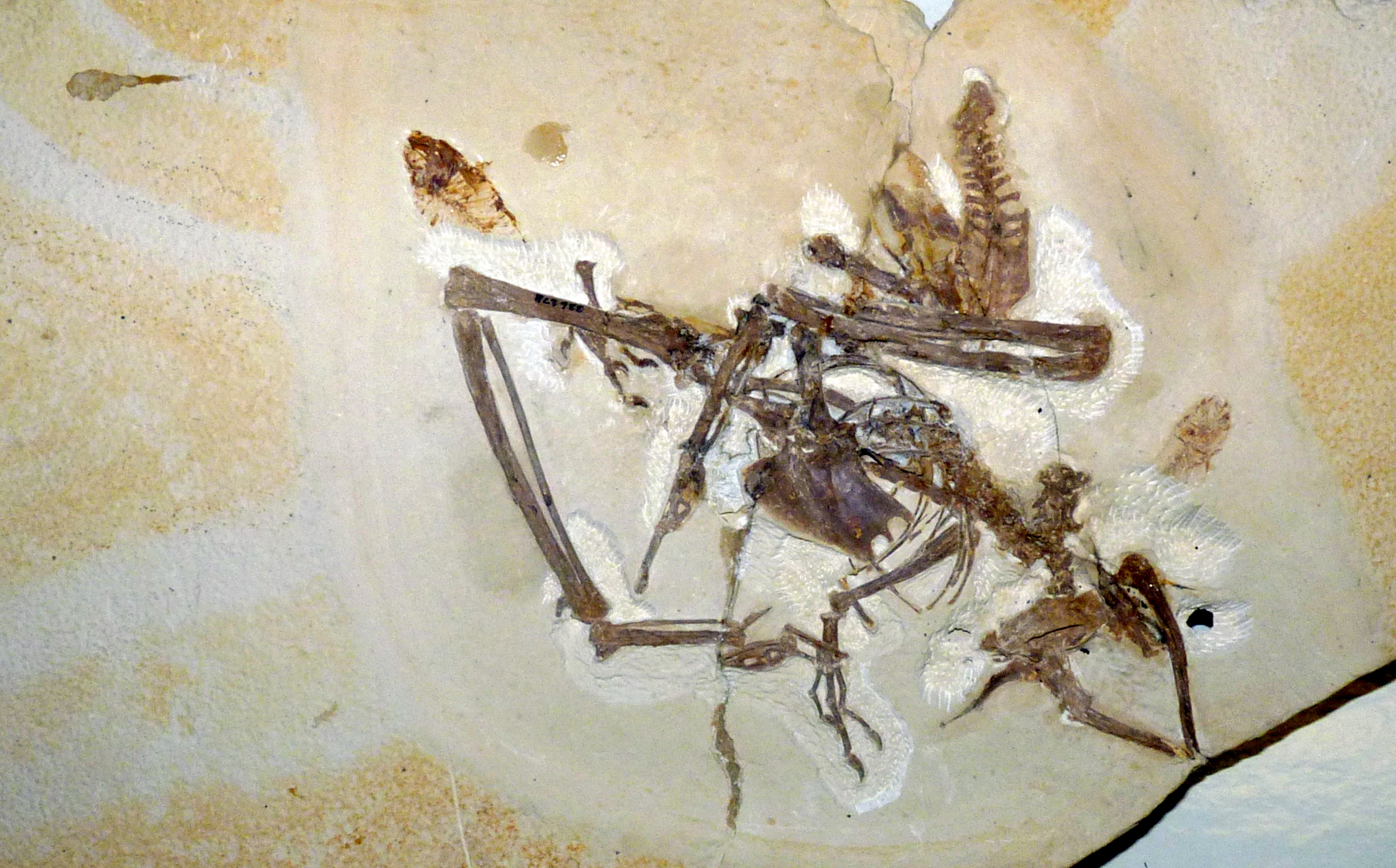

Scientific classification
- Kingdom: Animalia
- Phylum: Chordata
- Class: Aves
- Genus: †Prefica
- Species: †P. nivea

Binomial name
- †Prefica nivea Olson, 1987

= Prefica =

Prefica Temporal range: Ypresian

Extinct genus of birds

Prefica is an extinct genus of bird that lived during the Ypresian stage of the Eocene epoch.

== Distribution ==
Prefica nivea is |known from the Green River Formation of Wyoming.
