= Meshik River =

River in Alaska, the United States of America

- Location of the mouth of the Meshik River in Alaska

Location
- Country: United States
- State: Alaska
- Borough: Lake and Peninsula

Physical characteristics
- Source: Meshik Lake, Aleutian Range, Alaska Peninsula
  - location: Aniakchak National Monument and Preserve
  - coordinates: 56°51′59″N 158°03′22″W
  - elevation: 1,766 ft (538 m)
- Mouth: Bristol Bay
  - location: Port Heiden
  - coordinates: 56°48′32″N 158°39′46″W
  - elevation: 0 ft (0 m)
- Length: 31 mi (50 km)

The Meshik River is a stream, 31 miles (50 km) long, on the Alaska Peninsula in the U.S. state of Alaska. Beginning on the flanks of Mount Aniakchak in Aniakchak National Monument and Preserve, it flows generally west into Bristol Bay near the city of Port Heiden.

The Meshik is one of several peninsula rivers with many game fish but little fishing pressure because of their remote location, severe weather, and other factors. The main species on the main stem and its tributaries are Chinook, Coho, and sockeye salmon, as well as char. Access is possible by boat or floatplane.

== See also ==
- List of rivers of Alaska
