= Kirk Johnson (scientist) =

American paleontologist (born 1960)

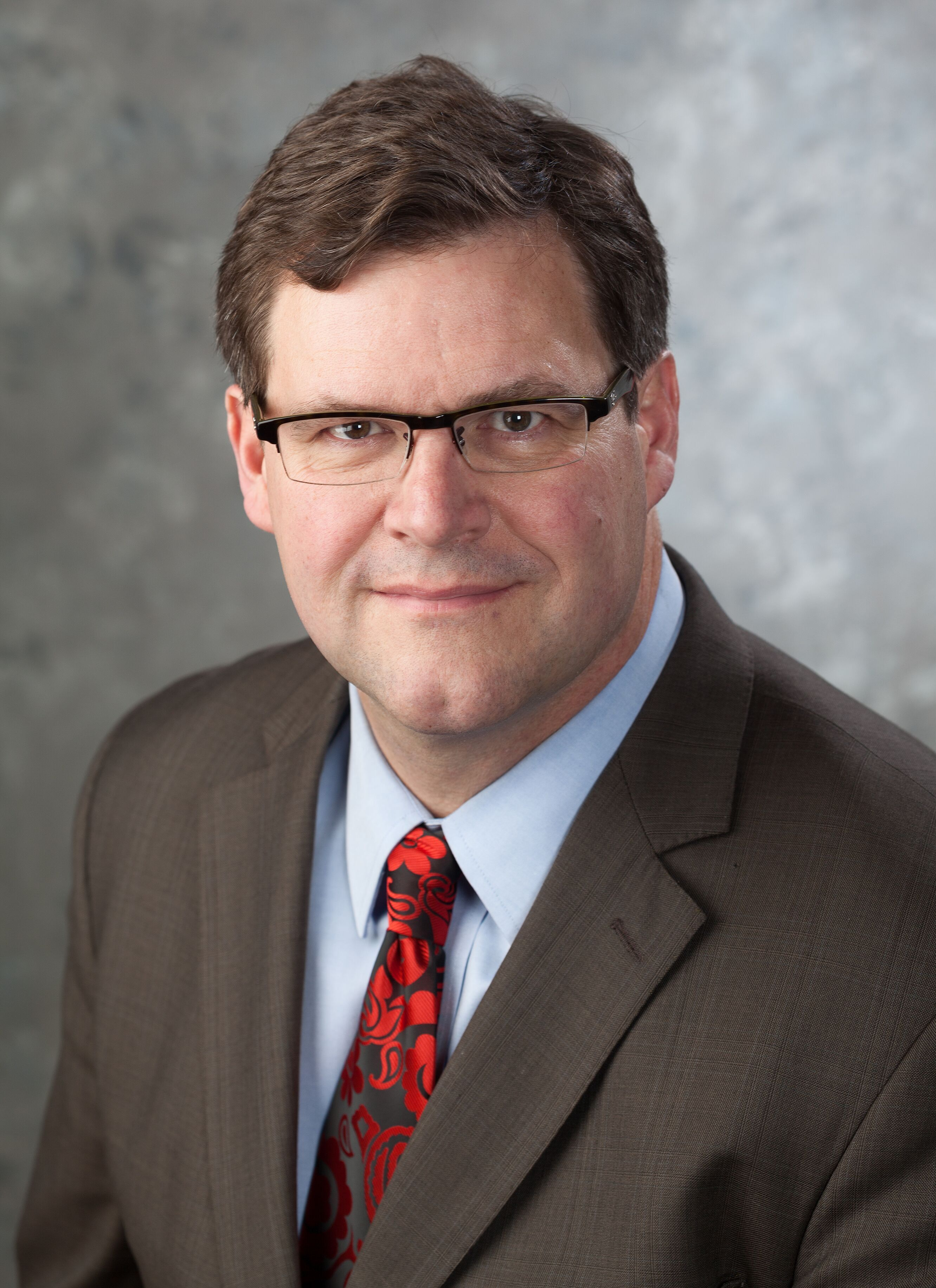
- Johnson in 2013
- Born: Kirk Richard Johnson; 1960 (age 65–66); Seattle, Washington, U.S.
- Education: Amherst College (BA); University of Pennsylvania (MA); Yale University (PhD)
- Relatives: Kirsten Johnson (sister)
- Scientific career
- Fields: Geology; Paleobotany
- Workplaces: Denver Museum of Nature and Science, Smithsonian's National Museum of Natural History

Kirk Richard Johnson (born 1960) is an American paleontologist, author, curator, and museum administrator, and is currently serving as Sant Director of Smithsonian's National Museum of Natural History.

== Early life and education ==
Johnson was born in 1960 and grew up in Seattle, Washington. He attended Amherst College as an undergraduate, where he received a bachelor's degree in geology and fine arts. He joined Chi Psi fraternity. He then attended the University of Pennsylvania, earning a master's degree in geology and paleobotany. He received his Ph.D. in geology and paleobotany from Yale University in 1989.

While in graduate school, in 1987, Johnson discovered an extinct species of linden leaf, which was named Tilia johnsoni in his honor. His postdoctoral work included field research in the northern Australian rainforests, while he served as a postdoctoral research associate in the department of botany at the University of Adelaide.

== Career ==
From 1991 to 2012, Johnson worked at the Denver Museum of Nature and Science, first as a lead scientist, then the chief curator and vice president of research and collections. In 2010, he led a nine-month excavation of thousands of Ice Age animal bones, including mammoths and mastodons, in Snowmass Village, Colorado.

In 2012 Johnson was selected to lead the National Museum of Natural History in Washington, D.C., one of the Smithsonian Institution’s most popular museums on the National Mall. He is the host of the PBS Nova series, Making North America, which is a three-part series that describes the shaping of North America, which aired on November 4, 11 and 18, 2015. In 2017 he hosted the three-part PBS series Great Yellowstone Thaw. He is also the host of the two-hour Nova special Polar Extremes, first shown on February 5, 2020, which explores the history of the North and South Poles ranging from ice sheets to warm forests.

== Personal life ==
Johnson's sister, Kirsten Johnson, is a documentary filmmaker and cinematographer, whose documentary Dick Johnson Is Dead explores their father's battle with dementia, before his death.

== Selected books ==
- Johnson, Kirk; Troll, Ray (2018). Cruisin' the fossil coastline: The travels of an artist and a scientist along the shores of the prehistoric Pacific. Golden, CO: Fulcrum Publishing. ISBN 9781555917432. OCLC 1029091568.
- Johnson, Kirk (2012). Digging Snowmastodon: Discovering an Ice Age World in the Colorado Rockies. Denver, CO; Aspen, CO: Denver Museum of Nature & Science; People's Press. ISBN 9781936905065. OCLC 756579046.
- Johnson, Kirk; Troll, Ray (2007). Cruisin' the Fossil Freeway: An epoch tale of a scientist and an artist on the ultimate 5,000 mile paleo road trip. Golden, CO: Fulcrum Pub. ISBN 9781555914516. OCLC 125404857.
- Johnson, Kirk (2006). Prehistoric Journey: A history of life on Earth. Golden, CO: Fulcrum Pub. ISBN 9781555915537. OCLC 62118347.
- Johnson, Kirk (2005). Ancient Denvers: Scenes from the past 300 million years of the Colorado Front Range. Golden, CO: Fulcrum Pub. ISBN 9781938486210. OCLC 911181981.

== Awards and honors ==
- Fellow, American Association for the Advancement of Science, 2023
