= Jack A. Wolfe =

American paleontologist

Jack Albert Wolfe
- Born: July 10, 1936; Portland, Oregon
- Died: August 12, 2005 (aged 69)
- Education: University of California, Berkeley
- Known for: CLAMP Fossil leaf analysis
- Awards: Paleontological Society Medal (2000)
- Scientific career
- Fields: Paleobotany

Jack Albert Wolfe (1936–2005) was a United States Geological Survey paleobotanist and paleoclimatologist best known for his studies of Tertiary climate in western North America through analysis of fossil angiosperm leaves.

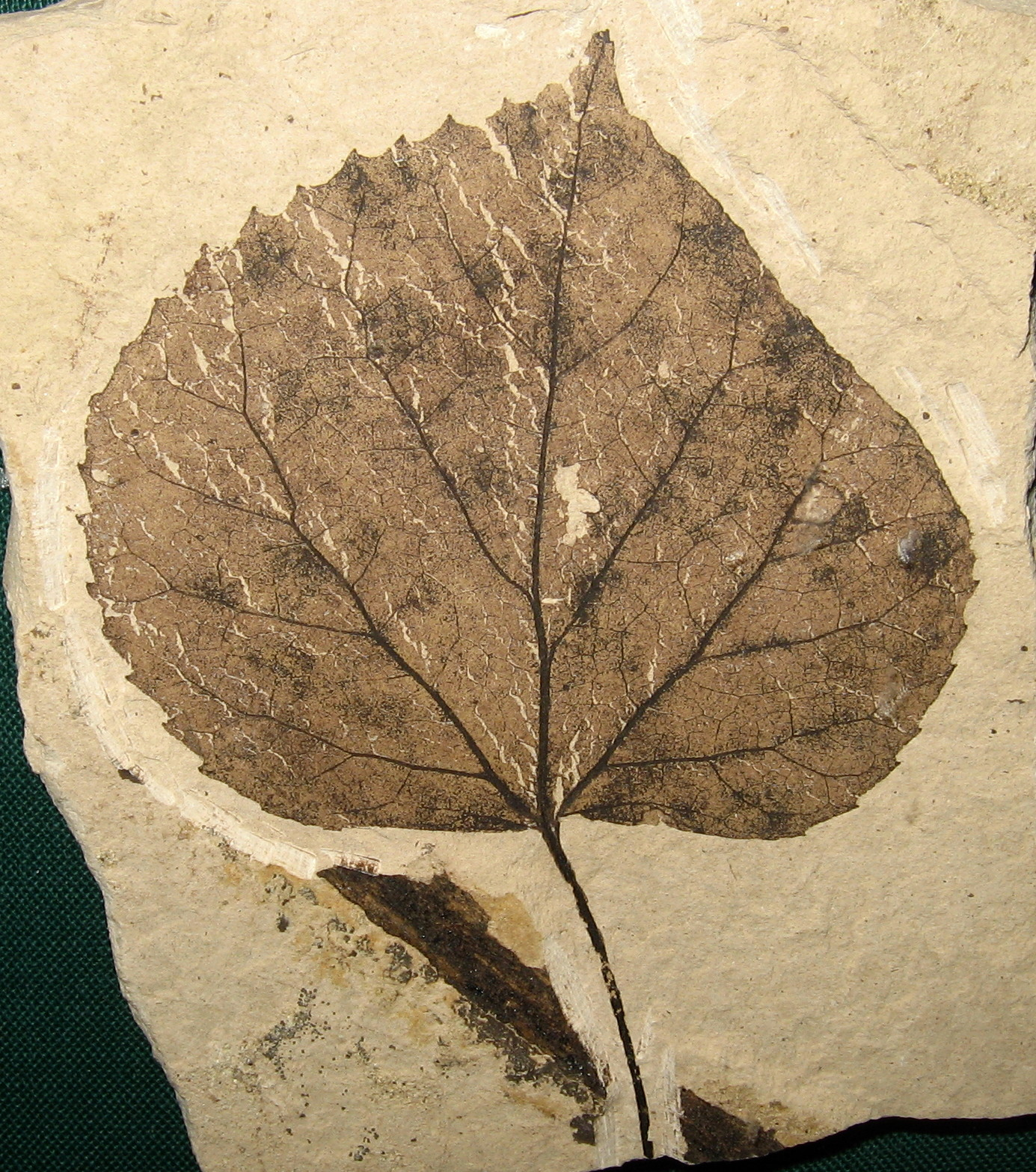
Tilia johnsoni an extinct linden described by Wolfe and Wehr in 1987
