= Paleoflora of the Eocene Okanagan Highlands =

Plant and fungi fossils from the Eocene Okanagan Highlands

The paleoflora of the Eocene Okanagan Highlands includes all plant and fungi fossils preserved in the Eocene Okanagan Highlands Lagerstätten. The highlands are a series of Early Eocene geological formations which span an 1,000 km (620 mi) transect of British Columbia, Canada and Washington state, United States and are known for the diverse and detailed plant fossils which represent an upland temperate ecosystem immediately after the Paleocene-Eocene thermal maximum, and before the increased cooling of the middle and late Eocene to Oligocene. The fossiliferous deposits of the region were noted as early as 1873, with small amounts of systematic work happening in the 1880-90s on British Columbian sites, and 1920-30s for Washington sites. A returned focus and more detailed descriptive work on the Okanagan Highlands sites revived in the 1970s. The noted richness of agricultural plant families in Republic and Princeton floras resulted in the term "Eocene orchards" being used for the paleofloras.

Major Eocene Okanagan Highlands sites

== Paleoflora ==
The Eocene Okanagan Highlands hosted a diverse mix of temperate and tropical paleobiotic elements, with the forests having the first significant proportions of temperate plants in North America. The paleobotanical community was a mixture of plants found in subtropical evergreen and temperate deciduous forests. Included in the forest were a number of important modern temperate flowering plant families such as Betulaceae, Rosaceae, and Sapindaceae, plus the conifer family Pinaceae. Study of the deciduous plants from the highlands has documented the occurrence of heteromorphic leaves derived from sun versus shade conditions and long shoot or short shoot buds. The paleobotanical community of the Republic area has been noted as the most diverse floral community of the Okanagan highlands, with some estimates ranging to over 68 families and 134 genera being present. The noted richness of Rosaceae fossils along with other important agricultural plant families found in the Republic and Princeton floras, including the genera that contain modern apples, blackberries, cherries, and serviceberries resulted in Wes Wher and Donald Hopkins (1994) coining the term "Eocene orchards". Fossil evidence from both Sorbus/Crataegus and Rhus leaves in the Republic sites indicate the area was a center for species overlap and active hybridization events.

== Extent ==
The majority of the lake deposits are compression fossils in lake bed sediments grouped informally into "Northern", "Central", and "Southern" sites. The Northern sites are composed of unnamed Ootsa Group formations which outcrop as the "Driftwood shales" near Smithers, British Columbia, sites now considered lost in the Quesnel, British Columbia area, and the "Horsefly shales", of an unnamed formation and unnamed group which outcrop around Horsefly, British Columbia. The Central sites represent Kamloops Group formations with the McAbee Fossil Beds, Tranquille River site and Falkland site, all in the Tranquille Formation, the Quichena site and Stump Lake site in the Coldwater Beds and outcrops of the Chu Chua Formation near Barriere, British Columbia. The Southern sites include the Princeton Group Allenby Formation sites surrounding Princeton, British Columbia, such as "Nine Mile Creek", "One Mile Creek", "Pleasant Valley", "Thomas Ranch", "Vermilian Bluffs", and "Whipsaw Creek". The most southerly of the Okanagan Highlands lakes, the Klondike Mountain Formation in Northern Ferry County, Washington include the "Boot Hill", "Corner Lot", "Gold Mountain", "Knob Hill", and "Mount Elizabeth" localities. Closely correlated with the Klondike Mountain Formation are the Penticton groups Kettle River, Marama and Marron Formations in the Boundary District along the Canada-United States border.

There is debate as to the affiliation of the, now lost, Quesnel outcrops with the Greater Okanagan Highlands. Archibald et al. (2018) in the monograph overview of the Highlands Hymenoptera included them as part of the series. However the certainty for the placement was later questioned by Archibald and Cannings (2022) who opted to tentatively exclude Quesnel from the highlands while discussing the history of field collecting in the region.

== Chert and amber ==
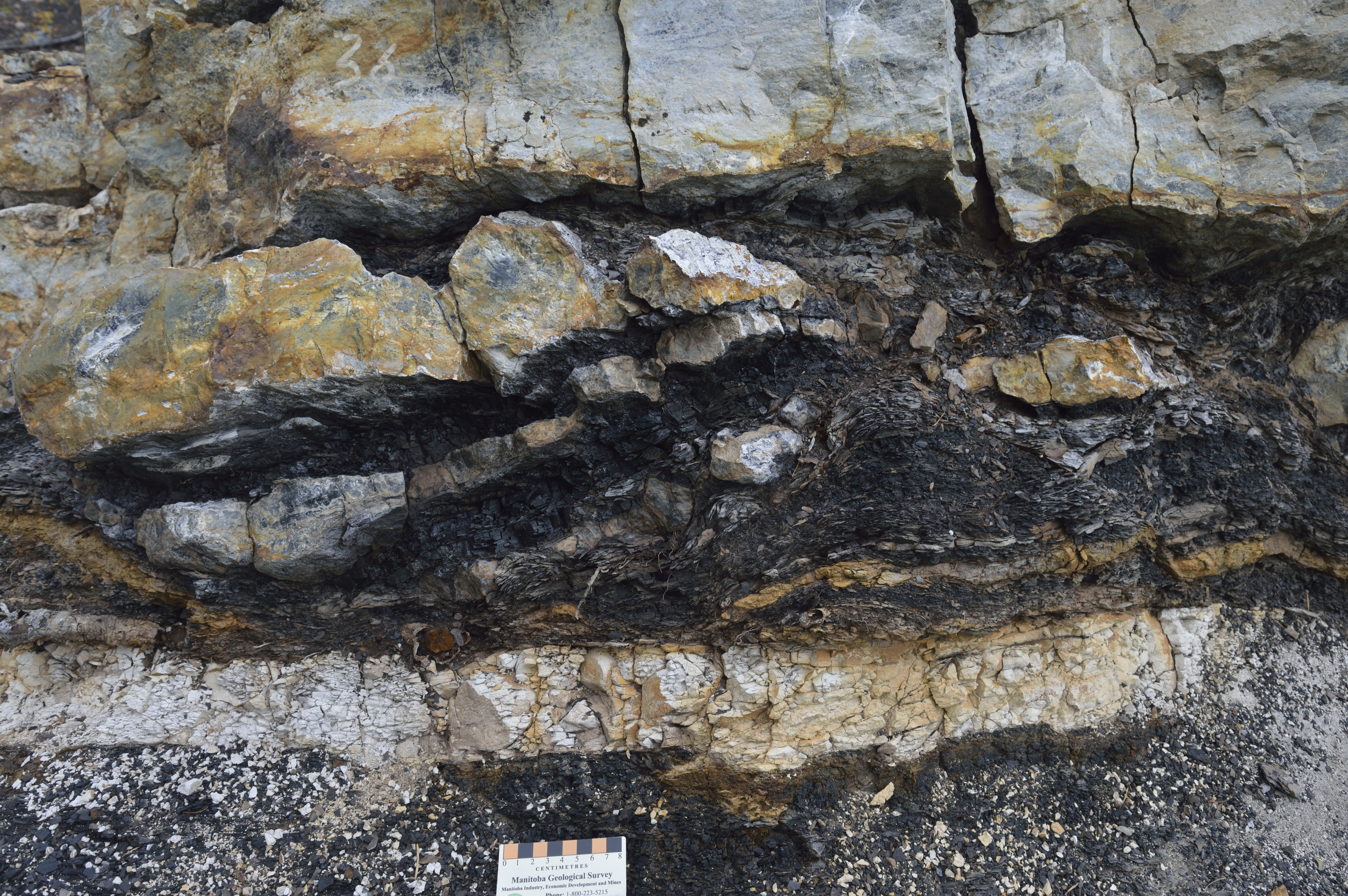
Princeton Chert & "Ashnola shales" interbedding

Additionally two important non-compression biotas are present in the Eocene Okanagan Highlands. A permineralized chert flora, the Princeton Chert is found along the Similkameen River interbedded with coal deposits of the Ashnola shale unit, Allenby Formation known for anatomically preserved plants. In the Central sites, subbituminous coal of the Hat Creek Coal Formation around Hat Creek hosts an amber biota, the Hat Creek amber which preserves many small insects and plant fragments that would likely not be found in the compression biotas.

== Diatoms ==
A small group of algae taxa in the protist order Ochrophyta have been described from the highlands. The Horsefly shales preserve and are placed in the family Aulacoseiraceae, a member of the diatom order Bacillariophyceae,. The third algae was first identified as a living paleoendemic Mallomonas species M. intermedia now restricted to warmer climates in North America and Europe. Genetic study of living specimens of M. intermedia from Europe and North America by Pael Škaloud and team reveled the North American specimens to be a distinct but related species, with the two species diverging in the Miocene. This resulted in the Horsefly specimens being considered an undescribed Mallomonas species ancestral to the whole species group the modern taxa belong to. In association with the identified diatom genera, undescribed fragilarioid diatoms, paraphysomonad golden-algae, Heliozoans, and euglyphid salicaceous amoebae have been reported.

Family	Genus	species	Sites	Notes	Images
Aulacoseiraceae	Aulacoseira	"Undescribed"	Horsefly	An aulacoseiraceous diatom Not described to species	
Aulacoseiraceae	†Eoseira	†Eoseira wilsonii	Horsefly	An aulacoseiraceous diatom	
Mallomonadaceae	Mallomonas	"Undescribed"	Horsefly	An mallomonadaceous synurid algae Originally placed in M. intermedia Revised to Mallomonas sp. in 2025.	
Eunotiaceae	Eunotia	"Undescribed"	Horsefly	An undescribed eunotiaceous diatom.	
Tabellariaceae	†Forticellula	†Forticellula wolfei	Horsefly	An tabellariaceous fragilariophycean diatom	
Tabellariaceae	Oxyneis	"Undescribed"	Horsefly	An undescribed tabellariaceous fragilariophycean diatom	
Tabellariaceae	Tabellaria	"Undescribed"	Horsefly	An undescribed tabellariaceous fragilariophycean diatom	

== Bryophytes ==
A group of six mosses were described from the Allenby Formation by Kuc (1972,1974) representing the genera Ditrichites, Hypnites and Plagiopodopsis, with two species placed in the morphogenus Muscites. Further revision of the fossils was conducted by Milner (1980), who placed two species into the genus Plagiopodopsis and moved both species described as Palaeohypnum to other genera. One further moss has been described from Horsefly, and placed in the living genus Aulacomnium by Janssens et al (1979). Dillhoff et al. (2013) reference undescribed moss specimens from the Klondike Mountain Formation known from vegetative gametophytes, and George Poinar, Jr. et al. (1999) illustrated an undescribed specimen of moss entombed in Hat Creek Amber.

Family	Genus	species	Sites	Notes	Images
Amblystegiaceae	†Hypnites	†Hypnites jovet-astiae	Princeton	An amblystegiaceous moss, First described as Palaeohypnum jovet-asti, moved to Hypnites jovet-astiae in 1980	
Amblystegiaceae	†Hypnites	†Hypnites steerei	Princeton	An amblystegiaceous moss First described as Palaeohypnum steerei, moved to Hypnites steerei in 1980	
Aulacomniaceae	Aulacomnium	†Aulacomnium heterostichoides	Horsefly	An aulacomniaceous moss	
Bartramiaceae	†Plagiopodopsis	†Plagiopodopsis eocenicus	Princeton	A bartramiaceous moss First described as Muscites eocenicus, moved to Plagiopodopsis eocenicus in 1980	
?Ditrichaceae	†Ditrichites	†Ditrichites fylesi	Princeton	A ditrichaceous moss	
Incertae sedis	†Muscites	†Muscites maycocki	Princeton	A moss of uncertain placement	
Incertae sedis	†Muscites	†Muscites ritchiei	Princeton	A moss of uncertain placement	
Undescribed	Undescribed	Undescribed	Falkland; Horsefly; Princeton; Republic	Undescribed moss compression specimens	undescribed bryophyte
Undescribed	Undescribed	Undescribed	Hat Creek	Undescribed moss amber specimens	

== Lycophytes ==
Both an undescribed member of the fossil quillwort genus Isoetites and the spikemoss genus Selaginella have been found in the Klondike Mountain Formation, while an additional fossil deemed Cf. Selaginella was later reported from the Allenby Formation.

Family	Genus	species	Sites	Notes	Images
Isoetaceae	†Isoetites	Undescribed	Republic	A quillwort relative Not described	Isoetites species
Selaginellaceae	Selaginella	Undescribed	Republic	A spikemoss Not described	Selaginella species
Selaginellaceae	Cf. Selaginella	Undescribed	Princeton	A spikemoss from the Thomas Ranch site. Not described	

== Pteridophytes ==
Five species of ferns and fern relatives have been described from the compression biotas and an additional four compression taxa that have been tentatively identified to family or genus. A series of four additional ferns have been described from premineralized specimens in the Princeton Chert and a fifth taxon is identified to genus. Several fern specimens were briefly mentioned from Horsefly but no taxonomic assignment was made due to lack of reproductive vegetation.

Family	Genus	species	Sites	Notes	Images
Athyriaceae	†Dickwhitea	†Dickwhitea allenbyensis	Princeton Chert	An athyriaceous fern	
Athyriaceae	†Makotopteris	†Makotopteris princetonensis	Princeton Chert	An athyriaceous fern	
Blechnaceae	†Trawetsia	†Trawetsia princetonensis	Princeton Chert	A blechnacious fern	
Blechnaceae	Woodwardia	†Woodwardia arctica	Chu Chua	A blechnacious fern First identified as Woodwardia maxoni	Woodwardia arctica
Cystopteridaceae	Cf. Cystopteris	Undescribed	Republic	A possible bladder fern relative. Not identified to species	
Dennstaedtiaceae	Dennstaedtia	†Dennstaedtia christophelii	Falkland; Republic	A Hayscented fern First identified at Falkland as (?)Adiantum sp.2	Dennstaedtia christophelii
Dennstaedtiaceae	†Dennstaedtiopsis	†Dennstaedtiopsis aerenchymata	Princeton Chert	A dennstaedtioid fern	
Equisetaceae	Equisetum	†Equisetum similkamense	Chu chua; Princeton	A scouring rush Possibly a synonym of Equisetum boreale per Berry (1926).	
Equisetaceae	Equisetum	Undescribed	Falkland; Hat Creek; Republic	A scouring rush. Not identified to species	Equisetum species Not described
Hymenophyllaceae	Hymenophyllum	†Hymenophyllum axsmithii	Republic	A filmy fern	
Lygodiaceae	Lygodium	Undescribed	Republic	A climbing fern. Not identified to species	
Osmundaceae	Osmunda	Undescribed	Driftwood; Horsefly; Princeton; Princeton Chert	An osmundaceous fern Not identified to species	
Pteridaceae	(?)Adiantum	Undescribed	Falkland	A possible maidenhair fern Not identified to species Listed by Smith et al. (2012) as (?)Adiantum sp. 1	
Salviniaceae	Azolla	†Azolla primaeva	Horsefly; Princeton; Quilchena; Republic; Stump Lake	A mosquito fern, First described as Azollophyllum primaevum	
Salviniaceae	Azolla	Undescribed	Driftwood; Falkland	A mosquito fern, Not identified to species	
Salviniaceae	Salvinia	Undescribed	Republic (Mt Elizabeth)	A "watermoss" species. Not identified to species.	Salvinia species not described
Thelypteridaceae	Cf. Phegopteris	Unidentified	Driftwood	A northern beech fern species. Not described to species. Comparable to species of the P. connectilis group	Cf. Phegopteris

== Gymnosperms ==
Three major groups of gymnosperms are present in the Okanagan Highlands formations, with the most speciose being the pinophytes. The ginkgophytes are represented by two species of Ginkgo, while an undescribed Zamiaceae member is the sole cycadophyte.

=== Cycadophytes ===
Family	Genus	species	Sites	Notes	Images
Zamiaceae	Undescribed	Undescribed	Republic	A zamiaceous cycad. Not described to genus/species	Undescribed zamiaceous leaf

=== Gingkophytes ===
Family	Genus	Species	Sites	Notes	Images
Ginkgoaceae	Ginkgo	Ginkgo biloba	Chu chua; Falkland; McAbee; Princeton; Quilchena; Republic; Tranquille	A ginkgo, Possibly belonging to †Ginkgo adiantoides instead.	Ginkgo biloba
Ginkgoaceae	Ginkgo	†Ginkgo dissecta	Falkland; McAbee; Princeton; Republic	A ginkgo	Ginkgo dissecta
Ginkgoaceae	Ginkgo	Undescribed	Driftwood; Hat Creek	A ginkgo Not described to species	

=== Conifers ===
==== Cupressaceae ====
Family	Genus	Species	Sites	Notes	Images
Cunninghamioideae	Cunninghamia	Undescribed	Driftwood; McAbee; Princeton; Republic	A Cunninghamia; Not described to species	Cunninghamia species.
Cupressoideae	Calocedrus	Undescribed	Quilchena; Republic	An incense cedar Not described to species	
Cupressoideae	Chamaecyparis	Undescribed	Driftwood; Falkland; Horsefly; McAbee; Princeton; Quilchena; Republic	A false cypress Not described to species Possibly in the Callitropsis nootkatensis lineage.	
Cupressoideae	†Cupressinocladus	†Cupressinocladus interruptus	Falkland	A Cupressoid foliage morphotaxon.	
Cupressoideae	†Cupressinocladus	Undescribed	Princeton	A Cupressoid foliage morphotaxon. Not described to species First identified as Chamaecyparis linguaefolia	
Cupressoideae	Juniperus	Undescribed	Hat Creek (pollen); Horsefly; McAbee (pollen); Princeton	A juniper Not described to species	
Cupressoideae	Thuja	Undescribed	Driftwood; McAbee; Princeton; Quilchena; Republic	An arborvitae Not described to species	
Cupressoideae	Cf. Calocedrus	Undescribed	McAbee	An incense cedar relative Not described to genus/species	
Cupressoideae	Cf. Thujopsis	Undescribed	Driftwood; McAbee; Republic	A Hiba relative Not described to genus/species	
Sequoioideae	Metasequoia	†Metasequoia milleri	Princeton Chert	A dawn redwood	
Sequoioideae	Metasequoia	†Metasequoia occidentalis	Chu Chua; Driftwood; Falkland; Horsefly; Kettle River; McAbee; Princeton; Quilchena; Republic; Tranquille	A dawn redwood Older sources identified as: "Sequoia" angustifolia; S." brevifolia; "S." heerii; "S." langsdorfii (in part); "S." nordenskiöldi; Taxodium distichum miocenum (in part); Taxodium occidentale	Metasequoia occidentalis
Sequoioideae	Metasequoia	Undescribed	Hat Creek	A dawn redwood Not described to species	
Sequoioideae	Sequoia	†Sequoia affinis	Falkland; Princeton; Republic	A Redwood; Reported by Brown (1935) from Republic as "Sequioa langsdorfii"	Sequoia affinis
Sequoioideae	Sequoia	Undescribed	Chu Chua; Driftwood; Horsefly; McAbee; Quilchena		
Taiwanioideae	Taiwania	Undescribed	Republic	A Taiwania species not described to species	
Taxodioideae	Cryptomeria	Undescribed	McAbee; Republic	A sugi Not described to species	
Taxodioideae	Glyptostrobus	†Glyptostrobus europaeus	Chu Chua; Horsefly; Kamloops; Stump Lake; Princeton	A Chinese swamp cypress	
Taxodioideae	Glyptostrobus	Undescribed	Falkland(?); Hat Creek; Quilchena; Republic	A Chinese swamp cypress Not described to species	Glyptostrobus species
Taxodioideae	Taxodium	†Taxodium dubium	Chu Chua; Falkland; Republic	A bald cypress	
Taxodioideae	Taxodium	Undescribed	Chu Chua; Hat Creek (pollen); McAbee; Princeton; Quilchena	A bald cypress not described to species	
Incertae sedis	†Cupressinoxylon	†Cupressinoxylon dawsoni	Horsefly	A fossil cupressaceous? wood First described as Cupressoxylon dawsoni	
Incertae sedis	†Cupressinoxylon	†Cupressinoxylon macrocarpoides	Kettle River	A fossil cupressaceous? wood First described as Cupressoxylon macrocarpoides	

==== Pinaceae ====
Family	Genus	Species	Sites	Notes	Images
Abietoideae	Abies	†Abies milleri	Falkland; McAbee; Princeton; Republic	Oldest true fir described	
Abietoideae	Abies	†Abies toxirivus	Chu Chua; Quilchena	A fir conescale morphospecies First named Pinus steenstrupiana in (1868); Moved to Abies steenstrupiana 1952; Moved to Abies toxirivus in 1959	
Abietoideae	Abies	Undescribed	Driftwood; Horsefly; Quilchena	A true fir Not described to species	
Abietoideae	Keteleeria	Undescribed	Quilchena	A Keteleeria species Not described to species	
Abietoideae	Pseudolarix	Pseudolarix amabilis	Chu Chua; Driftwood; McAbee; Princeton; Stump Lake	A golden larch originally identified as Pseudolarix americana, then as Pseudolarix arnoldii	
Abietoideae	Pseudolarix	†Pseudolarix wehrii	Princeton; Republic	A long bracted golden larch Originally described as Pseudolarix americana.	Pseudolarix wehrii
Abietoideae	Pseudolarix	Undescribed	Driftwood; Falkland; Horsefly; Quilchena	A golden larch Not described to species	
Abietoideae	Tsuga	Undescribed	Driftwood; Horsefly; McAbee (pollen); Princeton; Quilchena; Republic	A hemlock Not described to species	
Laricoideae	Pseudotsuga	†Pseudotsuga miocena	Horsefly	A Carbonized/petrified wood species Found in the Cariboo mine at ~400–500 ft (120–150 m) depth	Pseudotsuga miocena Radial thin section
Piceoideae	Picea	†Picea columbiensis	Kettle River	A spruce cone & needle species	Picea columbiensis
Piceoideae	Picea	†Picea quilchenensis	Quilchena	A spruce needle species Penhallow (1908) notes it may actually belong to P. tranquilensis	
Piceoideae	Picea	†Picea tranquilensis	Tranquille	A spruce needle species Penhallow (1908) notes P. quilchenensis may be a synonym	
Piceoideae	Picea	Undescribed	Driftwood; Falkland; Horsefly; McAbee; Princeton; Quilchena; Republic	A spruce Not described	
Pinoideae	Pinus	†Pinus allisonii	Princeton Chert	A 2-needled Pine	
Pinoideae	Pinus	†Pinus andersonii	Princeton Chert	A 3-needled Pine	
Pinoideae	Pinus	†Pinus arnoldii	Princeton Chert	A basal Pine, First described for ovulate cones A whole plant reconstruction includes the synonymized P. similkameenensis.	
Pinoideae	Pinus	†Pinus columbiana	Kettle River	A permineralized pinaceous wood, compression cone species	Pinus columbiana
Pinoideae	Pinus	†Pinus driftwoodensis	Driftwood	A permineralized pinaceous cone	
Pinoideae	Pinus	†Pinus latahensis	Princeton; Republic	A 5-needle pine	Pinus latahensis
Pinoideae	Pinus	†Pinus macrophylla	Republic	A 3 needle pine, jr homoym to Pinus macrophylla Lindley 1839	"Pinus macrophylla"
Pinoideae	Pinus	†Pinus monticolensis	Princeton; Republic	A pinaceous winged seed morphogenus	Pinus monticolensis
Pinoideae	Pinus	†Pinus princetonensis	Princeton Chert	A pinaceous cone	
Pinoideae	Pinus	†Pinus tetrafolia	Republic	A possible 4 needled pine Noted by Berry as "highly improbable that this should represent a distinct botanic species"	"Pinus tetrafolia"
Pinoideae	Pinus	†Pinus trunculus	Chu Chua; Horsefly; Quilchena; Princeton; Tranquille; Stump Lake	A 3-needle pine	Pinus trunculus
Pinoideae	Pinus	†Pinus tulameenensis	Princeton	A 5-needle pine	
Pinoideae	Pinus	Undescribed	Chu Chua; Driftwood; Falkland; Horsefly; McAbee; Quilchena	Pine leaves and seeds Not described to species	

==== Sciadopityaceae ====
Name	Authority	Year	Family	Notes	Images
Sciadopityaceae	Sciadopitys	Undescribed	Republic	An umbrella pine species	Sciadopitys species

==== Taxaceae ====
Name	Authority	Year	Family	Notes	Images
Taxaceae	Amentotaxus	Undescribed	Horsefly; Princeton; Republic	A yew Not described to species	Amentotaxus sp.
Taxaceae	Cf. Amentotaxus	Undescribed	Driftwood; McAbee; Quilchena	A yew Not described to genus/species	
Taxaceae	Cephalotaxus	Unidentified	Republic	A yew Originally described placed in the Miocene Cephalotaxus bonseri Not described to species	
Taxaceae	Taxus	Undescribed	Hat Creek (pollen); Horsefly; Princeton (pollen); Republic	A yew Not described to species	
Taxaceae	Cf. Taxus	Undescribed	McAbee	A yew relative Not described to genus/species	
Taxaceae	Torreya	Undescribed	Horsefly	A plum-yew Not described to species	
Taxaceae	Cf. Torreya	Undescribed	Driftwood; McAbee; Quilchena; Republic	A plum-yew relative Not described to genus/species	
Taxaceae	Unidentified	Unidentified	Falkland	Cephalotaxaceous needles Not described to genus/species	

== Angiosperms ==
=== Nymphaeales ===
The basal angiosperms are represented by two Nymphaeales water-lily species Nuphar carlquistii from the Republic and Princeton shales, plus Allenbya collinsonae from the Princeton Chert. Wehr (1995) illustrated two fossils that were tentatively identified as fruits of the banana genus Ensete and the extinct myrtle genus Paleomyrtinaea respectively, however further fossil finds resulted in the re-identification of the first as a N. carlquistii rhizome section, and the second is a seed mass from the same water-lily.

Family	Genus	Species	Sites	Notes	Images
Nelumbonaceae?	†Nelumbium	†Nelumbium pygmaeum	Horsefly; Princeton	Possible lotus family leaves Synonym Nelumbo pygmaea (Dawson) Knowlton (1919)	
Nelumbonaceae?	†Nelumbium	Unidentified	Princeton	Fragmentary possible lotus family leaves Penhallow suggests possibly the same as N. pygmaeum.	
Nelumbonaceae?	Nelumbo	Unidentified	Falkland	Lotus leaves Not described to gens or species	
Nymphaeaceae	†Allenbya	†Allenbya collinsonae	Princeton Chert	A waterlily relative. Not to be confused with the odonate Allenbya	
Nymphaeaceae	Nuphar	†Nuphar carlquistii	Princeton; Republic	A waterlily, Rhizome sections were first identified as Ensete.	Nuphar carlquistii seeds

=== Magnoliids ===
Family	Genus	species	Sites	Notes	Images
Lauraceae	Lindera	Undescribed	Princeton	A spicewood species. Not described.	
Lauraceae	Cf. Lindera	Undescribed	Horsefly	A spicewood like species. Not described.	
Lauraceae	Liriodendron	Undescribed	Chu Chua	Tentative identification based on 2 partial specimens	
Lauraceae	†Litseaphyllum	Undescribed	Republic	A lauraceous form species. Not described	
Lauraceae	Ocotea	Undescribed	Republic	A stinkwood species. Not described	
Lauraceae	Phoebe	Undescribed	McAbee; Princeton; Republic	A Phoebe sp. Not described.	
Lauraceae	Sassafras	†Sassafras hesperia	Chu Chua; Falkland; Horsefly; McAbee; Princeton; Republic	A sassafras Formerly identified as Sassafras sellwyni	Sassafras hesperia
Lauraceae	Sassafras	Undescribed	Driftwood; Quilchena	A sassafras species Not described to species	
Lauraceae	Unidentified	Unidentified	Falkland	Lauraceous leaves Not described to genus or species	
Lauraceae	Unidentified	Unidentified	Princeton chert	Lauraceous fruits Likely from a "self pruning" species Not described to genus or species.	
Magnoliaceae	†Liriodendroxylon	†Liriodendroxylon princetonensis	Princeton Chert	A Liriodendron-like wood.	
Magnoliaceae	Magnolia	Undescribed	Princeton; Republic	Magnolia leaves Republic fossils possibly Magnolia subgenus Talauma; Not described to species	Magnolia
Saururaceae	Saururus	†Saururus tuckerae	Princeton Chert	A lizard's-tail species	
incertae sedis	†Dillhoffia	†Dillhoffia cachensis	McAbee; Republic	A flower of uncertain floral relationship, possibly of Magnoliid affinity	Dillhoffia cachensis
incertae sedis	†Princetonia	†Princetonia allenbyensis	Princeton Chert	A possibly aquatic magnoliopsid flower of uncertain affiliation.	

=== Monocots ===
Pigg, Manchester, and DeVore (2023) gave brief descriptions of three monocots from Horsefly, labeling them as Monocot #1 (broad leaved), Monocot #2 (parallel veined), and Monocot #3 (parallel veined). They did not give any taxonomic possibilities for the affinities of the fossils.

Family	Genus	species	Sites	Notes	Images
Alismataceae	†Heleophyton	†Heleophyton helobieoides	Princeton Chert	An aquatic or emergent water-plantain	
Amaryllidaceae	†Paleoallium	†Paleoallium billgenseli	Princeton; Republic	An onion relative	Paleoallium billgenseli
Aponogetonaceae	Aponogeton	†Aponogeton longispinosum	Princeton chert	A Cape-pondweed pollen	
Araceae	†Keratosperma	†Keratosperma allenbyensis	Princeton Chert	An arum family member	
Araceae	Orontium	†Orontium wolfei	Princeton; Republic	A golden club	Orontium wolfei
Arecaceae	†Uhlia	Uhlia allenbyensis	Princeton Chert	A Coryphoid palm	
Cyperaceae	Carex	Undescribed	Horsefly; Quilchena	Sedge fruits Not described to species.	
Poaceae	†Phragmites	Undescribed	Kettle River; Princeton	grass family leaves of uncertain nature.	
Potamogetonaceae	Potamogeton	Unidescribed	Kettle River	A possible Potamogeton species fruit. Not described to species	
Smilacaceae	Smilax	Undescribed	Republic	A greenbrier species. Not Described	
Typhaceae	Typha	Undescribed	Hat Creek Coal; Republic	A cattail species. Not described	
Cf. Iridaceae	†Pararisteapollis	†Pararisteapollis stockeyi	Princeton Chert	A possible iridaceous pollen morphotype	
Incertae sedis	†Ethela	†Ethela sargentiana	Princeton chert	A cyperaceous or juncaceous poalean monocot	
Incertae sedis	†Soleredera	†Soleredera rhizomorpha	Princeton Chert	A lilialean genus of uncertain placement	

=== Eudicots ===
==== "Basal eudicots" ====
Family	Genus	species	Sites	Notes	Images
Menispermaceae	Calycocarpum	Undescribed	Republic	A moonseed Not described to species	
Platanaceae	†Langeranthus	†Langeranthus dillhoffiorum	Republic	A plane tree relative fruiting head.	Langeranthus dillhofforum
Platanaceae	†Langeria	†Langeria magnifica	Chu Chua; McAbee; Quilchena; Republic	A plane tree relative. Formerly identified as "Corylus" macquarrii and then a witch-hazel relative.	Langeria magnifica
Platanaceae	†Macginicarpa	Undescribed	Horsefly; Princeton; Republic	A plane tree fruit taxon Not described to species	Macginicarpa species
Platanaceae	†Macginitiea	†Macginitiea gracilis	Horsefly; McAbee; Princeton; Republic	A plane tree relative. First described at Horsefly as Aralia notata (Penhallow, 1902)	Macginitiea gracilis
Platanaceae	†Macginitiea	Undescribed	Driftwood; Falkland; Quilchena	sycamore relative leaves Not described to species	
Platanaceae	†Platananthus	Undescribed	Republic	A sycamore stamen head Not described to species	
Platanaceae	Undescribed	Undescribed	Horsefly	A Platanus like seed with dispersal hairs Not described to genus or species	
Ranunculaceae	Clematis	Undescribed	Horsefly; Republic	A Clematis; Not described to species	Clematis species
Sabiaceae	Meliosma	Undescribed	Republic	A Meliosma species Not described to species	
Sabiaceae	Sabia	Undescribed	Republic	A Sabia species Not described to species	
Schisandraceae	Kadsura	Undescribed	Republic	A kadsura species. Not described to species	
Trochodendraceae	†Paraconcavistylon	†Paraconcavistylon wehrii	McAbee; Republic	A Trochodendrale first described as "Concavistylon" wehrii moved to a new genus in 2020.	
Trochodendraceae	†Pentacentron	†Pentacentron sternhartae	Republic	A Trochodendrale	Pentacentron sternhartae
Trochodendraceae	Tetracentron	†Tetracentron hopkinsii	Princeton; Republic	A Trochodendrale, possibly the leaves of Pentacentron sternhartae	Tetracentron hopkinsii
Trochodendraceae	Tetracentron	Unidentified	Falkland	Tetracentron leaves Not described to species	
Trochodendraceae	Trochodendron	†Trochodendron drachukii	McAbee	A Trochodendron possibly the fruits of Trochodendron nastae	
Trochodendraceae	Trochodendron	†Trochodendron nastae	McAbee; Republic	A Trochodendron; Possibly the leaves of Trochodendron drachukii First published informally under the name Eobaileya.	Trochodendron nastae
Trochodendraceae	Trochodendron	Unidentified	Falkland	Trochodendron fruits Not described to species	
Trochodendraceae	†Zizyphoides	Undescribed	Driftwood; Falkland; McAbee; Princeton; Republic	A trochodendroid of uncertain placement. Leaves of the fruit taxon Nordenskioldia; Not described to species.	Zizyphoides species
Trochodendraceae?	†Nordenskioldia	Undescribed	McAbee?; Princeton; Republic	A trochodendroid of uncertain placement. Not described to species.	

==== "Superasterids" ====
Family	Genus	species	Sites	Notes	Images
Aquifoliaceae	Ilex	Undescribed	Republic	A holly Not described to species	
Araliaceae	Aralia	Undescribed	Republic	A spikenard species Not described.	
Araliaceae	Cf. Aralia	Undescribed	McAbee?	A spikenard species foliage Not described.	
Araliaceae	Cf. †Paleopanax	Undescribed	McAbee?	A spikenard species fruit Not described.	
Bignoniaceae	Undescribed	Undescribed	Republic	A catalpa family member Not described	Bignoniaceae sp. fruit
Cornaceae	Cornus	Undescribed	Chu Chua; McAbee; Princeton; Quilchena; Republic	A dogwood species, Not described Leaves from Horsefly deemed not Cornus	
Ebenaceae	Unidentified	"Diospyros" dawsonii	Chu Chua	A punitive persimmon relative.	
Ericaceae	Arbutus	Undescribed	Republic	A madrone relative Not described to species	
Ericaceae	Rhododendron	Undescribed	Republic	A Rhododendron; Not described to species	
Ericaceae	Cf. Rhododendron	Undescribed	McAbee	A genus close to Rhododendron; Not described to species	
Ericaceae	†Vaccinophyllum	†Vaccinophyllum quaestum	Princeton	An ericaceous leaf morphogenus	
Ericaceae	Cf. Leucothoe	Undescribed	Republic	A doghobble relative Not described to species	
Eucommiaceae	Eucommia	†Eucommia montana	Quilchena; Republic	A "hard rubber tree" fruit	Eucommia montana
Eucommiaceae	Eucommia	†Eucommia rolandii	Quilchena	A "hard rubber tree" leaf	
Garryaceae	Aucuba	Undescribed	Republic	An Aucuba; Not described to species Host to Incurvariidae (Aff. Incurvaria) moth feeding	
Hydrangeaceae	Hydrangea	Undescribed	Republic	A Hydrangea. Not described to species	
Hydrangeaceae	Philadelphus	Undescribed	Republic	A mock-orange Not described to species	
Icacinaceae	†Palaeophytocrene	Unidentified	Quilchena; Republic	A Phytocrene relative Not described to species	
Nyssaceae	Diplopanax	†Diplopanax eydei	Princeton Chert	A tuplo relative.	
Nyssaceae	†Tsukada	†Tsukada davidiifolia	Princeton; Republic	A dove-tree relative Host to Cecidomyiidae gall midges.	Tsukada davidiifolia
Oleaceae	Fraxinus	†Fraxinus eoemarginata	Quilchena	An ash species with notched samara apex.	
Oleaceae	Fraxinus	Cf. †Fraxinus rupinarum	Quilchena	An ash species with rounded samara apex.	
Oleaceae	Fraxinus	undescribed	McAbee	A possible ash relative. Not described to species due to preservation.	
Schoepfiaceae?	Schoepfia?	†"Schoepfia" republicensis	Republic	A possible Schoepfia relative, First described as "Cornus acuminata.	"Schoepfia" republicensis
Theaceae	?Gordonia	Undescribed	Falkland; Republic	Possible Gordonia fruits Not described to genus or species.	?Gordonia
Theaceae	†Ternstroemites	"Species A"	McAbee; Quilchena; Republic	A theaceous species similar to Gordonia; Not described to species Host to Cecidomyiidae gall midges.	Ternstroemites sp. "A"
Theaceae	†Ternstroemites	"Species B"	Falkland; Republic	A theaceous species similar to Cleyera; Not described to species	Ternstroemites sp. "B"

==== "Superrosids" ====
===== Fabids COM clade =====
Family	Genus	species	Sites	Notes	Images
Elaeocarpaceae	Sloanea	Undescribed	Republic	An elaeocarpaceous fruit Not described to species	Sloanea sp.
Salicaceae	Populus	†Populus acuminatafolia	Chu chua	A cottonwood leaf species	Populus acuminatafolia
Salicaceae	Populus	Undescribed	Driftwood; McAbee; Quilchena; Republic	cottonwood leaves and branches Not described to species First identified as †Populus lindgreni at Republic	
Salicaceae	Pseudosalix	Undescribed	Driftwood; Republic	A willow relative Not described to species	
Salicaceae	Salix	†Salix kamloopsiana	Kamloops	A willow species	
Salicaceae	Salix	†Salix orbicularis	Quilchena	A willow leaf morphospecies	
Salicaceae	Salix	†Salix tulameenensis	Princeton	A willow fruit morphospecies	
Salicaceae	Salix	Undescribed	McAbee; Princeton (pollen); Republic	A willow Not described to species	
Salicaceae	Sapindus	Undescribed	Princeton	A soap berry leaf Not described to species	
Salicaceae	Undescribed	Undescribed	Falkland	Possible Salicaceous leaves Not described to genus or species	

===== Fabids nitrogen‑fixing clade =====
Family	Genus	species	Sites	Notes	Images
Betulaceae	†Alnites	†Alnites curta	Quilchena; Princeton	A betulaceous relative. Not listed by Pigg, Manchester, & DeVore (2023) from Horsefly	
Betulaceae	Alnus	†Alnus cremastogynoides	Chu Chua	An alder.	Alnus cremastogynoides
Betulaceae	Alnus	†Alnus crispoides	Chu Chua	An alder. Deemed nomen nudum by LaMotte (1952)	
Betulaceae	Alnus	†Alnus kefersteinii	Chu Chua	An alder.	Alnus kefersteinii
Betulaceae	Alnus	†Alnus parvifolia	Chu Chua; Falkland; Horsefly; McAbee; Princeton; Quilchena; Republic	An alder. First described as Betula parvifolia (1926); Previously identified as A. corralina (pro part.), A. elliptica and Carpinus grandis (pro part.)	Alnus parvifolia
Betulaceae	Alnus	Undescribed	Chu Chua; Driftwood; McAbee; Princeton; Quilchena	An alder species Not described to species	
Betulaceae	Betula	†Betula leopoldae	Chu Chua; Falkland; McAbee; Princeton; Quilchena; Republic	A birch species	Betula leopoldae
Betulaceae	Betula	Undescribed	Driftwood; Falkland; Kettle River; Quilchena; Tranquille	Birch leaves and cones Not described to species Leaves not found by Pigg, Manchester, & DeVore (2023)	
Betulaceae	Carpinus	†Carpinus perryae	Republic	A hornbeam	Carpinus parryae
Betulaceae	Corylus	Corylus johnsonii	Republic	A hazel nut	Corylus johnsonii
Betulaceae	Corylus	Unidentified	Falkland(?); Princeton	A hazel nut leaf morphospecies Not described to species	
Betulaceae	†Corylites	Undescribed	Chu Chua; Driftwood; Horsefly; Princeton; Quilchena; Republic	A hazel nut relative Not described to species	
Betulaceae	†Palaeocarpinus	†Palaeocarpinus barksdaleae	Horsefly; Republic	An extinct coryloid relative	Palaeocarpinus barksdaleae
Betulaceae	†Palaeocarpinus	†Palaeocarpinus dentatus	Horsefly; Quilchena; Stump Lake; Tranquille	An extinct coryloid relative. First described as Carpolithes dentatus	
Betulaceae	†Palaeocarpinus	†Palaeocarpinus stonebergae	Princeton	An extinct coryloid relative	
Betulaceae	†Palaeocarpinus	Undescribed	Driftwood; McAbee; Republic	Various Palaeocarpinus fruits Not described to species by modern studies formerly grouped under Carpolithes dentatus Horsefly specimens moved to P. barksdaleae (2023)	undescribed Palaeocarpinus species
Betulaceae	Cf. Corylus	Undescribed	McAbee (pollen)	A hazel nut Not described to species	
Betulaceae	Undescribed	Undescribed	Hat Creek Coal	A betulaceous taxon Not described to species	
Celtidaceae	Pteroceltis	Undescribed	Republic	A cannabaceous fruit Not described	Pteroceltis species fruit
Fagaceae	†Castaneophyllum	undescribed	Princeton; Republic	An fagaceous morphogenus Not described to species	
Fagaceae	Cf. †Castaneophyllum	undescribed	Quilchena	An fagaceous morphogenus Not described to species	
Fagaceae	†Dryophyllum	Undescribed	Quilchena	An extinct fagaceous leaf morphotype. Not described to species	
Fagaceae	†Fagopsis	†Fagopsis undulata	Horsefly; Princeton; Stump Lake; Republic	An extinct beech relative. Includes the Carpinus grandis specimens of Dawson, 1890; Horsefly specimens identified as F. undulata (2023)	Fagopsis undulata
Fagaceae	†Fagopsis	undescribed	Driftwood; Tranquille	An extinct beech relative Moved from Planera longifolia by Hollick (1909); Not identified to species	
Fagaceae	Fagus	†Fagus langevinii	Falkland; McAbee; Princeton; Republic	A beech	Fagus langevinii
Fagaceae	Fagus	Undescribed	Chu Chua	A beech	
Fagaceae	Quercus	†Quercus uglowi	Chu Chua	An oak leaf species	Quercus uglowi
Fagaceae	Quercus	undescribed	Driftwood; Falkland; Horsefly; McAbee (pollen); Quilchena; Princeton; Republic	Various oak leaves and pollen Not described to species	
Juglandaceae	Carya	Carya dawsoni	Chu Chua	A punitive hickory First described as Hicoria dawsoni (1926)	Carya dawsoni
Juglandaceae	Carya	Carya stanleyanum	Chu Chua; Quilchena	A punitive hickory First described as Dryophyllum stanleyanum (1895)	
Juglandaceae	Carya	Undescribed	Chu Chua; McAbee (pollen); Quilchena; Republic	A possible hickory Not described to species Not listed from Horsefly (2023)	
Juglandaceae	†Cruciptera	†Cruciptera simsonii	Republic	A walnut family relative.	
Juglandaceae	Juglans	Undescribed	McAbee (pollen); Princeton; Quilchena; Republic	A walnut family relative. Not described to species.	
Juglandaceae	Pterocarya	Undescribed	McAbee (pollen); Princetona; Republic	A wingnut relative. Not described to species.	
Juglandaceae	Undescribed	Undescribed	Falkland	Juglandaceous leaves Not described to genus or species	
Moraceae	Ficus?	Undescribed	Princeton	Fragmentary fig? leaves Not described	
Moraceae	Morus	Undescribed	Republic	A mulberry, two types known. Not described to species	
Moraceae	Cf. Morus	Undescribed	Horsefly	Fragmentary mulberry? leaves Not described	
Myricaceae	Comptonia	†Comptonia columbiana	Falkland; Kamloops; McAbee; Quilchena; Princeton; Republic	A comptonia species	Comptonia columbiana
Myricaceae	Comptonia	†Comptonia predryandroides	Chu Chua	A comptonia species	Comptonia predryandroides
Myricaceae	Comptonia	†Comptonia quilchenensis	Quilchena	A comptonia species Described from a single poorly preserved leaf	
Myricaceae	Comptonia	Undescribed	Chu Chua	A comptonia species not identified to species Possibly C. columbiana or C. predryandroides	
Myricaceae	Myrica	Undescribed	Horsefly?	A possible bayberry Not described to species Specimen was not mentioned by Pigg, Manchester, & DeVore (2023)	
Polygalaceae	†Deviacer	†Deviacer wolfei	Horsefly	A milkwort relative.	
Polygalaceae	†Deviacer	Undescribed	Falkland; Quilchena; Republic	A milkwort relative Not described to species Horsefly specimens moved to Deviacer wolfei (2023)	Deviacer species
Rhamnaceae	Ceanothus	Undescribed	Princeton	A ceanothus leaf Not described to species	
Rhamnaceae	Paliurus	Undescribed	Princeton	A Paliurus leaf Not described to species	
Rhamnaceae	Rhamnus	†Rhamnus quilchenensis	Horsefly?; Quilchena	A buckthorn species. Horsefly specimens not mentioned by Pigg, Manchester, & DeVore (2023)	
Rosaceae	Amelanchier	Undescribed	McAbee; Princeton; Quilchena; Republic	A service berry Not described to species	
Rosaceae	Crataegus	†Crataegus tranquillensis	Tranquille	A hawthorn leaf	
Rosaceae	Crataegus	†Crataegus tulameensis	Princeton	A hawthorn fruit	
Rosaceae	Cf. Crataegus	Undescribed	Falkland; McAbee; Princeton; Republic	A hawthorn relative Not described to species Horsefly specimens not mentioned by Pigg, Manchester, & DeVore (2023)	
Rosaceae	Cf. Hesperomeles	Undescribed	Horsefly	An Hesperomeles relative. Not described to genus or species	
Rosaceae	?Holodiscus	Undescribed	Falkland	Possible oceanspray leaves Not described to species	
Rosaceae	Kerria	Undescribed	Republic	A Japanese kerria species Not described to species.	
Rosaceae	Malus	Cf. Malus idahoensis	Falkland	An apple Not described to species	
Rosaceae	Aff. Malus	Undescribed	Republic	A maloid species possibly apple or pear Not described to species	
Rosaceae	Neviusia	†Neviusia dunthornei	Princeton	A snow-wreath	
Rosaceae	Neviusia	Undescribed	Republic	A snow-wreath Not described to species	
Rosaceae	Oemleria	†Oemleria janhartfordae	Republic	An Osoberry	
Rosaceae	†Paleorosa	†Paleorosa similkameenensis	Princeton Chert	A rose family flower	
Rosaceae	"Paraprunus"	Undescribed	Republic	An amygdaloid leaf morphotaxon Not described to genus/species Host to Cynipidae gall wasps The name "Paraprunus" is nomen nudum	
Rosaceae	Photinia	†Photinia pageae	Falkland; Horsefly; Republic	A Christmas-berry relative	Photinia pageae
Rosaceae	Photinia	Undescribed	Princeton	A Christmas-berry relative	
Rosaceae	Aff. Physocarpus	Undescribed	Princeton; Republic	A possible nine-bark Not described to species Possibly stem Neillieae	
Rosaceae	Prunus	†Prunus allenbyensis	Princeton Chert	A prunoid wood.	
Rosaceae	Prunus	†Prunus cathybrownae	Republic	A cherry flower	Prunus cathybrownae
Rosaceae	Prunus	"Princeton chert species 1"	Princeton Chert	A prunoid seed. Not described to species	
Rosaceae	Prunus	"Princeton chert species 2"	Princeton Chert	A prunoid seed. Not described to species	
Rosaceae	Prunus	"Princeton chert species 3"	Princeton Chert	A prunoid seed. Not described to species	
Rosaceae	Prunus	"Republic species 1"	Republic	A prunoid leaf. Not described to species	
Rosaceae	Prunus	"Republic species 2"	Republic	A prunoid leaf. Not described to species	
Rosaceae	Prunus	"Republic species 3"	Republic	A prunoid leaf. Not described to species	
Rosaceae	Prunus	Undescribed	Chu Chua; Falkland(?); Horsefly; Princeton; Quilchena	A prunoid leaf. Not described to species	
Rosaceae	Cf. Prunus	Undescribed	Falkland; McAbee	Amygdaloid leaves and flowers of prunoid affinity. Not described to species	
Rosaceae	Pyracantha	Undescribed	Republic	A firethorn sp. Tentative record, Not described to species.	
Rosaceae	Pyrus	Undescribed	Horsefly	A pear Not described to species	
Rosaceae	Cf. Pyrus	Undescribed	Republic	A maloid species possibly apple or pear Not described to species	
Rosaceae	Rubus	Undescribed	Horsefly; Princeton; Republic	A blackberry Not described to species	
Rosaceae	Sorbus?	†"Sorbus" decorifolia	Chu Chua	A punitive Sorbus	Sorbus? decorafolia
Rosaceae	Aff. Sorbus	Undescribed	McAbee; Princeton; Republic	A rowan relative Not described to species.	
Rosaceae	Aff. Spiraea	Undescribed	Falkland; Princeton; Republic	A bridal wreath Not described to species.	
Rosaceae	†Stonebergia	†Stonebergia columbiana	Princeton	A sorbarieous genus	Stonebergia columbiana

===== Malvids =====
Family	Genus	species	Sites	Notes	Images
Anacardiaceae	Rhus	†Rhus boothillensis	Republic	A sumac hybridized with the other Klondike Mountain Formation Rhus species	Rhus boothillensis
Anacardiaceae	Rhus	†Rhus garwellii	Republic	A sumac with leaflets on short petiolules hybridized with the other Klondike Mountain Formation Rhus species	Rhus garwellii
Anacardiaceae	Rhus	†Rhus malloryi	Falkland; Republic	A sumac with leaflets on short petiolules hybridized with the other Klondike Mountain Formation Rhus species	Rhus malloryi
Anacardiaceae	Rhus	†Rhus republicensis	Republic	A sumac with sessile leaflets hybridized with the other Klondike Mountain Formation Rhus species	
Anacardiaceae	Rhus	Undescribed	Falkland; Horsefly; McAbee?; Quilchena; Princeton	A sumac species Not described to species	
Anacardiaceae	Cf. Schinus	Undescribed	Horsefly	A Peruvian pepper tree species. Not described to species	
Burseraceae	†Barghoornia	†Barghoornia oblongifolia	Republic	An extinct Bursera relative	Barghoornia oblongifolia
Lythraceae	Decodon	†Decodon allenbyensis	Princeton Chert	A swamp loosestrife	
Lythraceae	Decodon	Undescribed	Princeton; Republic	A swamp loosestrife Not described to species	
Malvaceae	Craigia	†Craigia oregonensis	Princeton	A Craigia species	
Malvaceae	Craigia	Undescribed	Republic	A Craigia species Not described to species	Craigia sp.
Malvaceae	†Florissantia	†Florissantia quilchenensis	Falkland; Horsefly; McAbee; Quilchena; Republic	A Florissantia species	Florissantia quilchenensis
Malvaceae	†Florissantia	Undescribed	Driftwood; Princeton	A Florissantia species Not described to species Horsefly specimens identified ad F. quilchenensis (2023)	
Malvaceae	Hibiscus	Undescribed	Republic	A hibiscus Not described to species	
Malvaceae	†Plafkeria	Undescribed	Republic	A linden relative Not described to species Host to Cecidomyiidae gall midges.	
Malvaceae	Tilia	†Tilia johnsoni	Republic	A Linden	Tilia johnsoni
Malvaceae	Tilia	Undescribed	Princeton; Quilchena; Republic	A Linden relative Not described to species	Cf. Tilia fruits
Myrtaceae	†Paleomyrtinaea	†Paleomyrtinaea princetonensis	Princeton Chert	A Myrtaceous fruit	
Simaroubaceae	†Ailanthophyllum	†Ailanthophyllum incertum	Tranquille	A leaf of simaroubaceous affinity.	
Sapindaceae	Acer	Acer dubium	Horsefly	single fruit missing a seed. Provisionally named by Penhallow (1902); Deemed nomen nudum by LaMotte (1952) not mentioned by Pigg, Manchester, & DeVore (2023)	
Sapindaceae	Acer	†Acer hillsi	Republic	A maple samara.	
Sapindaceae	Acer	†Acer princetonense	Princeton	A maple samara morphospecies.	
Sapindaceae	Acer	†Acer republicense	Republic	A maple samara morphospecies.	
Sapindaceae	Acer	†Acer rousei	McAbee; Princeton	A maple samara morphospecies.	
Sapindaceae	Acer	†Acer spitzi	Republic	A maple samara morphospecies.	
Sapindaceae	Acer	†Acer stewarti	McAbee; Princeton	A maple leaf and samara species.	
Sapindaceae	Acer	†Acer stockeyae	Princeton	A maple samara morphospecies.	
Sapindaceae	Acer	†Acer stonebergae	Princeton; Republic	A maple samara morphospecies.	
Sapindaceae	Acer	†Acer toradense	Princeton; Republic	A maple samara morphospecies.	
Sapindaceae	Acer	†Acer washingtonense	Republic	A maple leaf and samara species.	
Sapindaceae	Acer	†Acer wehri	Chu Chua; McAbee; Princeton; Quilchena; Republic	A maple samara morphospecies.	Acer wehri
Sapindaceae	Acer	Undescribed	Chu Chua; Driftwood; Falkland; Horsefly; McAbee; Princeton; Quilchena	Various maple leaves and seeds. Not described to species Leaves host to Cynipidae gall wasps	
Sapindaceae	Aesculus	Undescribed	Falkland; McAbee; Princeton; Republic	A horse chestnut Not described to species. Possible nuts with a "hard and resisting shell" were reported by Penhallow (1908) from the Tulameen River.	
Sapindaceae	†Bohlenia	†Bohlenia americana	Falkland; Republic	A soap berry genus	Bohlenia americana
Sapindaceae	†Bohlenia	† Cf. Bohlenia insignis	Chu Chua	A soap berry genus First described as Myrica uglowi	Cf. Bohlenia insignis
Sapindaceae	†Bohlenia	Undescribed	Quilchena	A soap berry genus Not described	
Sapindaceae	Dipteronia	†Dipteronia brownii	Chu Chua; Driftwood; Falkland; Horsefly; McAbee; Princeton; Quilchena; Republic	A Dipteronia species	Dipteronia brownii
Sapindaceae	Koelreuteria	†Koelreuteria dilcheri	Horsefly; Republic	A Koelreuteria species	Koelreuteria dilcheri
Sapindaceae	Koelreuteria	Undescribed		A Koelreuteria species	
Sapindaceae	†Wehrwolfea	†Wehrwolfea striata	Princeton Chert	A possible dodonaecous soapberry family flower	
Sapindaceae	Cf. Boniodendron	†"Koelreuteria" arnoldii	Falkland; McAbee; Princeton; Republic	A sapindaceous species first described as a Koelreuteria species, considered Cf. Boniodendron by Wang et al. (2012).	"Koelreuteria" arnoldii
Ulmaceae	†Cedrelospermum	Undescribed	Horsefly; Quilchena; Republic	An elm relative Not described to species	
Ulmaceae	†Ulminium	†Ulminium columbianum	Kettle River	An elm wood species. Moved from Ulmus columbiana in 1922	Ulminium columbianum
Ulmaceae	Ulmus	†Ulmus chuchuanus	Chu Chua; Driftwood; Falkland; Quilchena; Republic	An elm Originally named Ulmus columbianus Leaves and fruits first tentatively identified as Chaetaptelea and Zelkova	Ulmus chuchuanus
Ulmaceae	Ulmus	†Ulmus okanaganensis	Chu Chua; Driftwoodd; Falkland; McAbee; Quilchena; Republic	An elm	Ulmus okanaganensis
Ulmaceae	Ulmus	†Ulmus protoamericana	Kettle River	An elm wood species.	Ulmus protoamericana
Ulmaceae	Ulmus	†Ulmus protoracemosa	Kettle River	An elm wood species.	Ulmus protoracemosa
Ulmaceae	Ulmus	Undescribed	Driftwood; Falkland; Horsefly; Princeton; Quilchena	Various Elm leaves or fruits Not described to species	

===== Saxifragales and basal Superrosids =====
Family	Genus	species	Sites	Notes	Images
Cercidiphyllaceae	Cercidiphyllum	†Cercidiphyllum obtritum	Princeton; Republic	A katsura with suggested affinity to †Joffrea, First described as "Populus" obtrita	Cercidiphyllum obtritum
Cercidiphyllaceae	Unidentified	Unidentified	Chu Chua; Driftwood; Falkland; McAbee; Princeton; Quilchena	A katsura relative with suggested affinity to †Joffrea or †Nyssydium; Horsefly specimens listed as Trochodendroides (2023)	undescribed Cercidiphyllaceous fruits
Cercidiphyllaceae	†Jenkinsella	Undescribed	Horsefly	A katsura fruit with suggested affinity to †Joffrea or †Nyssydium	
Cercidiphyllaceae	†Trochodendroides	Undescribed	Horsefly	A katsura leaf with suggested affinity to †Joffrea or †Nyssydium	
Grossulariaceae	Ribes	Undescribed	Princeton Chert	A current fruit Not described	
Grossulariaceae	Ribes	Undescribed	Falkland; McAbee; Princeton; Republic	A current Not described to species Two morphotypes present at Republic	
Hamamelidaceae	Corylopsis	†Corylopsis reedae	Republic	A winter-hazel	Corylopsis reedae
Hamamelidaceae	Corylopsis	Undescribed	Princeton; Quilchena	A winter-hazel Not described to species	
Hamamelidaceae	Fothergilla	†Fothergilla malloryi	Princeton; Republic	A witch alder	Fothergilla malloryi
Iteaceae	Itea	Undescribed	Republic	A Virginia willow species Not described to species.	
Iteaceae	Cf. Itea	undescribed	Falkland	A Virginia willow-like leaf Not described to genus or species.	
Vitaceae	Ampelocissus	†"Ampelocissus" similkameenensis	Princeton Chert	A grape family fruit of uncertain generic placement	
Vitaceae	incertae sedis	"Type 1"	Princeton Chert	A grape family fruit of uncertain generic placement Not described	
Vitaceae	incertae sedis	"Type 2"	Princeton Chert	A grape family fruit of uncertain generic placement Not described	
Vitaceae	Unidentified	Unidentified	Falkland; McAbee; Princeton; Republic	Vitoideae leaves/seeds In the Ampelocissus/Cissus/Vitis group Not described to species	

==== Incertae sedis ====
Family	Genus	species	Sites	Notes	Images
Incertae sedis	†Averrhoites	Undescribed	Falkland; Horsefly; McAbee; Princeton; Republic	A leaf morphotype of uncertain affiliation Not described to species	
incertae sedis	†Calycites	†Calycites ardtunensis	Republic	A winged fruit of unidentified affinities	Calycites ardtunensis
Incertae sedis	†Chaneya	†Chaneya tenuis	McAbee; Princeton	A sapindalean flower of uncertain affiliations	Chaneya tenuis
Incertae sedis	†Eorhiza	†Eorhiza arnoldii	Princeton Chert	A semi-aquatic dicot of uncertain affinity.	
Incertae sedis	†Lagokarpos	†Lagokarpos lacustris	Horsefly	A fruit of uncertain affiliation	
Incertae sedis	†Pistillipollenites	†Pistillipollenites macgregorii	Horsefly	A palynomorph uncertain affiliation produced by Pistillipollianthus wilsoni flowers.	
Incertae sedis	†Pistillipollianthus	†Pistillipollianthus wilsoni	Horsefly	A flower of uncertain affiliation producer of the Pistillipollenites macgregorii palynomorph.	
Incertae sedis	†Pteroheterochrosperma	†Pteroheterochrosperma horseflyensis	Horsefly; McAbee; Republic	A winged fruit of uncertain affinity First placed as Ulmus minuta by Penhallow (1908); Also found in the Kishenehn Formation	Pteroheterochrosperma horseflyensis
incertae sedis	†Pteronepelys	†Pteronepelys wehrii	Republic	A samara of uncertain affinities.	Pteronepelys wehrii
incertae sedis	†Republica	†Republica hickeyi	Republic	An incertae sedis angiosperm possibly of hamamelid affiliations	Republica hickeyi
Incertae sedis	incertae sedis	†"Acer" negundifolium (Dawson) LaMotte (1952)	Stump Lake	Leaf fragments of a "problematic nature" First named Acerites negundifolium (1891); Wolfe and Tanai (1986) rejected the placement in Acer	

== Fungi ==
A number of fungi have been preserved within the Princeton Chert, though only three have been formally described as of 2024. The first instance of ectomycorrhizae in the fossil record was reported by LePage et al. (1997) who documented mycorrhizal rootlets associated with Pinus roots.

Order	Genus	species	Sites	Notes	Images
Dothideales	†Palaeoserenomyces	†Palaeoserenomyces allenbyensis	Princeton Chert	An ascomycetan fungus on the host palm Uhlia allenbyensis	
Jahnulales	Xylomyces	undescribed	Princeton Chert	A jahnulalean fungi. Noted to be similar to Xylomyces giganteus. In situ decomposer of Eorhiza arnoldii	
Microascales	Culcitalna	undescribed	Princeton Chert	A microascalean fungi. Noted to be similar to Culcitalna achraspora. In situ decomposer of Eorhiza arnoldii	
Microascales	Thielaviopsis	undescribed	Princeton Chert	A microascalean fungi. Noted to be similar to Thielaviopsis basicola. In situ decomposer of Eorhiza arnoldii	
Pleosporales	†Cryptodidymosphaerites	†Cryptodidymosphaerites princetonensis	Princeton Chert	An ascomycetan fungus hosted on Uhlia allenbyensis	
Pleosporales	†Monodictysporites	†Monodictysporites princetonensis	Princeton Chert	An ascomycotan fungus hosted on Dennstaedtiopsis aerenchymata	
Undescribed	Undescribed	Undescribed	Princeton chert	Ectomycorrhizae associated with Pinus roots Similar to the modern genera Rhizopogon and Suillus	

== Taxa of uncertain modern identification ==
A number of taxa identified or described by Penhallow (1902, 1906, 1908) and Berry (1926) have not received much or any modern attention, resulting in uncertainty of taxon affiliation, identification, or synonymy. Many late 1800's to early 1900's identifications of Okanagan highlands fossils were made based on geologic age assumptions ranging between the Miocene to Pliocene, and often specimens were grouped into species bins for taxa first described from Europe.

Family	Species	Reporting Author	Sites	Notes	Images
Adoxaceae	†"Viburnum antiquum" (Newberry) Hollick	Berry, 1926	Chu Chua	First named as a viburnum leaf morphotype British Columbian specimens rejected from species by Manchester 2002	
Adoxaceae	†Viburnum dentoni Lesquereux	Penhallow, 1908	Tranquille	A viburnum leaf morphotype	
Araliaceae	Aralia acerifolia Lesquereux	Penhallow, 1908	Quilchena	Fragmentary leaves. jr synonym of Macginitiea nobilis.	
Araliaceae	Aralia notata Lesquereux	Penhallow, 1902	Horsefly; Quilchena; Tulameen (Princeton)	Fragmentary leaves. jr synonym of Macginitiea nobilis.	
Betulaceae	Alnus alaskana Newberry	Penhallow, 1908	Tulameen (Princeton)	Fragmentary leaves Type locality Kootznahoo islands, Alaska (Miocene?)	
Betulaceae	Alnus carpinoides Lesquereux	Penhallow, 1908	Horsefly; Tranquille (Princeton)	Fragmentary leaves Type locality Bridge Creek, Oregon (Miocene?)	
Betulaceae	Alnus serrulata fossilis Newberry	Penhallow, 1908	Quilchena	Fragmentary leaves "Miocene of Western North America"	
Betulaceae	Betula angustifolia Newberry	Penhallow, 1908	Quilchena	Leaves. Type locality Bridge Creek, Oregon	
Betulaceae	Betula heterodonta Newberry	Penhallow, 1908	Quilchena; Tulameen (Princeton)	Leaves and one possible cone. Type locality Bridge Creek, Oregon	
Betulaceae	Betula macrophylla Göppert	Penhallow, 1908	Tulameen (Princeton)	Fragmetary leaves with cones. Type locality Europe	
Betulaceae	Betula stevensoni Lesquereux	Penhallow, 1902	Horsefly; Similkameen	Fragmentary leaves Type locality Laramie, Wyoming	
Betulaceae	Carpinus grandis Unger ex Heer	Dawson, 1890	Quilchena; Similkameen; Stump Lake; Tranquille; Tulameen		
Betulaceae	Corylus americana walt	Penhallow, 1908	Horsefly; Quilchena; Tranquille	A hazel nut	
Cercidiphyllaceae	†Cercidiphyllum arcticum	Dawson, 1879	Chu Chua; Horsefly; Quilchena; Princeton	A katsura leaf morphotype Moved from Trochodendroides arctica (1926); Also includes: "Grewia crenata" of Penhallow (1908); "Populus arctica" of Penhallow (1908); "Populus daphnogenoides" of Dawson (1891); "Populus genatrix" of Penhallow (1908); Populus rotundifolia of Penhallow (1908)	
Cercidiphyllaceae	Jenkinsella arctica (Heer) Golovneva & Alekseev	Berry, 1926	Chu Chua	A katsura like fruit morphospecies Moved from Leguminosites arachioides IncludesLeguminosites borealis, (illegitimate jr syn)	
Cornaceae	†Cornophyllum nebrascensis (Schimper) McIver & Basinger	Penhallow, 1908	Quilchena	A punitive dogwood relative First reported as "Cornus newberryi"	
Cornaceae	†Cornus suborbifera Lesquereux?	Penhallow, 1908	Princeton; Quilchena	A dogwood	
Cupressaceae	†Thuja interrupta Newberry	Penhallow, 1908	Princeton; Quilchena	Type locality Fort Union Formation, North Dakota; An arborvite species	
Cyperaceae	†Cyperacites haydenii	Penhallow, 1907	Kettle River	A monocot of uncertain affinity	
Ericaceae	Andromeda delicatula Lesquereux	Penhallow, 1908	Quilchena	Two Ericaceae? leaves Type locality Green River Formation	
Fagaceae	†Castanea castanaefolia (Unger) Knowlton	Penhallow, 1902	Horsefly	Fragmentary leaves.	
Fagaceae	†Castanea intermedia? Lesquereux	Penhallow, 1908	Quilchena	Single fragmentary specimen	
Fagaceae	†Castanopsis perplexa (Knowlton) Brown	Penhallow, 1908	Quilchena	Single fragmentary specimen Specimen published as Salix perplexa	
Fagaceae	†Quercus castanopsis Newberry	Penhallow, 1908	Quilchena	Type locality Fort Union Formation, Montana; An oak leaf morphotype.	
Fagaceae	†Quercus consimilis Newberry	Penhallow, 1908	Quilchena	Type locality Bridge Creek Flora, Oregon; An oak leaf morphotype.	
Fagaceae	†Quercus dallii Lesquereux	Dawson, 1891	Princeton	Type locality Cook Inlet, Alaska; An oak leaf morphotype.	
Fagaceae	†Quercus groenlandica Heer	Berry, 1926	Chu Chua	Type locality Greenland	
Fagaceae	†Quercus penhallowi Trelease	Penhallow, 1908	Princeton	Type locality Fort Union Formation, North Dakota; An oak leaf morphotype. First identified under the homonym Quercus laurifolia (Newberry)	
Ginkgoaceae	†Ginkgo digitata (Brongn.) Heer	Penhallow, 1908	Quilchena	A ginkgo leaf mophospecies.	
Juglandaceae	†Carya antiquorum Newberry	Penhallow, 1908	Horsefly; Quilchena; Tranquille	A Carya leaf morphospecies	
Juglandaceae	†Juglans nigella Heer	Dawson, 1876	Horsefly	Type locality Cook Inlet, Alaska; A walnut leaf morphospecies.	
Juglandaceae	†Juglans occidentalis Newberry	Penhallow, 1908	Horsefly	Type locality Green River Formation, Wyoming; A walnut leaf morphospecies.	
Juglandaceae	†Juglans rhamnoides Lesquereux	Penhallow, 1908	Tranquille	Type locality Evanston, Utah; A walnut leaf morphospecies.	
Lauraceae	†Cinnamomum affine Lesquereux	Dawson, 1890	Horsefly; Princeton; Tranquille	A cinnamon leaf morphospecies	
Malvaceae	†Pterospermites alaskana Knowlton	Berry, 1926	Chu Chua	Type locality Keni Formation; A leaf morphospecies of possible sterculioid affinity	
Moraceae	Ficus asarifolia? Ettingshausen	Penhallow, 1908	Princeton	Type locality Most Basin Bílina Czech Republic; A possible fig leaf morphospecies.	
Moraceae	Ficus asiminaefolia Lesquereux	Penhallow, 1908	Princeton; Tranquille	Type locality "Rock Corral", California; A possible fig leaf morphospecies.	
Moraceae	Ficus decandolleana Heer	Penhallow, 1908	Quilchena	Type locality Monod, Switzerland; A possible fig leaf morphospecies.	
Moraceae	Ficus populina Heer	Penhallow, 1908	Horsefly; Princeton	Type locality Monod, Switzerland; A possible fig leaf morphospecies.	
Moraceae	Ficus ungeri Lesquereux	Penhallow, 1908	Quilchena	Type locality Green River Formation, Wyoming; A possible fig leaf morphospecies.	
Musaceae	Musophyllum complicatum Lesquereux	Penhallow, 1908; Berry, 1926	Chu Chua; Princeton	A monocot morphogenus	
Myricaceae	†Comptonia dryandroides Unger	Penhallow, 1908	Princeton; Quilchena	A Comptonia leaf morphospecies	
Myricaceae	†Comptonia partita (Lesquereux) Berry	Penhallow, 1908	Princeton	A Comptonia leaf morphospecies Possibly closely allied to C. columbiana	
Myricaceae	†Myrica (?) personata Knowlton	Penhallow, 1908	Horsefly	Type locality Fossil, Oregon; A bayberry species	
Onocleaceae	†Onoclea hebridica (Forbes) Bell	Penhallow, 1908	Horsefly	Type locality Isle of Mull, UK; A bead fern Listed as "Onoclea sensibilis" sensu Newberry	
Osmundaceae	†Osmunda heeri Gaudin	Penhallow, 1908	Princeton	Type locality Rivaz, Switzerland; A royal fern	
Pinaceae	†Pinus lardyana Heer	Penhallow, 1908	Quilchena	Type locality Switzerland; A pine cone morphospecies	
Poaceae	†Phragmites alaskana Heer	Berry, 1926	Chu Chua	A grass/sedge leaf morphogenus	
Poaceae	†Poacites tenuistriatus Heer	Berry, 1926	Chu Chua	A grass/sedge leaf morphogenus	
Potamogetonaceae	Potamogeton (?) verticillatus Lesquereux	Penhallow, 1908	Princeton	Type locality Florissant, Colorado; A punitive Potamogeton leaf morphospecies.	
Rhamnaceae	†Rhamnus belmontensis Knowlton & Cockerell	Penhallow, 1908	Horsefly; Quilchena	Type locality Laramie, Colorado; A buckthorn species First identified under the homonym Rhamnus elegans Newberry	
Rhamnaceae	†Rhamnus eridani Unger	Penhallow, 1908	Horsefly; Quilchena	Type locality Disco Island, Greenland, A buckthorn species	
Rhamnaceae	†Rhamnus gaudini Heer	Penhallow, 1908	Quilchena	Type locality Switzerland, A buckthorn species	
Rosaceae	†Prunus (?) merriami Knowlton	Penhallow, 1908	Quilchena	Type locality Mascall Formation, Oregon; A punitive cherry leaf morphospecies	
Rutaceae	†Zanthoxylum spireaefolium Lesquereux	Penhallow, 1908	Quilchena	Type locality Florissant, Colorado; A rutaceous leaf morphospecies	
Salicaceae	†Populus cordata Newberry	Penhallow, 1908	Princeton; Quilchena	Type locality Fort Union Formation, Montana; A cottonwood leaf morphotype.	
Salicaceae	†Populus latior Braun	Dawson, 1879	Princeton; Horsefly	Type locality Europe; A cottonwood leaf morphotype. Includes one subspecies P. l. cordifolia.	
Salicaceae	†Populus mutabilis crenata Heer	Penhallow, 1908	Quilchena; Tranquille	Type locality Switzerland; A cottonwood leaf morphotype.	
Salicaceae	†Populus polymorpha Newberry	Penhallow, 1908	Quilchena	Type locality Bridge Creek, Oregon; A cottonwood leaf morphotype.	
Salicaceae	†Populus zaddachi Heer	Penhallow, 1908	Princeton; Tranquille	Type locality Samland, Russia; A cottonwood leaf morphotype.	
Salicaceae	†Salix varians Goeppert	Penhallow, 1908	Horsefly; Tranquille	Type locality Europe; A willow species	
Sapindaceae	†Acer chaneyi Knowlton	Penhallow, 1908	Horsefly	Type locality Mascall Formation, Oregon; A single incomplete leaf. First identified as Acer trilobatum productum (Braun) Heer	
Taxaceae	†Taxites olriki Heer	Penhallow, 1908	Quilchena	Type locality Atanekerdluk, Greenland; A yew needle morphospecies.	
Typhaceae	†Typha lesquereuxi Cockerell	Penhallow, 1908	Horsefly; Princeton; Tranquille	Type locality Florissant, Colorado; A cattail morphospecies	
Ulmaceae	†Planera lingualis Knowlton & Cockerell	Penhallow, 1908	Horsefly	Type locality Fort Union Formation, Wyoming; A planera species First identified under the homonym Planera crenata (Newberry)	
Ulmaceae	†Ulmus minuta Goeppert	Penhallow, 1908	Horsefly; Princeton	Type locality Germany; An elm species	
Ulmaceae	†Ulmus speciosa Newberry	Penhallow, 1908	Horsefly; Quilchena	Type locality Bridge Creek, Oregon; An elm species	
Ulmaceae	†Ulmus tenuinervis Lesquereux	Penhallow, 1908	Tranquille	Type locality Middle Park, Colorado; An elm species	
Vitaceae	†Vitis alaskana Cockerell?	Penhallow, 1908	Quilchena	Type locality Admiralty Inlet, Alaska; A grape leaf morphospecies Tentatively identified under the homonym Vitis rotundifolia (Newberry)	
Vitaceae	†Vitis olriki Heer?	Penhallow, 1908	Horsefly	Type locality Atanekerdluk, Greenland; A grape leaf morphospecies Tentatively identified under the homonym Vitis rotundifolia (Newberry)	
Incertae sedis	†"Acer" grahamensis Knowlton & Cockerell	Berry, 1926	Chu Chua; Princeton; Stump Lake	Type locality Port Graham, Alaska; Fragmentary leaf fossils rejected from Acer by Wolfe & Tanai (1986); First identified as Acer macropterum (Heer)	
Incertae sedis	†Leguminosites arachioides Lesquereux	Penhallow, 1908	Horsefly; Princeton	Type locality is Evanston, Wyoming; A fruit of uncertain family affinity	
