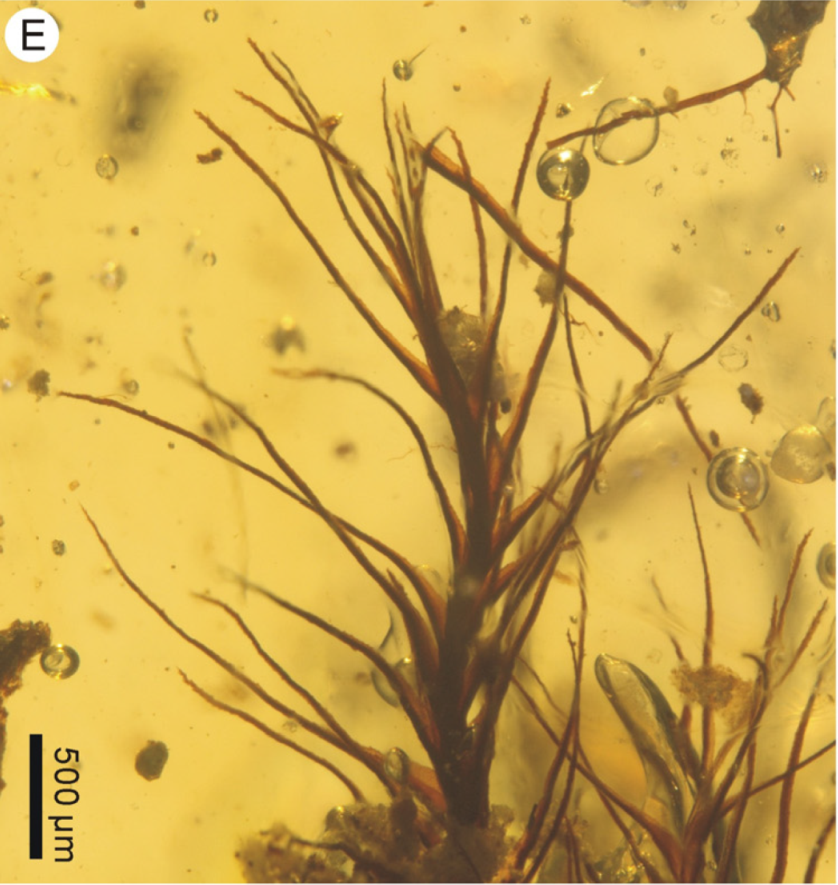
- †Ditrichites aristatus leaves

Scientific classification
- Kingdom: Plantae
- Division: Bryophyta
- Class: Bryopsida
- Subclass: Dicranidae
- Order: Ditrichales
- Family: incertae sedis
- Genus: †Ditrichites; Kuc, 1974

Species
- †D. aristatus; †D. fylesi; †D. ignotus

= Ditrichites =

Ditrichites Temporal range: Latest Albian – Late Eocene 100 mya – 39 mya

Genus of fossil mosses

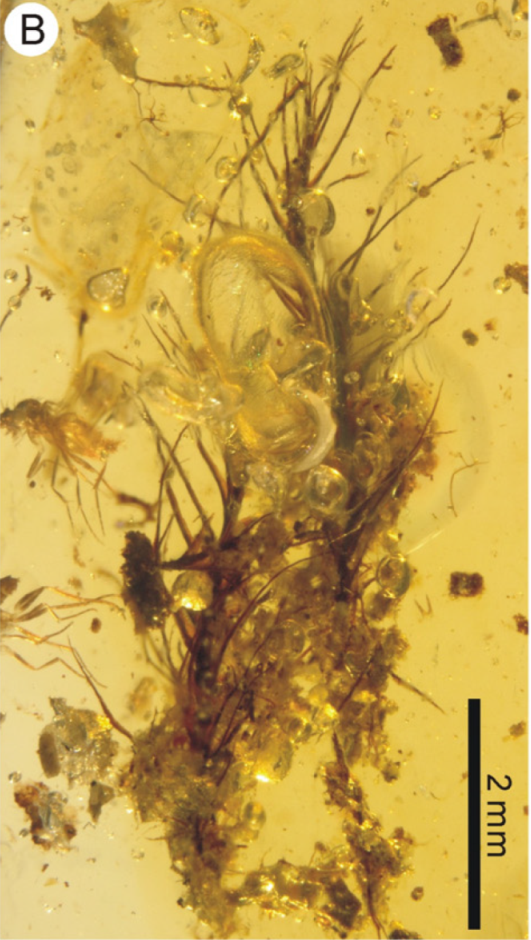
Whole Ditrichites aristatus plants with soil

Ditrichites is an extinct genus of ditrichalean moss described from compression and amber fossils. The genus was first named in 1974 from the compression species Ditrichites fylesi found in the Early Eocene of British Columbia, Canada. Both additional species have been described from inclusions in amber. The second species, and first amber species, Ditrichites ignotus was named from Late Eocene Baltic amber in northern Europe in 2015. The third named and oldest species, Ditrichites aristatus was identified in 2025 based on mid-Cretaceous age Kachin amber out of Myanmar. Given the preserved material, at least one species was suggested to be a terrestrial, ground dwelling, moss.

== Distribution ==
The oldest occurrence of Ditrichites is from the Kachin amber deposits in Kachin state, northern Myanmar. The specimens were recovered from a series of mines 20 km (12 mi) southwest of the village Tanai in the Hukuang Valley. Considered the largest deposit of Cretaceous amber known, the amber has been dated to the late Albian–early Cenomanian boundary 100–99 Mya.

The first specimens described were collected in the Eocene Okanagan Highlands of British Columbia, Canada. The Allenby Formation outcropping, located 9 km (5.6 mi) to the north of Princeton, which Hills and Halfdan Baadsgaard divided into three distinct floral zones. The mosses were preserved in the upper section of what they called the "bisaccate zone", which is dominated by distinct gymnosperm pollen with double sacci. Since then the fossil-bearing strata of the formation have been radiometrically dated to give an estimate of the Ypresian, the mid stage of the early Eocene with a revised oldest age estimate of 51.85 ± 0.85 million years ago based on detrital zircon isotopic data published in 2021.

The youngest fossil assigned to Ditrichites is from Baltic amber that was collected from sites along the Baltic Sea coast. The amber piece was one of a number of specimens that were obtained from the commercial collecting and reselling industry, with no specific site information where it was collected at. Baltic Amber as a whole is dated to around the late Eocene, 37.7 to 33.9 million years ago often the Priabonian, based on primary deposits in the Prussian Formation.

== History and classification ==
The Allenby Formation was visited in the 1960s by Len V. Hills of the Geological Survey Of Canada who collected a number of fossils. Of that material, the possible bryophyte specimens were passed to bryologist Marian Kuc who studied and named five new species and one new genus. A total of fifteen slabs with the best preserved mosses were added to the GSC collections. Kuc used a series of examination techniques to examine the specimens, photographic with fingernail polish, mechanical with Hoyer solution and the hydrofloric acid method. One specimen, GSC-No. 34741 was subjected to examination using mechanical preparation. A small fragment of leaf being lifted from the part side and then suspended in a microscope slide cup via Hoyer solution in the cup which was subsequently accessioned as GSC-No. 34742. In his 1974 paper Kuc chose to erect the new genus Ditrichites, with the name coming from the fossils apparent similarity to the living family Ditrichaceae and living genus Ditrichum. He coined the specific epithet fylesi as a patronym honoring John G. Fyles of the Geological Survey of Canada.

In 2015 a small group of Baltic amber fossils was detailed by bryologist Jan-Peter Frahm and paleontologist Carsten Gröhn both of Germany. In the group was an isolated non-reproductive moss fragment which had been in the Gröhn collection as #5829 and was subsequently transferred to the University of Hamburg as #4411. Based on the morphology Frahm considered the specimen possibly close in relation to Ditrichum. Due to the difficulty separating that genus from Dicranella in the family Dicranaceae even with living sterile plants, Ditrichites was chosen for the genus placement of the new species D. ignotus. Frahm did not give an explanation for the specific epithet.

In 2025 a small group of specimens was detailed by paleontologist Zhen-Zhen Tan of the Jiangsu Academy of Agricultural Sciences leading a team of researchers. Among the Burmese amber material documented was a small group of five plants in three amber kernels that did not match known Burmese amber mosses. The holotype, PB203872a, and two of the paratypes, PB203872b and PB203872c, being synclusions. Conversely the remaining two paratypes, PB203873 and PB203874, are separate pieces. All the material was deposited into the Nanjing Institute of Geology and Palaeontology collections and the description of the fossils happened in an article in MDPI journal Plants. The species descriptions were authored by bryologist Ya Li, who chose to include the new species within Ditrichites as D. aristatus. The specific name aristatus was chosen in reference to the "long, awn-like leaf apex" morphology. As with the other two species, placement of D. aristatus was based on similarity to both Ditrichaceae and Dicranaceae. The fossils are sterile and are close to the genera Dicranella, Ditrichum, and Pleuridium. as such the form genus Ditrichites was deemed the most appropriate placement.

== Species description ==
=== D. aristatus ===
Ditrichites aristatus is the most completely known of the described species, with small but full plants preserved in amber. The mosses have an upright growth habit with the unbranched stems growing between 5.4–8.7 mm (0.21–0.34 in) tall. They are found as both singular plants and as tufted groups with attached soil particles. The leaves grow from the stems in a spiral pattern with an ovate base that sheaths the stem that narrows from base to apex. With total leaf lengths between 0.9–2.0 mm (0.035–0.079 in) and a maximum width of 0.13 mm (0.0051 in) the leaves have a distinct linear-lanceolate shape that tapers to a long aristate tip. The margins are finely toothed.

=== D. fylesi ===
The leaves of D. fylesi are smaller than D. aristatus with lengths up to only 3 mm (0.12 in) and a width of 0.3 mm (0.012 in). The outline is an elongated lancolate shape where the widest point is situated at the middle of each leaf then slowly narrowing down towards the tip while the base flairs into sheath around the stem. The margin is entire, not showing any teeth, and in the upper portion curls to present a cymbiform cross-section.

=== D. ignotus ===
Known from a single plant apex, the D. ignotus specimen is 3.5 mm (0.14 in) long indicating a likely upright growth posture. As with the other two species, the leaves start as a sheath around the main stem, however unlike the others, the leaves narrow immediately down to a slender form resulting in a fine needle like leaf tip. The margins are mostly smooth with a few isolated scattered teeth near the leaf tips. The central midrib cells are thick and fill the entire leaf near the tip, showing prominently on the upper surface and bearing warty to nipple like projections along the underside surface.

== Paleoecology ==
Only Ditrichites aristatus has possible paleoecology reported. Based on the inclusion of soil particulates in the root masses of several specimens, Tan and coauthors suggested that the species was a ground dwelling moss and not an epiphyte as the other species they described were.

== Paleoenvironment ==
The Princeton site is part of a larger fossil site system collectively known as the Eocene Okanagan Highlands. The highlands, including the Early Eocene lacustrine formations between Driftwood Canyon at the north and Republic at the south, have been described as one of the "Great Canadian Lagerstätten" based on the diversity, quality and unique nature of the paleofloral and paleofaunal biotas that are preserved. The highlands temperate biome that is preserved across a large transect of lakes records many of the earliest appearances of modern genera, while also documenting the last stands of ancient lines. The warm temperate highland floras in association with downfaulted lacustrine basins and active volcanism are noted to have no exact modern equivalents. This is due to the more seasonally equitable conditions of the Early Eocene, resulting in much lower seasonal temperature shifts. However, the highlands have been compared to the upland ecological islands in the Virunga Mountains within the Albertine Rift of the African rift valley.

The Baltic Amber forest is comprised of an angiosperm and conifer mesophytic-mix similar to the modern subtropical forests growing around southeastern and eastern Asia. Ecological investigations show the landscape of the forest encompassing intermingled costal and riparian forests with back and coastal swamp areas. Grass and carnivorous plant fossils indicate that sunny open areas were a notable component of the forest, with dwarf mistletoe driven canopy gap generation a likely contributor to the openings.

The Burmese amber paleoforest is considered to have been a tropical rainforest, situated near the coast, where resin was subsequently transported into a shallow marine environment. The shell of a dead juvenile Puzosia (Bhimaites) ammonite, marine gastropod shells and littoral or supralittoral area isopods entombed in a piece of amber with shell sand, along with growth of crinoids, corals and oysters on the surface of some amber pieces indicate marine conditions for final deposition. However the presence of numerous freshwater insects suggests that the initial environment of deposition was a downstream estuarine to freshwater section of a river, with the forests extending across coastal rivers, river deltas, lakes, lagoons, and coastal bays. The forest environment may have been prone to fire, similar to modern tropical peat swamps, based on the presence of fire adapted plants and burned plant remains found in the amber.
