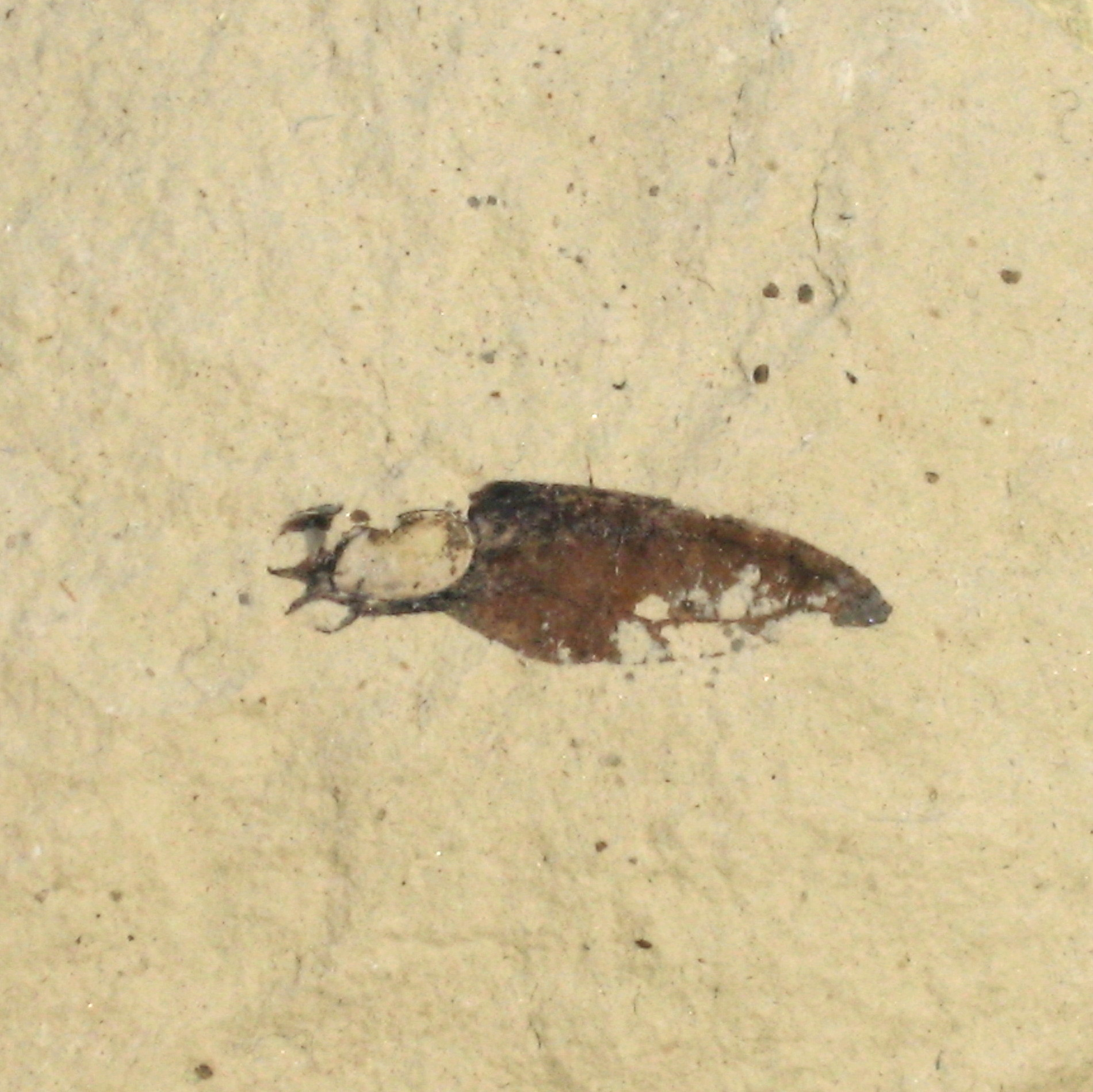
- Fossil Pteronepelys wehrii fruit

Scientific classification
- Kingdom: Plantae
- Clade: Tracheophytes
- Clade: Angiosperms
- Order: incertae sedis
- Genus: †Pteronepelys; Manchester, 1994
- Species: †P. wehrii

Binomial name
- †Pteronepelys wehrii Manchester, 1994

= Pteronepelys =

Pteronepelys Temporal range: 49.5–44 Ma

Fossil genus of plants

Pteronepelys, sometimes known as the winged stranger, is an extinct genus of flowering plant of uncertain affinities, which contains the one species, Pteronepelys wehrii. It is known from isolated fossil seeds found in middle Eocene sediments exposed in north central Oregon and Ypresian-age fossils found in Washington, US.

== Distribution and paleoecology ==
Pteronepelys wehrii has been identified from two locations in the Clarno Formation, the leaf layer in the Clarno nut beds, type locality for the species plus the White Cliffs. The nut beds are approximately 3 kilometres (1.9 mi) east of the unincorporated community of Clarno, Oregon, while the White Cliffs locality is south of Clarno, and both considered to be middle Eocene in age. The dating is based on averaging zircon fission track radiometric dating which yielded an age of 43.7 ± 0.1 million years ago and Argon–argon dating radiometric dating which yielded a 36.38 ± 1.31 million years ago to 46.8 ± 3.36 million years ago date. The average of the dates resulted in an age range of 2 million years ago. The beds are composed of silica and calcium carbonate cemented tuffaceous sandstones, siltstones, and conglomerates which preserve either a lake delta environment, or alternatively periodic floods and volcanic mudflows preserved with hot spring activity.

Five additional specimens were studied from a location in the Eocene Okanagan Highlands, an outcrop of the Ypresian Klondike Mountain Formation in Republic. The formation preserves an upland lake system surrounded by a mixed conifer–broadleaf forest with nearby volcanism. The pollen flora has notable elements of birch and golden larch, and distinct trace amounts of fir, spruce, cypress, and palm. Wolfe and Tanai (1987) interpreted the forest climate to have been microthermal, having distinct seasonal temperature swings which dipped below freezing in the winters. However, further study has shown the lake system was surrounded by a warm temperate ecosystem that likely had a mesic upper microthermal to lower mesothermal climate, in which winter temperatures rarely dropped low enough for snow, and which were seasonably equitable.

It was likely wind-dispersed seed, and possibly part of the canopy flora of the forests, however the affinities of Pteronepelys with other flowering plants were unknown at the time of description.

== History and classification ==
The Pteronepelys wehrii specimens were studied by paleobotanist Steven R. Manchester of the University of Florida. He published his 1994 type description for P. wehrii in the Journal Palaeontographica Americana. The genus and species were described from a series of type specimens, the holotype specimen OMSI PM018, which was preserved in the paleobotanical collections of the Oregon Museum of Science and Industry in Portland, Oregon, and seven paratype specimens. Of the paratypes, one is housed in the University of Florida collections, a second is in the OMSI collections, with the remaining five in the Burke Museum paleontology collections.

The genus name Pteronepelys is a combination of the Greek word elements Pteron meaning "wing" and epelys roughly translating to "stranger", while Manchester coined the specific epithet wehrii in honor of paleobotanist and artist Wesley Wehr, in recognition of contribution of the Klondike Mountain Formation specimens. The genus has been occasionally given the vernacular name "winged stranger" as a result of the genus name.

== Description ==
Pteronepelys wehrii samaras are elongated and flattened sideways, with an elliptical wing that joins to an ovoid endocarp. The nutlets are 3.5 mm–4.5 mm × 2.6 mm–3.0 mm (0.14 in–0.18 in × 0.10 in–0.12 in) with an estimated thickness between 2–2.5 mm (0.079–0.098 in). The tip of the nutlet sports four to five short sepals which are 1.5 mm × 1.5 mm (0.059 in × 0.059 in) with round tips. In the middle of the nutlet tip are two central styles. The 10.0–13.9 mm (0.39–0.55 in) wing has a convex lower margin and a convex to straight upper margin which meet at the basal end of the samara at a point where it would have connected to the parent plant. Three veins run the length of the wing, arising from the basal wingtip and merging onto the nutlet. Thick veins follow along the upper margin and cross the midline of the wing, while a third, thin vein curves parallel to the lower margin between the midvein and margin.
