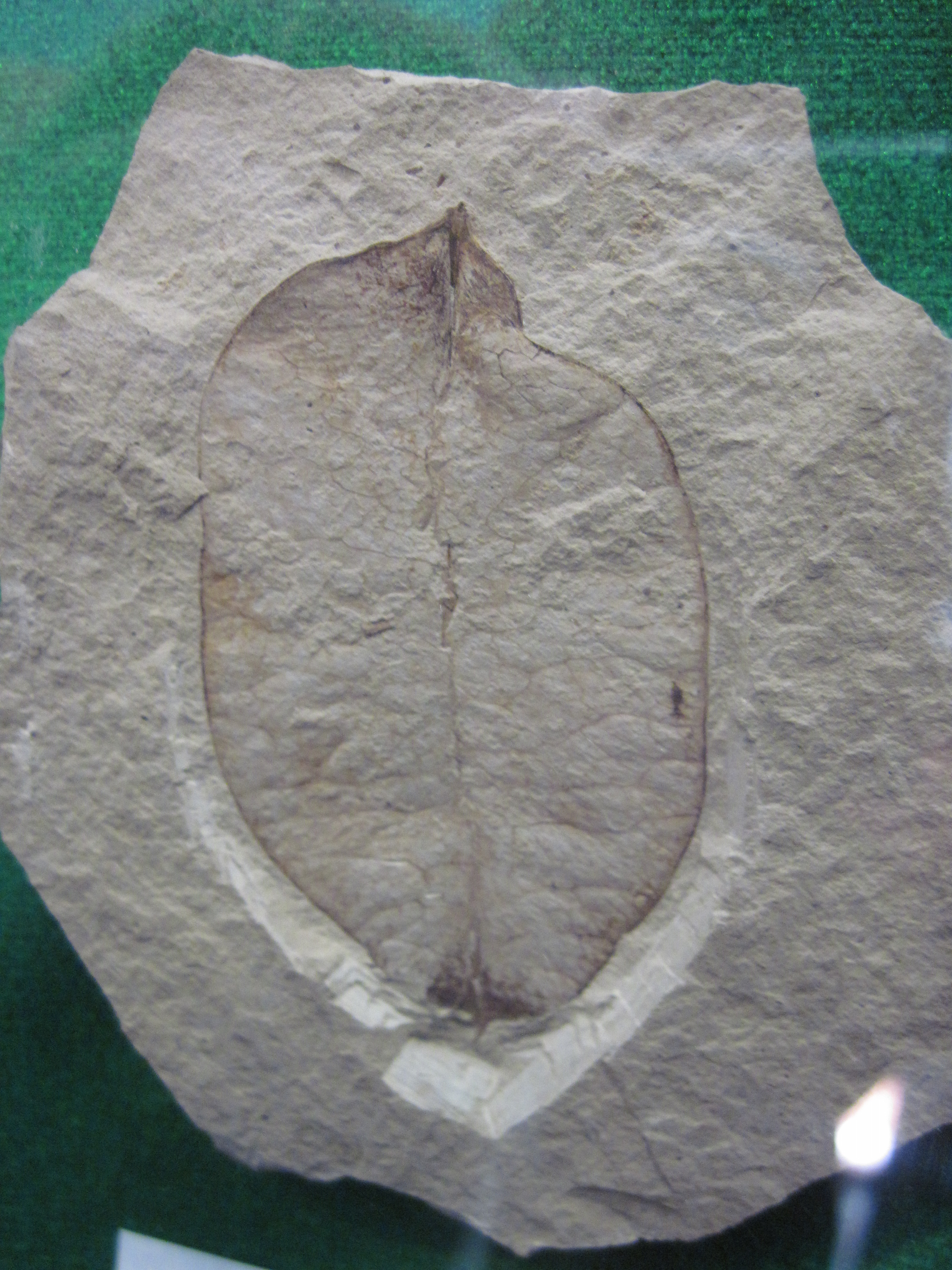

Scientific classification
- Kingdom: Plantae
- Clade: Tracheophytes
- Clade: Angiosperms
- Clade: Eudicots
- Clade: Rosids
- Order: Sapindales
- Family: Sapindaceae
- Genus: Koelreuteria
- Species: †K. dilcheri

Binomial name
- †Koelreuteria dilcheri Wang et al.

Synonyms
- Koelreuteria mixta (Lesq.) R.W. Br., Brown (1946), pro parte

= Koelreuteria dilcheri =

Koelreuteria dilcheri Temporal range: Early Eocene (Ypresian)

Fossil species of golden rain tree

Koelreuteria dilcheri is an extinct golden rain tree species from the Eocene found in the western coastal region of the United States. Fruit fossils of the species have been recovered in Northern California and northeastern Washington. Early fossils were included within several species described based on leaf fossils but have not been found in organic attachment to foliage. The lack of connection lead to the separation of K. dilcheri into a separate morphospecies in 2013. Wind and water dispersal have been suggested as likely modes of seed spreading.

== Distribution ==
The first described fruits, under the name Koelreuteria mixta were identified from the "Chalk bluffs flora" Independence Hill site near Colfax, California, in the northern area of California's Ione Formation. The site has been variously assigned to the early Eocene by Harry MacGinitie, based on attempted correlation to the Ione type strata resulting in a Ypresian age often being reported. However other authors suggest the age may be mistaken, based on anomalously low mean annual temperature estimates compared to other sites purported to be the same age located north and inland of the Chalk Bluffs site, with a possible 37 million years ago age begin suggested by Donald Prothero et al. (2011).

Several additional fruits were reported from the Klondike Mountain Formation exposed at Republic in Ferry County, northeast Central Washington. Tuffs of the Klondike Mountain Formation had been dated to 49.42 ± 0.54 million years ago, the youngest of the Okanagan Highlands sites, though a revised oldest age of 51.2 ± 0.1 million years ago was given based on isotopic data published in 2021.

== History and classification ==
The first fruit like fossils were initially studied and described by paleobotanist Roland W. Brown in 1946 based on an isolated specimen from the Ione Formations Independence Hill site. At the same time, Brown recognized that leaves named by Leo Lesquereux in 1878 as Rhus mixta from the formation were actually Koelreuteria leaflets. Given that the fruit specimen was found in the same strata as the leaflets, Brown included it in an expanded description when officially transferring the species to Koelreuteria as Koelreuteria mixta.

This treatment of leaves and fruits in the same species was retained from 1946 until 2013, when the fossil record of the genus was reevaluated. A team of botanists and paleobotanists led by Qi Wang examined the known and purported fossils of Koelreuteria from the Northern Hemisphere, making a number of taxonomic changes in the process. One change was the recognition that the Californian fruit and leaf fossils had never actually been found in phyllotaxic connection, and as such the fruits and leaves should be separated into two morphospecies. As Leaquereux originally described his species from only leaves, the name Koelreuteria mixta was returned to only including leaf fossils. In addition to the fruit from the Ione Formation, two additional fruits of very similar morphology were reported from the Klondike Mountain Formation in northern Washington state. While showing some variation from the Ione fossil, they were deemed close enough to warrant inclusion as the same species. To accommodate the fruits, a new species was described by the team, with the Ione fossil as holotype and the two Washington fruits as paratypes. The fossils were held in the Smithsonians National Museum of Natural History, as "USNM P42363", and Seattles Burke Museum of Natural History and Culture, as "UWBM PB94575" and "UWBM PB1695/PB1696" respectively. The new species was named "dilcheri" to honor David Dilcher for his important works on Cenozoic paleobotany.

== Description ==
In general the fruits range between elliptically oblong for the Republic fruits to wholly oblong for the Colfax fruit. All the specimens are of isolated, membranous, capsular valve sections with smooth margins and no full fruits are known. Their size ranges between 3.5–5.8 cm (1 3/8–2 5/16 in) long by 2.8–3.6 cm (1 1/8–1 7/16 in) with the Republic fruits larger overall. The fruits have rounded tips and bases with no pedicels present in the fossils. The valves have a centrally placed vertical carpellary suture, which grows robust towards the base and fainter towards the apex. This is an indicator that the three individual chambers of the capsule were not fully divided and connection between the three was present in apical regions of the capsule. On each side of the suture are laterally positioned veins that traverse from suture to valve margin. The veins branch off the suture at angles between 30° and 110° before progressing in a wavey pattern across the valve. Branching from the veins are thinner veins which produce a reticulated pattern polygonal areoles elongated along the horizontal. Of the three identified fossils, no seeds where preserved.

== Paleoecology ==
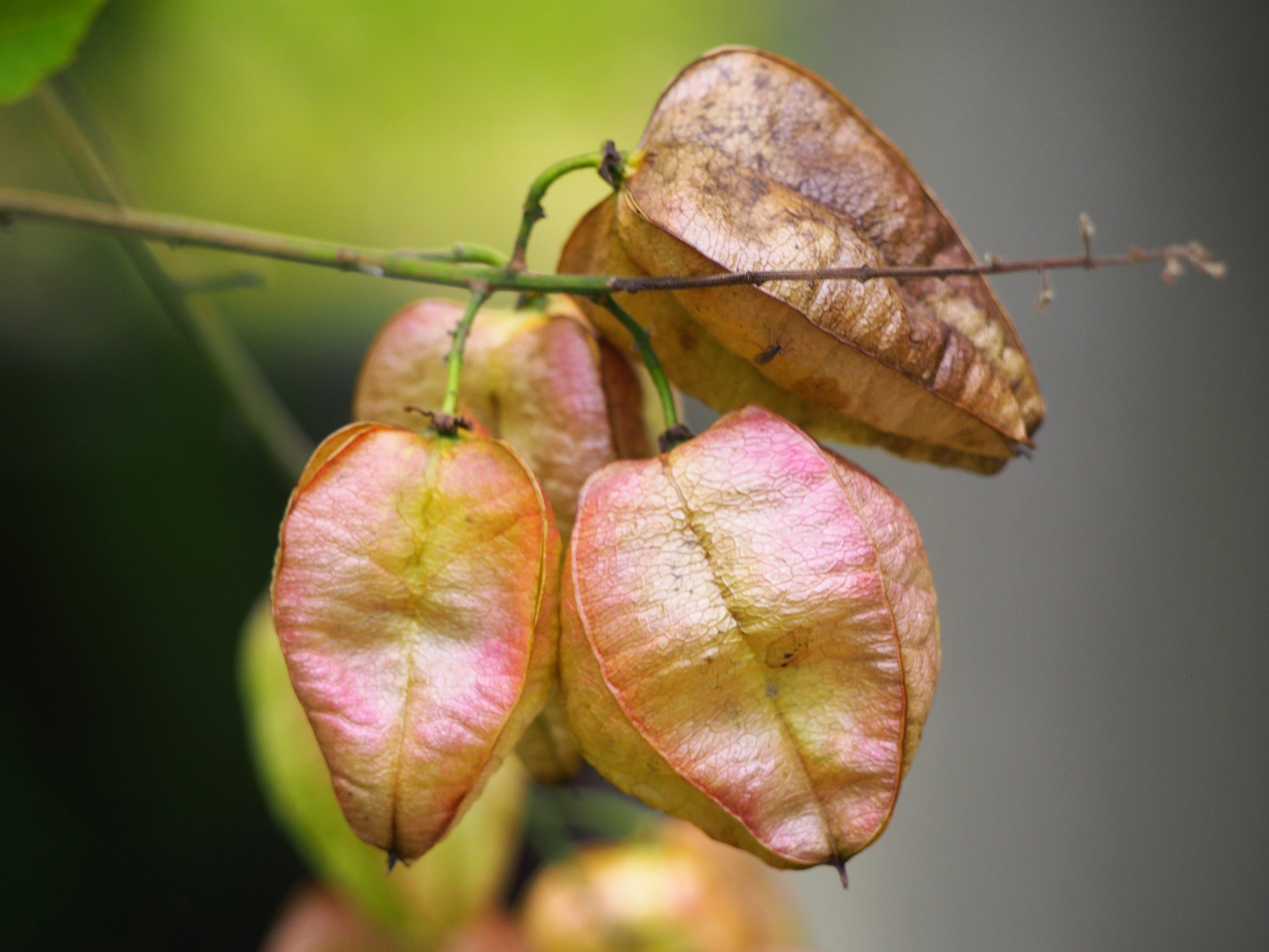
Living Koelreuteria paniculata fruits showing inflation

Koelreuteria dilcheri of the pacific coast and Koelreuteria taoana of China are posited as an example of a North Pacific floral connection during the Eocene. Wang et al in 2013 speculated Koelreuteria may have first emerged in the western regions of North America with the species Koelreuteria allenii of west central North America. That species appears in the Ypresian Green River Formation and persisted until the Priabonian in the Florissant Formation and the John Day Formation in Oregon. The genus was blocked from eastward expansion by the Cannonball Sea, an inland sea crossing parts of central North America in the Paleocene, but spread to the west and north where Wang et al suggest it crossed either the Aleutian land bridge or the Bering land bridge when they were exposed during sea level changes.

The fruits are thought to have behaved in a very similar manner to those of living Koelreuteria. When reaching maturity the fruits inflate into a light balloon-like capsule with the seeds attached to the interior midrib. When detached from the tree, the capsules could be carried on wind currents away from the parent plant before landing. Similarly the capsules could float on water and be transported along rivers and streams. Conversely the fruits themselves may have been like modern species fruits and attracted bird foraging and subsequent dispersal in bird droppings after ingestion.

== Paleoenvironment ==
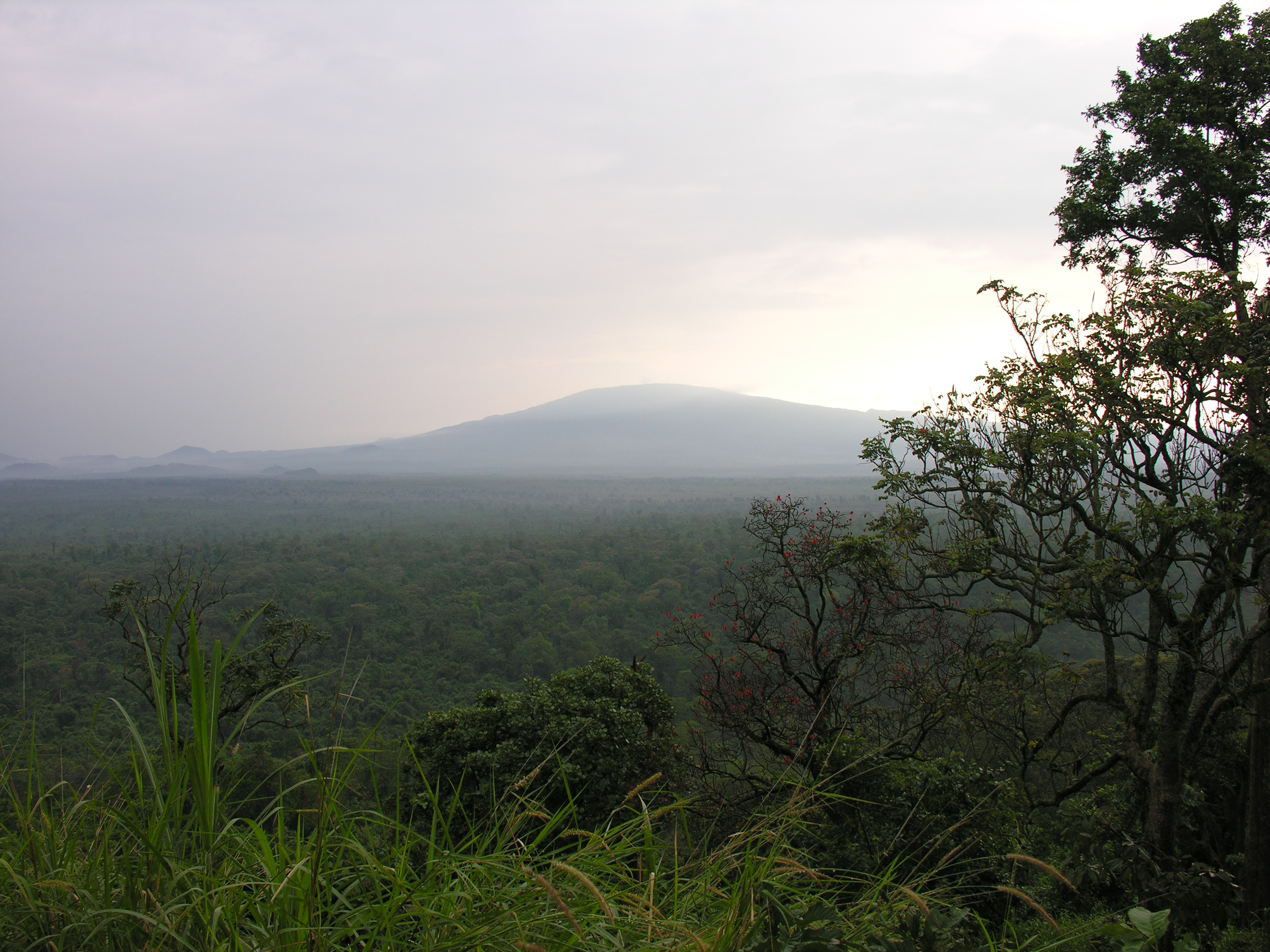
Virunga National Park, Albertine Rift, Africa

The Republic site is part of a larger fossil site system collectively known as the Eocene Okanagan Highlands. The highlands, including the Early Eocene lacustrine formations between Driftwood Canyon at the north and Republic at the south, have been described as one of the "Great Canadian Lagerstätten" based on the diversity, quality and unique nature of the paleofloral and paleofaunal biotas that are preserved. The highlands temperate biome that is preserved across a large transect of lakes records many of the earliest appearances of modern genera, while also documenting the last stands of ancient lines. The warm temperate highland floras in association with downfaulted lacustrine basins and active volcanism are noted to have no exact modern equivalents. This is due to the more seasonally equitable conditions of the Early Eocene, resulting in much lower seasonal temperature shifts. However, the highlands have been compared to the upland ecological islands in the Virunga Mountains within the Albertine Rift of the African rift valley.

The Republic upland lake system was surrounded by a warm temperate ecosystem with nearby volcanism. The highlands likely had a mesic upper microthermal to lower mesothermal climate, in which winter temperatures rarely dropped low enough for snow, and which were seasonably equitable. The paleoforests surrounding the lakes have been described as precursors to the modern temperate broadleaf and mixed forests of Eastern North America and Eastern Asia. Based on the fossil biotas the lakes were higher and cooler than the coeval coastal forests preserved in the Puget Group and Chuckanut Formation of Western Washington, which are described as lowland tropical forest ecosystems. Estimates of the paleoelevation range between 0.7–1.2 km (0.43–0.75 mi) higher than the coastal forests. This is consistent with the paleoelevation estimates for the lake systems, which range between 1.1–2.9 km (1,100–2,900 m), which is similar to the modern elevation 0.8 km (0.50 mi), but higher.

Estimates of the mean annual temperature have been derived from climate leaf analysis multivariate program (CLAMP) and leaf margin analysis (LMA) of the Republic paleoflora. The CLAMP results after multiple linear regressions for Republic gave a mean annual temperature of approximately 8.0 °C (46.4 °F), with the LMA giving 9.2 ± 2.0 °C (48.6 ± 3.6 °F). These are lower than the mean annual temperature estimates given for the coastal Puget Group, which is estimated to have been between 15–18.6 °C (59.0–65.5 °F). The bioclimatic analysis for Republic suggests mean annual precipitation amounts of 115 ± 39 cm (45 ± 15 in).

The Ione formation preserves a braided plain and deltaic ecosystem along the coastal margins of the Eocene Californian coast. The river systems and deltas are deeply eroded into older to coeval Laramide uplift plateau topography. The initial deep river channels were then backfilled as the deltatic conditions were caused by rising ocean levels. The banks and flood plains areas of the infilling delta systems consistently received much more fine sedimentation and preserved most of the paleoflora fossils. Based on the weathering of the preserved paleosols, the climate was notedly humid, with paleotemperatures near tropical.
