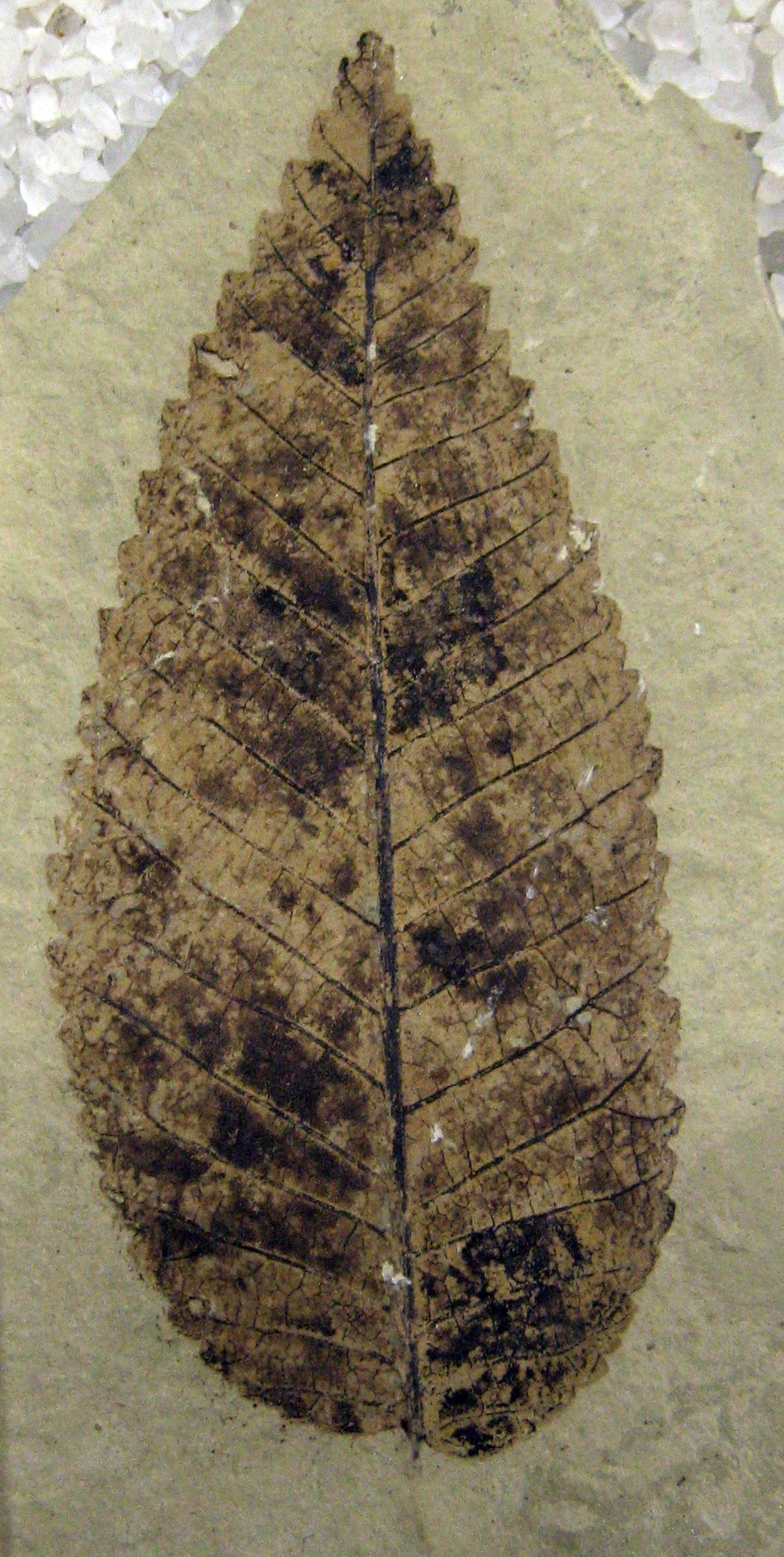
- U. chuchuanus leaf

Scientific classification
- Kingdom: Plantae
- Clade: Tracheophytes
- Clade: Angiosperms
- Clade: Eudicots
- Clade: Rosids
- Order: Rosales
- Family: Ulmaceae
- Genus: Ulmus
- Species: †U. chuchuanus

Binomial name
- †Ulmus chuchuanus (Berry) LaMotte

Synonyms
- Ulmus columbianus Berry (non Penhallow), 1926

= Ulmus chuchuanus =

Ulmus chuchuanus Temporal range: Ypresian

Extinct species of elm

Ulmus chuchuanus is an extinct species of flowering plant in the family Ulmaceae related to the modern elms. The species is known from fossil leaves and fruits found in early Eocene sites of northern Washington state, United States and central British Columbia, Canada.

== Distribution and paleoenvironment ==
Ulmus chuchuanus fossils have been identified from six locations in northwestern North America. The species redescription listed occurrences in the British Columbian Chu Chua Formation at Joseph Creek, the McAbee and Falklands sites of the Traquille Formation around Cache Creek, and in Coldwater Beds at Quilchena. The most northerly of the sites known are the Driftwood Shales northeast of Smithers while the most southerly is of the Klondike Mountain Formation near Republic, Washington.

The sites comprise the Eocene Okanagan Highlands fossil site system. The highlands, including the Eocene formations between Driftwood canyon and Republic, have been described as one of the "Great Canadian Lagerstätten" based on the diversity, quality and unique nature of the paleofloral and paleofaunal biotas that are preserved. The highlands temperate biome preserved across a large transect of lakes recorded many of the earliest appearances of modern genera, while also documenting the last stands of ancient lines. The warm temperate highland floras in association with downfaulted lacustrine basins and active volcanism are noted to have no exact modern equivalents. This is due to the more seasonally equitable conditions of the Early Eocene, resulting in much lower seasonal temperature shifts. However, the highlands have been compared to the upland ecological islands in the Virunga Mountains within the Albertine Rift of the African rift valley.

== History and classification ==
Fossils of Ulmus chuchuanus were first reported and briefly described by Edward W. Berry (1926) from outcrops of the Chu Chua Formation near Josephs Creek in south-central British Columbia. Berry chose the name Ulmus columbianus for the new species, however a variant of that name, Ulmus columbiana, had already been coined by David P. Penhallow (1907) for a species of fossil wood also found in the Okanagan highlands, near Midway, British Columbia. Penhallow cited the wood by the name Ulmus columbiensis in 1908, and it was subsequently moved by Nagelhard (1922) to the Ulmaceae petrified wood form genus Ulminium as Ulminium columbianum. However Berry's name was still a resulting homonym, which wasn't rectified until the current name, Ulmus chuchuanus was coined by Robert LaMotte in 1952 based on the name of Penhallow's original specimens. Robyn Burnham (1986), in her review of the western United States Eocene Ulmaceae fossil record identified a fruit and three distinct leaf morphotypes at Republic. The leaves were placed in her "Chaetaptelea Leaf Morphotype A", "Ulmus Leaf Morphotype A", and "Zelkova Leaf Morphotype C", while Burnham considered the fruits identical to modern Chaetoptelea fruits. The next year Jack Wolfe and Wesley Wehr published their monograph on the Republic flora dicots, in which they listed "Ulmus species and "new genus aff. Zelkova" in the taxonomic synopsis, but did not detail either in the systematic descriptions.

The species was redescribed by Thomas Denk and Richard Dillhoff (2005) who listed Burnham's Republic "Chaetaptelea Leaf Morphotype A", "Chaetaptelea Leaf Morphotype B" and "Ulmus Leaf Morphotype A" as specimens of U. chuchuanus as well as Wolfe and Wehrs "Ulmus species" as belonging to the species. Denk and Dillhoff detailed the mosaic features of the leaves and associated fruits, noting the foliar features are most similar to Ulmus subgenus Ulmus, while the fruits show affinity to Ulmus subgenus Oreoptelea.

== Description ==
The leaves range up to 190 mm (7.5 in) in length and have a maximum width of 110 mm (4.3 in), though the average leaf size is between 50–90 mm (2.0–3.5 in) by 30–50 mm (1.2–2.0 in). The 3–6 mm (0.12–0.24 in) long petiole is bracketed by uneven lobes of the leaf base, with one lobe typically being larger than the other. The leaves are pinnately veined, averaging ten to sixteen secondary veins branching from the primary vein. In the larger leaves there are between five and thirteen secondaries, while in small leaves, the count ranges between fourteen and twenty-two. The secondaries branch from the primary at an increasing angle basally and each secondary has between one and four abmedial veins branching off the basal side. Both the secondary veins and their exterior forks terminate in teeth along the leaf margins. Tertiary veins run perpendicular between secondaries, with straight central sections which grade into sinuous sections close to the secondaries.

The leaves have compound teeth, each of the large teeth on having one to three smaller teeth located basally between it and the next large tooth. The primary teeth often have convex basal sides that lead up to and terminate at sharp tooth tips, though occasional teeth have straight or concave sides. The apical sides of the primary teeth are concave to "s" shaped with the overall orientation of the tooth pointing apically. The secondary veins which supply each tooth curve upwards into the tooth before terminating at the tooth apex. The secondary teeth are typically similar to the primary teeth, though with an orientation towards the leaf base. The sinus between each tooth set is supplied with a pair of tertiary veins that fork from two adjacent secondary or abmedial veins and converge in the sinus.
