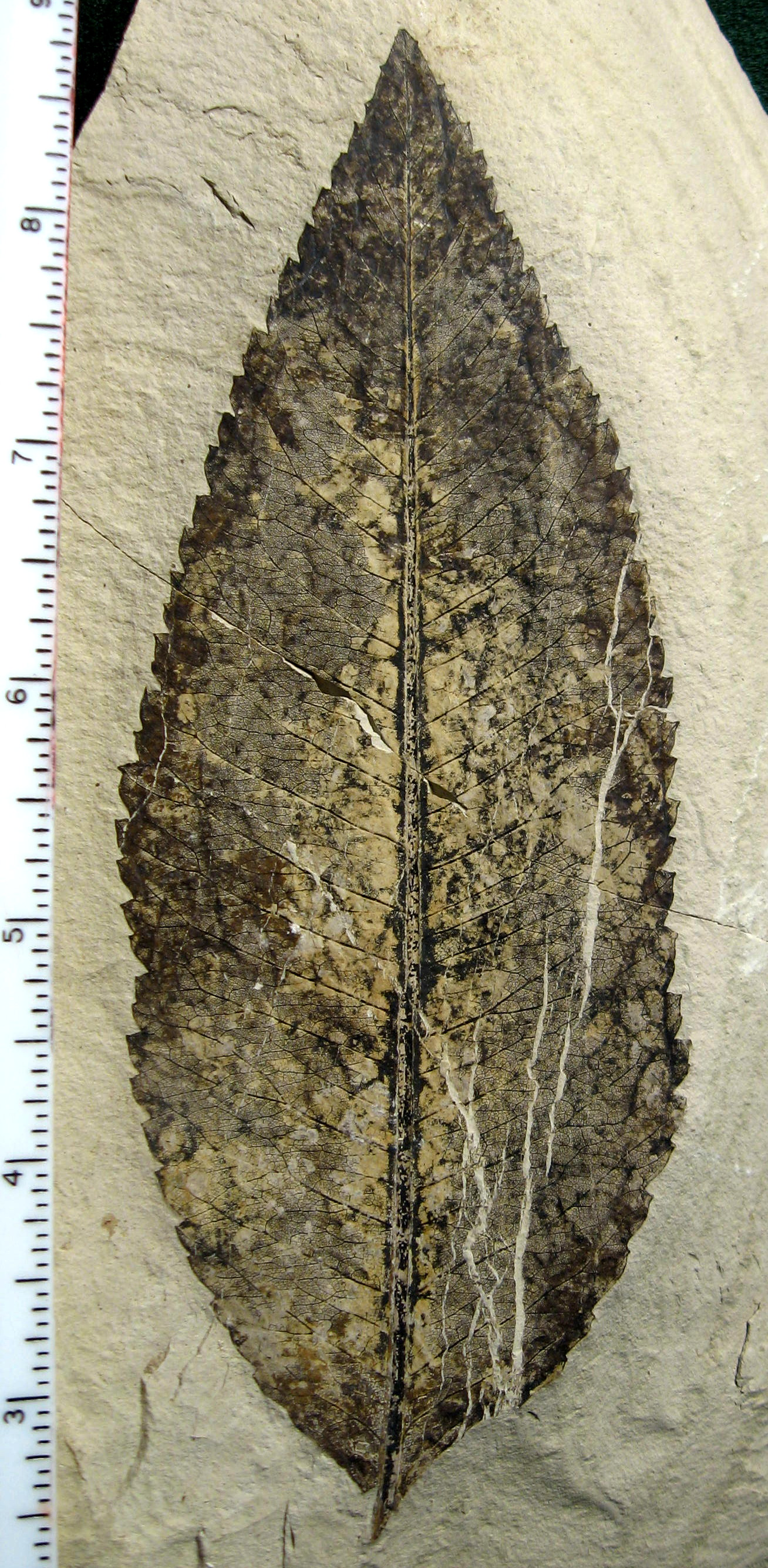
- Large leaf

Scientific classification
- Kingdom: Plantae
- Clade: Tracheophytes
- Clade: Angiosperms
- Clade: Eudicots
- Clade: Rosids
- Order: Rosales
- Family: Rosaceae
- Genus: Photinia
- Species: †P. pageae

Binomial name
- †Photinia pageae Wolfe & Wehr

= Photinia pageae =

Photinia pageae Temporal range: Early Eocene (Ypresian)

Extinct species in the family Rosaceae

Photinia pageae is an extinct species of flowering plant in the family Rosaceae related to the modern Photinias. The species is known from fossil leaves found in early Eocene sites of northern Washington state, United States, and central British Columbia, Canada.

== Distribution ==
Photinia pageae fossils have been found at three sites belonging to the Eocene Okanagan Highlands of Washington and British Columbia. The species and one undescribed species are known from fossils of the Klondike Mountain Formation exposed at Republic in Ferry County, northeast Central Washington. Tuffs of the Klondike Mountain Formation had been dated to 49.42 ± 0.54 million years ago, the youngest of the Okanagan Highlands sites, though a revised oldest age of 51.2 ± 0.1 million years ago was given based on isotopic data published in 2021.

The species has been reported by Robin Smith et al. (2012) as occurring in the Tranquille Formation's Falkland flora west of Cache Creek in central British Columbia and the Horsefly Shales near Horsefly north central British Columbia. The lake sediments at the related McAbee fossil site near Falkland were first radiometrically dated using the K-Ar method in the 1960s based on ash samples exposed in the lake bed. These samples yielded an age of ~51 million years ago; however, dating published in 2005 provided a ^{40}Ar-^{39}Ar radiometric date placing the McAbee site at 52.9 ± 0.83 million years ago. The horsefly shales have not been radiometrically dated, but based on shared floral and faunal taxa found in other Early Eocene, Ypresian, age Okanagan Highlands sites, Horsefly is assumed to be contemporaneous. In addition to the described and unnamed Photinia species of the Klondike Mountain Formation, David Greenwood et al. (2005) also reported the genus from sites of the Allenby Formation around Princeton in southern central British Columbia, but did not indicate if the leaves were likely P. pageae or a new species.

== History and classification ==
Photinia pageae was described from two type specimen leaves, the holotype UW39188 and the paratype UW39195, in the paleobotanical collections of the University of Washingtons Burke Museum, plus the second paratype UCMP 9292 housed in the University of California Museum of Paleontology. Working from these specimens, all collected in Republic, Washington in the early 1980s, the fossils were studied by Jack A. Wolfe, then of the University of California, and Wesley Wehr, Northwest School artist and affiliate paleobotany curator of the Burke Museum. They published their 1987 type description for the species in a United States Geological Survey monograph on the North Eastern Washington dicot fossils. The species name pageae is a matronym recognizing Virginia Page for her contributions to wood anatomy and Cretaceous to Tertiary xylotomy.

Based on the thickness of the leaf and secondary venation, Wolfe and Wehr placed their new species to be affiliated with the "Rosidae" clade. The distinct highly angled tertiary venation forms a randomized reticulum between the secondaries and primary vein. This, combined with the larger upcurved teeth on the margin, resulted in Wolfe and Wehr placing the species into Photinia as circumscribed excluding Heteromeles species. While reviewing the fossil record of Rosaceae, Melanie DeVore and Kathleen Pigg (2007) noted that a possible undescribed second species of Photinia was also present at Republic, per Wesley Wehr, but no other detail was given.

Images of three P. pageae specimens were included in a database of cleared or x-rayed preserved modern leaves, plus fossil leaves from selected sites. The database, spearheaded by Peter Wilf of Pennsylvania State University, was compiled as a resource for training both humans and artificial intelligence machine learning. The goal was to present a curated selection of leaves with confirmed family placement that allows for comparison and building image-association–based learning.

== Description ==
The leaves of Photinia pageae are simple with a pinnate venation and distinct petiole. They are symmetrical and narrow with an elliptical to ovate outline. Both the leaf apex and base are tapered to points, with the base extending down along the sides of the petiole slightly. The margins have regularly spaced teeth of varying size generally placed two teeth between each secondary vein. While the teeth are notably varied in size they do not form compound teeth, but are all simple teeth. The basal sides of the teeth are slightly convex in outline coming to a pointed to rounded tip. The apical marginal side of the teeth proceed towards the leaf center at anything from a basal to apical slant until they reach a narrow sinus and curve upwards into the next tooth.

There is a single central primary vein extending from the petiole upwards to the leaf tip, with a number of secondary veins branching off on either side. The secondary veins fork from the primary at approximately 70° angles and run a straight to slightly zigzaged course towards the margins before curving upwards near the margin and fusing into the next secondary tipward. The secondaries run parallel to subparallel courses resulting in variable intersecondary spaces. Small branches of the secondaries fork from the external sides of the apical loop to run into the marginal teeth and terminate. Intersecondary veins, veins branching from the primary vein with about the same size as a secondary, are numerous and distinct. The intersecondaries run parallel to subparallel to the surrounding secondaries before apically branching into smaller veins and disappearing. The tertiary veins from a randomized reticulated vein pattern between the secondaries and intersecondaries from which they branch off at acute angles. The quaternary veins also form a finer reticulated veination present between the larger series of veins, while the quinternary follow suit and form areolae.

== Paleoecology ==
The modern range of Photinia species is in the tropics to subtropics of eastern Asia and Central America where they are mostly found in notophyllous broadleaf forests. Within the modern range, species are mostly found in temperate mesothermal climates, though some species do cross over into the cooler continental microthermal climate zones. Wolfe and Wehr suggested the species was an evergreen small tree to large shrub broadleaf and considered likely a minor element of the conifer forested hills.

== Paleoenvironment ==
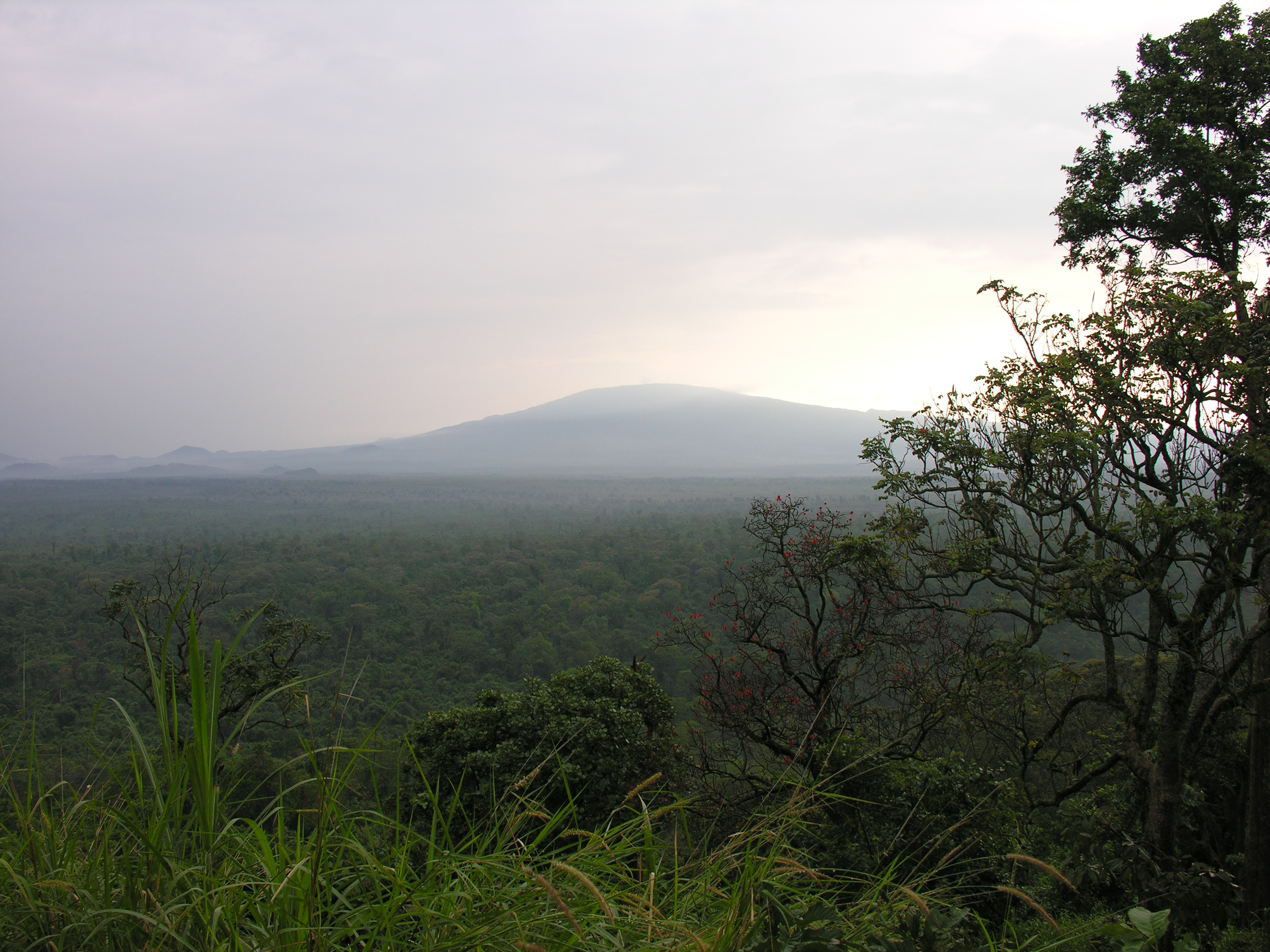
Virunga National Park, Albertine Rift, Democratic Republic of the Congo

The Republic, Falkland and Horsefly sites are part of a larger fossil site system collectively known as the Eocene Okanagan Highlands. The highlands, including the Early Eocene formations between Driftwood Canyon at the north and Republic at the south, have been described as one of the "Great Canadian Lagerstätten" based on the diversity, quality and unique nature of the paleofloral and paleofaunal biotas that are preserved. The highlands temperate biome preserved across a large transect of lakes recorded many of the earliest appearances of modern genera, while also documenting the last stands of ancient lines. The warm temperate highland floras in association with downfaulted lacustrine basins and active volcanism are noted to have no exact modern equivalents. This is due to the more seasonally equitable conditions of the Early Eocene, resulting in much lower seasonal temperature shifts. However, the highlands have been compared to the upland ecological islands of the Virunga Mountains within the African rift valleys Albertine Rift.

The Klondike Mountain Formation represents pinpoint spot a long upland lake system series that was surrounded by a warm temperate ecosystem with nearby volcanism dating from during and just after the early Eocene climatic optimum. The Okanagan Highlands likely had a mesic upper microthermal to lower mesothermal climate, in which winter temperatures rarely dropped low enough for snow, and which were seasonably equitable. The paleoforest surrounding the lakes have been described as precursors to the modern temperate broadleaf and mixed forests of Eastern North America and Eastern Asia. Based on the fossil biotas the lakes were higher and cooler then the coeval coastal forests preserved in the Puget Group and Chuckanut Formation of Western Washington, which are described as lowland tropical forest ecosystems. Estimates of the paleoelevation range between 0.7 and 1.2 km (0.43 and 0.75 mi) higher than the coastal forests. This is consistent with the paleoelevation estimates for the lake systems, which range between 1.1 and 2.9 km (1,100 and 2,900 m), which is similar to the modern elevation 0.8 km (0.50 mi), but higher.

Estimates of the mean annual temperature have been derived from climate leaf analysis multivariate program (CLAMP) analysis of the Republic paleoflora, and leaf margin analysis (LMA) of Republic and Falkland paleofloras. The CLAMP results after multiple linear regressions for Republic gave a mean annual temperature of approximately 8.0 °C (46.4 °F), with the LMA giving 9.2 ± 2.0 °C (48.6 ± 3.6 °F). LMA results from Falkland returned the higher 10.0 ± 2.2 °C (50.0 ± 4.0 °F), slightly higher than seen at Republic, and CLAMP analysis gave an overall mean annual temperature of 12.8 ± 1.2 °C (55.0 ± 2.2 °F). A bioclimatic-based estimate based on modern relatives of the taxa found at each site suggested mean annual temperatures around 13.5 ± 2.2 °C (56.3 ± 4.0 °F) for Republic and 14.7 ± 2.1 °C (58.5 ± 3.8 °F) for Falkland. These are lower than the mean annual temperature estimates given for the coastal Puget Group, which is estimated to have been between 15–18.6 °C (59.0–65.5 °F). The bioclimatic analysis for Republic and Falkland suggest mean annual precipitation amounts of 115 ± 39 cm (45 ± 15 in) and 105 ± 48 cm (41 ± 19 in) respectively.
