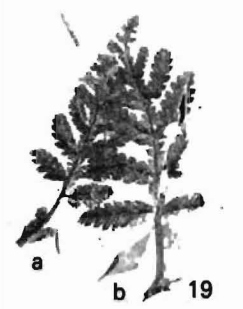
- Stonebergia columbiana holotype Burke Museum #54110A

Scientific classification
- Kingdom: Plantae
- Clade: Tracheophytes
- Clade: Angiosperms
- Clade: Eudicots
- Clade: Rosids
- Order: Rosales
- Family: Rosaceae
- Subfamily: Amygdaloideae
- Tribe: Sorbarieae
- Genus: †Stonebergia; Wolfe & Wehr
- Species: †S. columbiana

Binomial name
- †Stonebergia columbiana Wolfe & Wehr

= Stonebergia =

Stonebergia Temporal range: Early Eocene

Extinct genus of flowering plants

Stonebergia is an extinct genus in the rose family, Rosaceae, which contains the single species Stonebergia columbiana. The genus was described from a series of isolated fossil leaves in shale from an early Eocene location in southern British Columbia.

== History and classification ==
Stonebergia has only been identified from one location in the Eocene Okanagan Highlands, the type locality "One mile Creek" exposure of the Allenby Formation near Princeton, British Columbia. The Allenby Formation is currently considered to be Early Eocene in age, based on potassium–argon radiometric dating of plagioclase and biotite crystals. The Allenby formation sediments are interpreted as preserved river lake and wetlands systems, with a surrounding mountain environment.

The species was described from a type specimen, the holotype specimen UWBM 54110 A, B and group of eight paratypes, five of which are currently preserved in the paleobotanical collections housed at the Burke Museum of Natural History and Culture, in Seattle, Washington. Another one of the paratypes is placed in the princetone Museum and District Archives and the remaining two paratypes are in the University of Alberta collections. The specimens were studied by the paleobotanists Jack A. Wolfe of the United States Geological Survey, Denver office and Wesley C. Wehr of the Burke Museum. They published their 1988 type description for S. columbiana in the Journal Aliso. In their type description they note the etymology for the generic name Stonebergia is in honor of Margaret Stoneberg from the Princeton District Museum for her support and encouragement of Wolfe and Wehr. The specific epithet columbiana, is a reference to the type locality in British Columbia.

== Description ==
The leaves of Stonebergia are simple and pinnately veined ranging between 1.7–2.2 centimetres (0.67–0.87 in) long and 1.0–3.0 centimetres (0.39–1.18 in) wide. The leaf lamina is notably pinnatifid with some areas almost being a compound leaf structure. The leaves have between four and nine pairs of secondary veins branching from the main vein at angles up to 90° near the base and decreasing to around 45° near the leaf tip. Each side of the secondary veins host up to seven lobes of the lamina and each lobe has up to eight total teeth. The petiole ranges between 0.8–1.0 centimetre (0.31–0.39 in) long and is notably very hairy. It bears a stipule up to half the petiole length which hosts many simple straight hairs in addition to some glandular hairs.
