= Acer spitzi =

Acer spitzi Temporal range: Ypresian

Scientific classification
- Kingdom: Plantae
- Clade: Tracheophytes
- Clade: Angiosperms
- Clade: Eudicots
- Clade: Rosids
- Order: Sapindales
- Family: Sapindaceae
- Genus: Acer
- Section: †Acer sect. Spitza
- Species: †A. spitzi

Binomial name
- †Acer spitzi Wolfe & Tanai, 1987

Extinct species of maple

Acer spitzi is an extinct maple species in the family Sapindaceae described from a single fossil samara. The species is solely known from the Early Eocene sediments exposed in northeast Washington state, United States. It is the only species belonging to the extinct section Spitza.

== History and classification ==
The species was described from a solitary part and counterpart type specimen, the holotype samara, number UWBM 31272 which is currently preserved in the paleobotanical collections of the University of Washingtons Burke Museum. The specimen, recovered from the A0307 site in Republic, was studied by paleobotanists Jack A. Wolfe then of the United States Geological Survey, Denver office and Toshimasa Tanai of Hokkaido University. Wolfe and Tanai (1987) published their type description for A. spitzi in the Journal of the Faculty of Science, Hokkaido University. The etymology of the chosen specific name spitzi is a patronym in recognition of Mark Spitz who collected abundant Acer specimens from the Republic flora for study. As the only species in the section Spitza, the section name is a derivation of spitzi.

The monotypic section Spitza, containing only A. spitzi, was suggested by Wolfe and Tanai (1987) to possibly be a basal relative of Acer sect. Acer and Acer sect. Integrifolia. They based the placement on a number of shared characters between species of those sections and A. spitzi, including the distinct sulcus, the highly inflated nutlet, and the thickening of the wing base. However, since the prominent proximal keel, seen in members of both sections is missing from A. spitzi, and the nutlet is lacking pubescence, it was placed into the new separate section Acer sect. Spitza.

== Distribution and paleoecology ==
Acer spitzi is known from a single specimen which was recovered from a single location in the Eocene Okanagan Highlands, an outcrop of the Ypresian Klondike Mountain Formation in Republic. The formation preserves an upland lake system surrounded by a mixed conifer–broadleaf forest with nearby volcanism. The pollen flora has notable elements of birch and golden larch, and distinct trace amounts of fir, spruce, cypress, and palm. Wolfe and Tanai (1987) interpreted the forest climate to have been microthermal, having distinct seasonal temperature swings which dipped below freezing in the winters. However further study has shown the lake system was surrounded by a warm temperate ecosystem that likely had a mesic upper microthermal to lower mesothermal climate, in which winter temperatures rarely dropped low enough for snow, and which were seasonably equitable. The Okanagan highlands paleoforest surrounding the lakes have been described as precursors to the modern temperate broadleaf and mixed forests of Eastern North America and Eastern Asia. Based on the fossil biotas the lakes were higher and cooler than the coeval coastal forests preserved in the Puget Group and Chuckanut Formation of Western Washington, which are described as lowland tropical forest ecosystems. Estimates of the paleoelevation range between 700–1,200 m (2,300–3,900 ft) higher than the coastal forests. This is consistent with the paleoelevation estimates for the lake systems, which range between 1,100–2,900 m (3,600–9,500 ft), which is similar to the modern elevation of 800 m (2,600 ft), but higher.

Estimates of the mean annual temperature for the Klondike Mountain Formation have been derived from climate leaf analysis multivariate program (CLAMP) analysis and leaf margin analysis (LMA) of the Republic paleoflora. The CLAMP results after multiple linear regressions for Republic gave a mean annual temperature of approximately 8.0 °C (46.4 °F), while the LMA gave 9.2 ± 2.0 °C (48.6 ± 3.6 °F). This is lower than the mean annual temperature estimates given for the coastal Puget Group, which is estimated to have been between 15–18.6 °C (59.0–65.5 °F). The bioclimatic analysis for Republic suggests mean annual precipitation amounts of 115 ± 39 cm (45 ± 15 in).

A. spitzi is one of a number of Acer species described from the Republic site by Wolfe and Tanai. Like the associated maple species A. hillsi, A. republicense, A. stonebergae and A. toradense, A. spitzi is only known from a samara fossil. This contrasts the species A. washingtonense and A. wehri which are known from fossil samaras and leaves.

== Description ==
A. spitzi fruits are samaras which were born in pairs connected at the fruit base by a broad attachment plane forming a 40° attachment angle. The attachment scar on the holotype is approximately 4–6 mm (0.16–0.24 in) and at least 2 mm (0.079 in) deep, extending into the rock matrix. The 7–8 mm (0.28–0.31 in) by 5 mm (0.20 in) wide nutlet is broadly oval in outline with a slightly wider wing end and is notably inflated. It is positioned at about a 30° to the attachment scar with the wing placed fully apical to the nutlet without the formation of a sulcus. A group of up to eight faint veins parallel each other over the apical half of the nutlet flanked by a pair of raised flanges which run the apical 1/3 of the nutlet. The nutlet veins do not fuse together along the upper wing margin, but run directly into the wing blade. The overall length of the samara is approximately 18–22 millimetres (0.71–0.87 in) with a wing width of 10 millimetres (0.39 in) in the broadest area. The outline of the wing is straight on the upper margin for 2/3 of the wing length changing to a broadly rounded wing apex for the last 1/3 of the length. The lower margin is broadly convex reaching its widest in the apical 1/3 of the wing. The wing base is thickened with venation formed by six veins that merge along the upper margin of the wing before splitting and curving downwards into the wing with angles between 10° and 30°. Each of the wing veins have an irregular path occasionally dichotomizing, and often anastomosing, with the formation of reticulate venation occurring.
