= Acer republicense =

Acer republicense Temporal range: Ypresian

Scientific classification
- Kingdom: Plantae
- Clade: Tracheophytes
- Clade: Angiosperms
- Clade: Eudicots
- Clade: Rosids
- Order: Sapindales
- Family: Sapindaceae
- Genus: Acer
- Section: †Acer sect. Republica
- Species: †A. republicense

Binomial name
- †Acer republicense Wolfe & Tanai, 1987

Extinct species of maple

Acer republicense is an extinct maple species in the family Sapindaceae described from a single fossil samara. The species is solely known from the Early Eocene sediments exposed in northeast Washington state, United States. It is the only species belonging to the extinct section Republica.

== Taxonomy ==
Acer republicense is known from a single specimen which was recovered from an outcrop of the early Eocene, Ypresian Klondike Mountain Formation in Republic. The section Republica contains only the species A. republicense. The Klondike Mountain Formation preserves an upland temperate flora which was first interpreted as being microthermal, however further study has shown the flora to be more mesothermal in nature. The plant community preserved in the Klondike Mountain formation is a mixed conifer–broadleaf forest with large pollen elements of birch and golden larch, but also having notable traces of fir, spruce, cypress, and palm. A. republicense is one of a number of Acer species described from the Republic site by Wolfe and Tanai. Like the associated species such as A. hillsi, A. spitzi, A. stonebergae and A. toradense, Acer republicense is only known from the samara fossils. This contrasts the species A. washingtonense and A. wehri which are known from both fossil samaras and leaves.

The species was described from a solitary part and counterpart type specimen, the holotype samara, number UAPC S5414A, B, which is currently preserved in the paleobotanical collections of the University of Alberta in Edmonton, Alberta. The specimen was studied by paleobotanists Jack A. Wolfe of the United States Geological Survey, Denver office and Toshimasa Tanai of Hokkaido University. Wolfe and Tanai published their 1987 type description for A. republicense in the Journal of the Faculty of Science, Hokkaido University. The etymology of the chosen specific name republicense is in recognition of the type locality in Republic, Washington, and as the only species in the section Republica, the section name is a derivation of republicense.

== Description ==
The general shape of the A. republicense nutlet is elliptic with a pair of raised flanges which run the length of the slightly inflated nutlet forming a medial ridge. The overall length of the samara is approximately 2.4 centimetres (0.94 in) and a wing width of 0.7 centimetres (0.28 in). The paired samaras of the species have a 50° attachment angle. The wing venation is formed by five veins that merge along the upper margin of the wing before acutely dichotomizing and anastomosing in the wing membrane. This vein structure is more complex then that of other Klondike Mountain formation species, which are related to the modern A. spicatum. The overall structure of A. republicense is indicative of a possible relationship to the Acer sect. Macrantha species.
