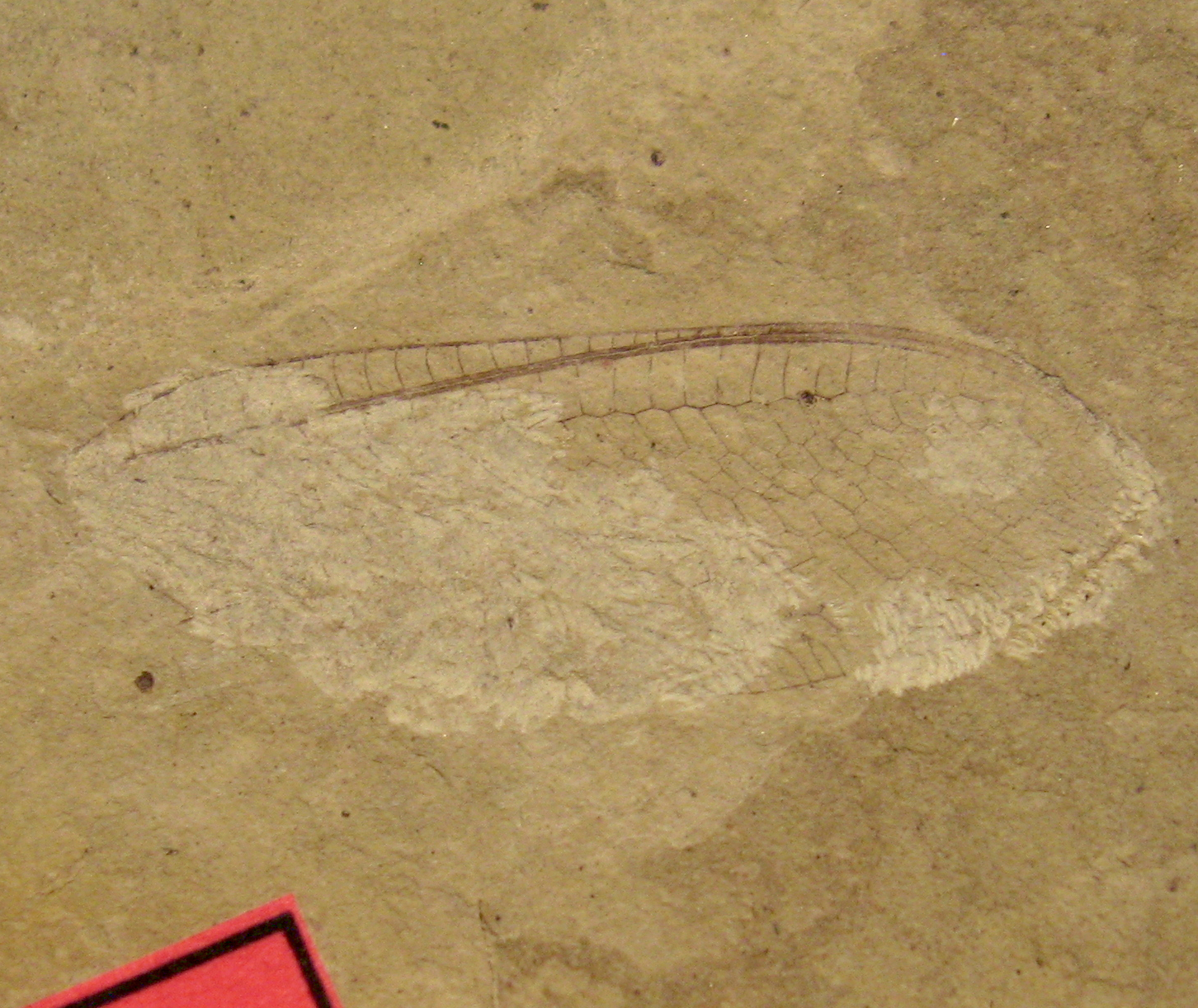
- A. wilsoni holotype wing

Scientific classification
- Kingdom: Animalia
- Phylum: Arthropoda
- Clade: Pancrustacea
- Class: Insecta
- Order: Neuroptera
- Family: Chrysopidae
- Subfamily: Nothochrysinae
- Genus: †Adamsochrysa; Makarkin & Archibald, 2013

Species
- A. aspera; A. wilsoni; and see text

= Adamsochrysa =

Adamsochrysa Temporal range: Ypresian 51.0–49.8 Ma

Family of insects

Adamsochrysa is an extinct neuropteran genus in the green lacewing family Chrysopidae which is solely known from Eocene sediments exposed in northwestern North America. The genus contains two described species, the type species Adamsochrysa aspera along with Adamsochrysa wilsoni. An additional three specimens have been provisionally placed into the genus as Adamsochrysa Sp. A, Adamsochrysa Sp. B, and Adamsochrysa indet. The genus is placed into the green lacewing subfamily Nothochrysinae and considered as probably closest in relation to the living Australian and Tasmanian genus Dictyochrysa.

== Distribution ==
McAbee and Republic

Adamsochrysa fossils have been found at three sites belonging to the Eocene Okanagan Highlands of Washington and British Columbia. Of the two described species and several unnamed specimens, Adamsochrysa aspera and one tentative Adamsochrysa specimen are from the Tranquille Formation's McAbee Fossil Beds west of Cache Creek in central British Columbia. The lake sediments at McAbee were first radiometrically dated using the K-Ar method in the 1960s based on ash samples exposed in the lake bed. These samples yielded an age of ~51 million years ago; however, dating published in 2005 provided a ^{40}Ar-^{39}Ar radiometric date placing the McAbee site at 52.9 ± 0.83 million years ago.

The second named species and one unnamed specimen are known exclusively from fossils of the Klondike Mountain Formation exposed at Republic in Ferry County, northeast Central Washington. The named species, Adamsochrysa wilsoni is known only from the "Boot Hill" site UWBM B4131, while Adamsochrysa Sp. A is only known from the "Corner lot" site A0307. Tuffs of the Klondike Mountain Formation had been dated to 49.42 ± 0.54 million years ago, the youngest of the Okanagan Highlands sites, though a revised oldest age of 51.2 ± 0.1 million years ago was given based on isotopic data published in 2021. A final unnamed specimen, deemed Adamsochrysa Sp. B was recovered from the upper layers of Driftwood Shales in Driftwood Canyon Provincial Park, near Smithers, British Columbia. The same 2005 dating paper established the shales at Driftwood, which had not been formally described, as dating to around 51 million years ago in accordance with the other sites of the highlands, a date supported by the presence of the hedgehog-relative Silvacola from the same site.

== History and classification ==
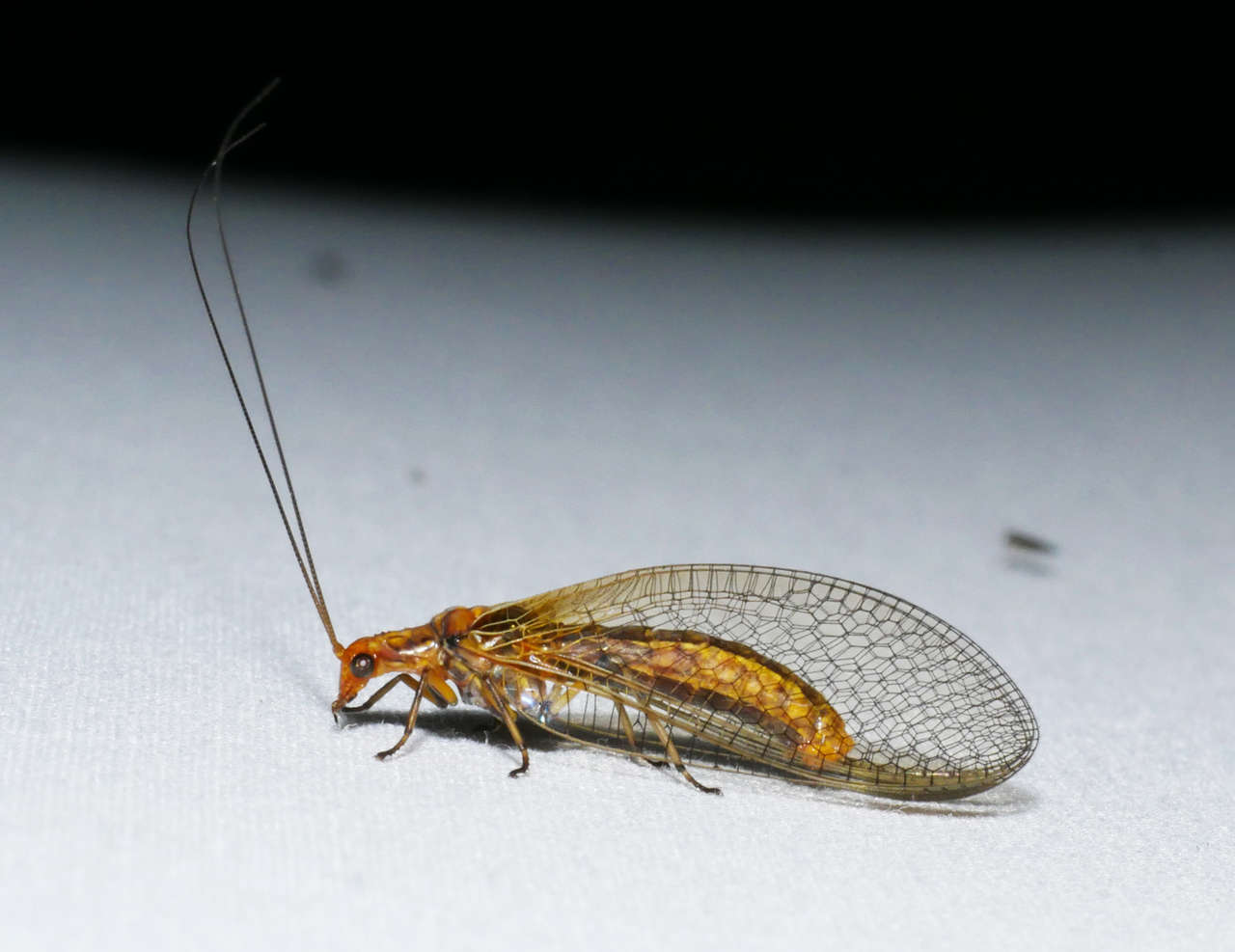
Dictyochrysa fulva from Victoria, Australia

Green lacewings are the second most common neuropterid lacewing family, with only antlions and kin being more diverse. The first report of Chrysopidae from the Okanagan highlands was in a 1995 article by Wesley Wehr and Lisa Barksdale where they noted the family to be present in the Klondike Mountain Formation. The next mention was by Bruce Archibald and Vladimir Makarkin in 2006, where they described the highlands Giant Lacewings, with a brief note on the recovery of the Fur Formation genus Protochrysa in the Okanagan Highlands. However neither of the mentions went into detailed taxonomic assessment and the group was left alone for several more years. In 2013 Makarkin and Archibald released a study of over 20 Chrysopid fossils from the highlands, with the description of six new species in 5 named genera, three of which were new as well.

Adamsochrysa was identified from the type species and an additional species plus several other species all preserved as compression fossils. The name of the genus was created as a combination of the traditional chrysopid genus ending chrysa, along with the surname "Adams". They noted the name was in honor of noted American neuropterologist Phillip Anthony (1929–1998). The type species Adamsochrysa aspera was described based on a holotype, number "CMNIF25", which along with one paratype was housed in the Canadian National Museum of Natural Sciences collections at Ottawa, Canada. The five other identified paratypes were all accessioned into the paleontology collections of Thompson Rivers University in Kelowna, British Columbia. The species has a species name derived from "asper", a Latin adjective meaning "difficult or hard", in reference to the difficulty at times in obtaining the lacewing specimens. The second named species, Adamsochrysa wilsoni, was described from a single type specimen holotype, number "SR 06-23-01", which was preserved in the Stonerose Interpretive Center paleoentomological collection. Makarkin and Archibald state the species was given a patronymic specific name which recognized the finder of the holotype, Gregg Wilson. Additionally the authors identified two specimens that were not well enough preserved to confidently ascribed to an Adamsochrysa species or name as new species, they were instead detailed as Adamsochrysa species A and Adamsochrysa species B.

Makarkin and Archibald (2013) placed the new genus into the lacewing family Chrysopidaes subfamily Nothochrysinae. The placement was based on a series of characters in the forewings. The Psm vein consists of a slightly modified series of crossveins running from a basal area to the middle region of the wing where a break happens, while in the subfamilies Apochrysinae and Chrysopinae the Psm continues uninterrupted to the apical area. The location of the 2m-cu crossvein as either to the basal side of the im cell or merging along the basal section of the cell is found in nothochrysines but not the extinct subfamily Limaiinae where the merge happens consistently along the apical region of the cell. Given the overall vein structure of the wings, it was suggested that the closest relative to Adamsochrysa is the living genus Dictyochrysa which lives only in Australia and Tasmania now.

== Description ==
In general the wings of nothochrysine lacewings have a Psm formed from the altered upper gradate series of crossveins that does not extend to the apical region continually. The wings are lacking a tympanal organ, which is found in the modern subfamilies Apochrysinae and Chrysopinae. The forewing has a basal jugal lobe, which is only seen well developed in nothochrysine and Limaiime chrysopids, while they are either absent or reduced in Apochrysinae and Chrysopinae. The forewings have the "2m-cu" crossvein merging along the basal section of the "im cell", while it is absent in Apochrysinae, and merges in the apical region of the cell in Limaiinae. A frenulum is located along the basal fore edge of the hind wings, a feature missing or smaller in Apochrysinae and Chrysopinae.

In Adamsochrysa the overall wing venation pattern is most like Dictyochrysa. The key differences are the much more basal location of the first crossvein in the anterior gradate series for Adamsochrysa. In Dictyochrysa the plcement if closer to the wing apex. The majority of the radial crossveins are structured into four to five successive distinct gradate series Adamsochrysa, but are a reticulated mesh structure in Dictyochrysa. In the former the radial crossveins do not fully reach the Rs forks, while in the latter they do.

Additionally along the hind margins of Adamsochrysa? sp A structures that are interpreted to be possible trichosors are present. Trichosors are a feature found in a number of neuropteran families, but are considered absent in Chrysopidae as a rule. Consisting on thickenings along the wing margins from which one to several hairs sprout, trichorsors are typically placed at the terminations of wing veins in the wing margin. Given that trichorsors have not been detected on any of the other Adamsochrysa specimens, there is the possibility that Adamsochrysa? sp A may belong to a yet undescribed genus instead.

=== Adamsochrysa aspera ===
Adamsochrysa aspera heads are smallish with long palpi around the mouthparts. The antennae have an inflated scape at the base and a stout pedicellus connecting the scape to the basal flagellomere that is nearly the same proportions as the flagellomere. The apical flagellomere segments are all between 2 and 2.5 times as long as they are wide. The thorax is only partially visible, with a short prothorax and indistinctly preserved mesothorax. The abdomen is fully preserved but not distinct, the terminal genitalia are noted to be similar in general appearance to Dictyochrysa terminalia. The legs are noted to be distinctly hairy.

The forewings range between 28–31.5 mm (1 1/8–1 1/4 in) long and 10–11.5 mm (3/8–7/16 in) wide with a probable hyaline coloration during life. The costal space, between the Costal vein along the fore margin of the wing, and the subcostal (Sc) vein is faired to a degree and has regularly spaced subcostal veinlets crossing it. Some of the veinlets are forked with different numbers on each forewing of a specimen. The Sc is long rung the wing length and terminating in the wing margin near the wing apex. The Radial 1 (R1) is of similar length and runs a mostly parallel course to the Sc, also terminating in the apical margin. Where they are preserved on wings, the space between the Sc and R1 have up to 20 crossveins basal to the pterostigmal area. The Rs branches off the R1 around the base region of the im cell, and runs a zigzag course into the wing apex branching between 22 and 24 times. The banches form a reticulate series of cells in the central area of the wing. The im cell is generally broad with up to seven sides.

Of the hind wing, less is known, with a single mostly complete wing described for the species. The length as preserved is 25.8 mm (1 in) and a full length that was estimated between 27 and 28 mm (1 1/16 and 1 1/8 in). The width is 8.7 mm (5/16 in) at the deepest giving the hind wing an overall smaller and thinner outline than seen in the forewings. The costal space is narrower than in forewings and has widely spaced simple crossveins in the section before the perostigma. The Sc is incompletely preserved while the R1 is full, running into margin just shy of the wing apex. the Psc vein is distinctly developed and has a slight zig-zag along its length. There are a total of four gradate crossvein series developed in the central section of wing.

=== Adamsochrysa wilsoni ===
The single known Adamsochrysa wilsoni wing is 24.8 mm (0.98 in) by 8.6 mm (0.34 in), thus smaller than A. aspera and Adamsochrysa. sp A wings but similar in length to A. sp B. As with the other species the forewing was likely fully hyaline in life. The costal space is flared mildly and there are rather widely space crossveinlets in the space basal to the pterostigma, while the veinlets apical of the pterostigma are more densely packed. Both the Sc and R1 ae long and like A. aspera terminate along the apical margin and near the wing apex respectively. The space between the Sc and R1 and then the Sc and the costal margin are all noted to be narrow. The Rs vein begins closer to the wing base than in A. aspera and there are 24 total branches. The space between the R1 and Rs is narrow in both the base and apical sections, but widens during the middle stretch, while the crossveins between the two are closely spaces for the full length of the space. In contrast to A. aspera the im cell is elongated into a subtrapezohedral outline, rather than being a squat seven sided outline. In A. wilsoni the terminal sections of the Median (M) and Rs branches near the wing base enter the Psc vein at an acute angle, but in Adamsochrysa . sp A the veins terminate at wider obtuse angles. The Median Posterior (MP) and Cubitus Anterior (CuA) veins form parallel sides of the cell adjoining the im cell where the MP vein is shared between the two cells. This cell has subparallel sides in Adamsochrysa . sp B where the two veins are diverging from each other distinctly. The There are a total of either five or six gradate crossvein series traversing the A. wilsoni wing, though only the outer most is complete. All the series are irregular in course and there are up to 20 visible crossveins on the outer series. The Pseudo-cubital (Psc) and pseudo-median (Psm) veins are both present and zig-zagged in course, but only the Psc is distinctly developed and it straightens from the zig-zag course in its basal section. Its estimated the CuA vein has between four an five branches, while the CuP only had two elongated branches.

=== Unnamed species ===
Two additional fossils were considered complete enough for description by Makarkin and Archibald, but also deemed too incomplete to formally name as new species. A third specimen was described but was not complete enough to determine if it was a member of the described or informal species, or a new species.

==== Adamsochrysa species "A" ====
The only specimen of Adamsochrysa species "A" is a possible male, missing portions of the head, thorax, and abdomen. All for wings are incomplete but present, as are four abdomen segment fragments, all preserved in lateral view in the matrix. The thorax is represented by a very crumpled mesothorax and the head mostly indistinguishable. On the preserved abdominal sclerites a series of small brown slots are present and interpreted to be microtholi. The small dome like bumps are present on males of just under half of the known chrysopid genera. However the function of microtholi is not known, and these were the first identified from a fossil specimen.

While incomplete the forewings are 26.6 mm (1.05 in) long and 9.0 mm (0.35 in) wide, giving an estimated total width in life of 9.2 mm (0.36 in). The forewings are wider then the hindwings which have a preserved length of 23.5 mm (0.93 in) but a width of only 8.0 mm (0.31 in). Both fore and hind wings are hyaline as is typical for the genus but have apical margins that are more rounded than in the other species. The placement and total number of gradate crossvein series is distinct in the specimen as is the angle of both Rs and M veins entering the Psc. Notably the wings a lightly hairy, a feature not seen in any other Adamsochrysa specimens. Around the pterostigmal area tiny hairs are present at the termination point of veins along the margin, usually as groups of possibly six hairs in a transverse row. Similarly the hind wing has rows of four to five hairs positioned between vein pairs, on slight thickenings on the margins. Makarkin and Archibald interpreted the raised bump and hair structures as probable trichorsors, which had not been identified in the family Chrysopidae before.

The possibility that the specimen belongs to one of the two named species was discounted by Makarkin and Archibald. They noted the size and slight wing shape variations could be sexually dimorphic characters, but the differences in the vein architecture are not sexually dimorphic characters within Chrysopids. As such it was tentatively assigned to Adamsochrysa as the closest character match, but due to the basal venation being missing in all four wings, no formal name was proposed for a new species. Additionally, the presence of possible trichosors on the wing margins, a feature not seen in any other living chrysopid, and only in one other fossil species, Pseudochrysopa harveyi from the Driftwood shales, could indicate that this specimen belongs to a different genus entirely.

==== Adamsochrysa species "B" ====
The body of the only known specimen is very poorly preserved with head thorax and abdomen present but very indistinct. The antennae are distinct and long with about 18 flagellomeres present, each unit being elongated and double the length as they are wide. Sections of all four wings are interpreted as being present, but all are torn or indistinctly preserved in the apical regions, with the forewings being around 16 mm (5/8 in) in the fossil and an estimated 25–27 mm (1–1 1/16 in) in life. The hindwings were considered too fragmentary for estimation of original lengths.

According to Makarkin and Archibald, the overall dense venation plus size of the specimen exclude it being a member of the genus Pseudochrysopa while placement in Okanaganochrysa was rejected due to the length of the anterior gradate series' basal crossvein, witch is long in this specimen. the specimen is closest in preserved characters to A. wilsoni, but they are distinguished by the MP and CuA veins running parallel in the cell next to the im for A. wilsoni. In this specimen the two veins are distinctly diverging from each other.

==== Adamsochrysa indeterminate specimen ====
The one additional specimen which Makarkin and Archibald provisionally referred to the genus is of an overlapping pair of forewings with few distinct venation features preserved in distinct detail. The wings have a length of 26.2 mm (1 1/16 in) preserved and were estimated to be around 27–27.5 mm (1 1/16–1 1/16 in) in life. They have a width of about 8.8 mm (3/8 in) as preserved and a life total width estimate of between 9 and 9.2 mm (3/8 and 3/8 in). Provisional assignment to Adamsochrysa was based on the size proportions and the few visible vein elements preserved, such as those in the costal area. They noted however that the placement is a result of the lack of other generic characters to make a better assessment from.

== Paleobiology ==
As a nothochrysine green lacewing, Adamsochrysa was likely confined to the upper microthermal to lower mesothermal conditions of the Okanagan Highlands. Members of the subfamily are nearly universally restricted to areas with moderate temperatures, few days of below freezing temperature. Coastal maritime and Mediterranean climates of the Southern and Northern Hemispheres are the regions with highest diversity. In the Eocene nothochrysine lacewings were the dominant green lacewing group of the family, while Chrysopinae were rare, but even at that time, the known sites all have the same climate ranges as where modern nothochrysines live.

== Paleoenvironment ==
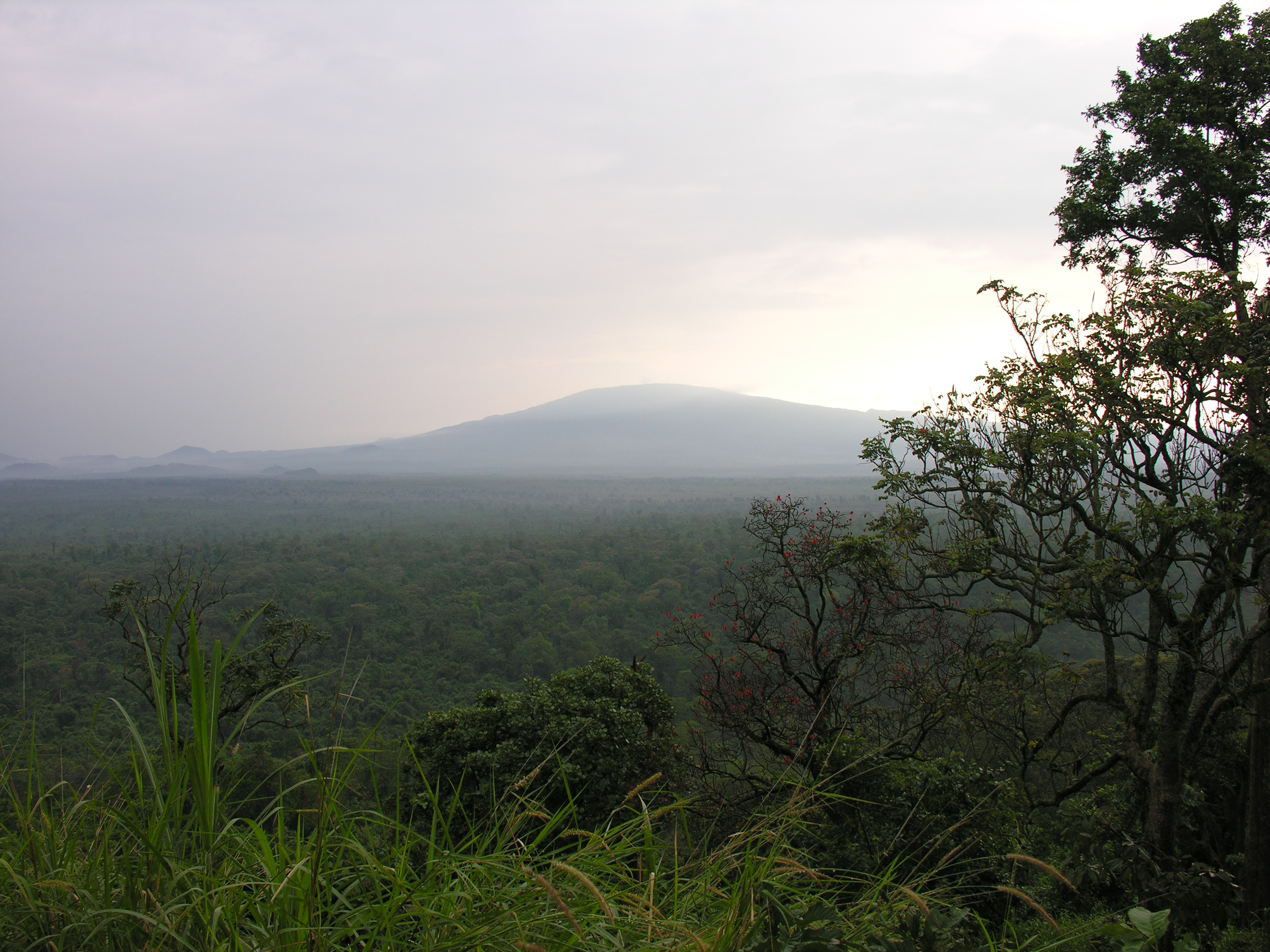
Virunga National Park, Albertine Rift, Africa

Both the Republic and McAbee sites are part of a larger fossil site system collectively known as the Eocene Okanagan Highlands. The highlands, including the Early Eocene formations between Driftwood Canyon at the north and Republic at the south, have been described as one of the "Great Canadian Lagerstätten" based on the diversity, quality and unique nature of the paleofloral and paleofaunal biotas that are preserved. The highlands temperate biome preserved across a large transect of lakes recorded many of the earliest appearances of modern genera, while also documenting the last stands of ancient lines. The warm temperate highland floras in association with downfaulted lacustrine basins and active volcanism are noted to have no exact modern equivalents. This is due to the more seasonally equitable conditions of the Early Eocene, resulting in much lower seasonal temperature shifts. However, the highlands have been compared to the upland ecological islands in the Virunga Mountains within the Albertine Rift of the African rift valley.

The Republic and McAbee upland lake systems were surrounded by a warm temperate ecosystem with nearby volcanism. The highlands likely had a mesic upper microthermal to lower mesothermal climate, in which winter temperatures rarely dropped low enough for snow, and which were seasonably equitable. The paleoforests surrounding the lakes have been described as precursors to the modern temperate broadleaf and mixed forests of Eastern North America and Eastern Asia. Based on the fossil biotas the lakes were higher and cooler than the coeval coastal forests preserved in the Puget Group and Chuckanut Formation of Western Washington, which are described as lowland tropical forest ecosystems. Estimates of the paleoelevation range between 0.7 and 1.2 km (0.43 and 0.75 mi) higher than the coastal forests. This is consistent with the paleoelevation estimates for the lake systems, which range between 1.1 and 2.9 km (1,100 and 2,900 m), which is similar to the modern elevation 0.8 km (0.50 mi), but higher.

Estimates of the mean annual temperature have been derived from climate leaf analysis multivariate program (CLAMP) and leaf margin analysis (LMA) of the Republic and McAbee paleofloras. The CLAMP results after multiple linear regressions for Republic gave a mean annual temperature of approximately 8.0 °C (46.4 °F), with the LMA giving 9.2 ± 2.0 °C (48.6 ± 3.6 °F). CLAMP results from McAbee returned the higher 10.7 °C (51.3 °F) which was supported by the 10.4 ± 2.4 °C (50.7 ± 4.3 °F) returned from the LMA. These are lower than the mean annual temperature estimates given for the coastal Puget Group, which is estimated to have been between 15 and 18.6 °C (59.0 and 65.5 °F). The bioclimatic analysis for Republic and McAbee suggests mean annual precipitation amounts of 115 ± 39 cm (45 ± 15 in) and 108 ± 35 cm (43 ± 14 in) respectively.
