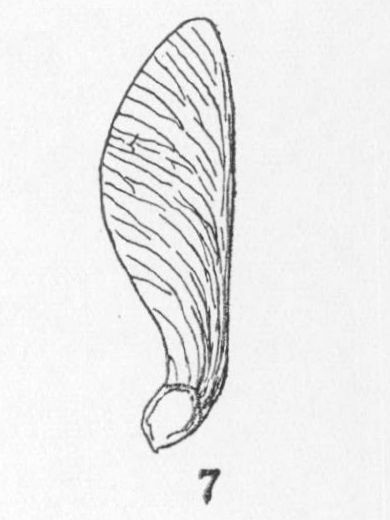

Scientific classification
- Kingdom: Plantae
- Clade: Tracheophytes
- Clade: Angiosperms
- Clade: Eudicots
- Clade: Rosids
- Order: Sapindales
- Family: Sapindaceae
- Genus: Acer
- Species: †A. wehri

Binomial name
- †Acer wehri Wolfe & Tanai

= Acer wehri =

Acer wehri Temporal range: Ypresian

Extinct species of maple

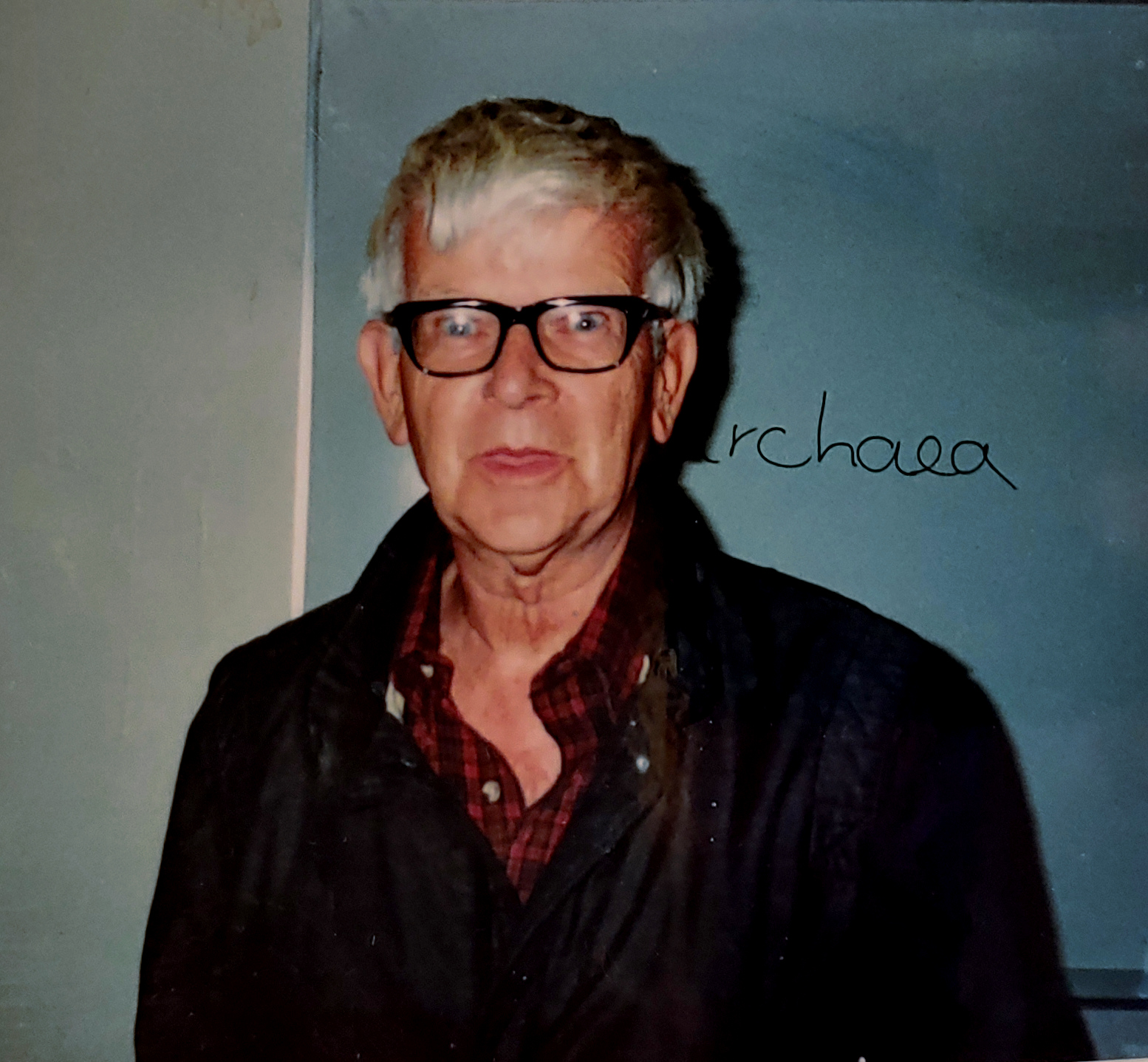
Wesley Wehr in 1998

Acer wehri is an extinct species of maple found in the U.S. state of Washington and the Canadian province of British Columbia. The species was placed into the extinct Acer Section Glabroides based on similarity to other Eocene maple species. The species is only known from samaras.

== Distribution ==
Fruits eventually attributed to Acer wehri were first reported from the Chu Chua Formation in the North Thompson River valley of central eastern British Columbia. Further Eocene Okanagan Highlands occurrences have been found in the Allenby Formation at One Mile Creek near Princeton, Coldwater Beds outcrops at Quilchena, British Columbia, Tranquille Formation at the McAbee Fossil Beds, and the Klondike Mountain Formation around Republic, Washington. All five formations are of similar age, with radiometric dating at Princeton, Quilchena, McAbee, and Republic placing the sites in the Late Ypresian of the Early Eocene. While dating has not been performed on the Chu Chua shales, both floral and faunal correlations between the other Eocene Okanagan highlands sites confidently correlate all the sites.

Early estimates of the highlands sites ranged from Miocene to Eocene in age. The age of the Klondike Mountain Formation was debated for many years, with plant fossils suggesting a Late Oligocene or Early Miocene age, and the first descriptions of species from the area included them in the Middle Miocene Latah Formation. By the early 1960s the Klondike Mountain formation was thought to be late Oligocene in age. Potassium–argon radiometric dating of samples taken near the Tom Thumb mine in 1966 resulted in a tentative 55 million years old age. Further refinement of sample dating has yielded an approximately Early Eocene, Ypresian age, being radiometrically dated as 49.4 million years old. A 2003 report using dating of detrital zircon crystals with the tuffs of the Klondike Mountain Formation had been dated to 49.42 ± 0.54 million years ago, the youngest of the Okanagan Highlands sites. A 2021 report revised the possible oldest age to around 51.2 ± 0.1 million years ago based on isotopic data from zircon crystals.

== History and classification ==
The oldest mentions of maple fossils come from several of the British Columbia fossil sites. An isolated fossil seed found at Stump Lake was briefly mentioned by John W. Dawson in 1890 though he did not place it to species. An additional fruit was later described by Edward W. Berry (1926) from Joseph Creek near Chu Chua as belonging to the fossil Acer macropterum of Oswald Heer (1869). Berry also noted the earlier record from Dawson and included it in the species as well. The name Heer coined, however, was problematic. When first coined it was already a junior homonym, with the binomial already having been published by Roberto de Visiani (1860). As a result the fossils were given a new name Acer grahamensis by Frank Knowlton and Theodore Cockerell in 1919. As such the British Columbian material was referred to "Acer grahamensis" for a number of decades. That species was reassessed in 1987 by Jack Wolfe and Toshimasa Tanai who deemed the type fossils the species were based on as lacking. They noted that A. grahamensis was based on fragmentary fossils lacking diagnostic features, and reassigned the fossils later referred to "A. grahamensis" as other paleospecies. Wolfe and Tanai included the Chu Chua and Stump Lake fossils along with specimens from One Mile Creek and around Republic in a newly named species Acer wehri.

A new set of type fossils from Republic and Princeton was chosen. The holotype, UWBM 39728 A&B, plus two paratypes, UWBM 56257 and UWBM 56260 were in the Burke Museum of Natural History and Culture collections. A third paratype, USNM 396039, was a National Museum of Natural History fossil, and the fourth paratype was Geological Survey of Canada specimen GSC 82970A. The type locality of the species was chosen to be the Republic location "A0307" also called the Corner Lot. Wolfe and Tanai coined the species name wehri in honor of Wesley C. Wehr, classical musician, Northwest School artist and amateur paleobotanist. They noted that Wehr supplied immeasurable assistance and encouragement to the authors, and made available a majority of the Republic maple specimens along with fossils from many other Pacific Northwest localities.

== Description ==
The samaras of A. wehri have an generally triangular and slightly inflated nutlet with equal 0.5–0.7 mm (0.020–0.028 in) long sides. In the middle of the nutlet passing from attachment scar to wing is a wide flange. The attachment scar is 0.5–0.7 mm (0.020–0.028 in) long transitioning into a distal keel. The paired samaras have a 50°-55° attachment angle to the whole samara while the nutlets have a 30°-40° angle to the wing back. The distal region of the nutlet through lower wing margin form a broad u-shaped sulcus. About 10 indistinct veins appear on the apical half of the nutlet pass in parallel across the nutlet into the wing base. The wing back is straight and forms a narrow rounded tip. The overall length of the samara is approximately 2.5–3.2 centimetres (0.98–1.26 in) and a wing width of 0.8–1.0 centimetre (0.31–0.39 in). The veins in the wing back curve downward across the wing blade at angles ranging between 10°-30°. After curving down into the blade each vein branches between three and five times with many of the veinlets fusing between each large vein.

Wolfe and Tanai called out the similarity of A. wehri to several other "Section Glabroides" species they described. Acer cuprovallis is smaller with a shorter nutlet flange in the same median position. Acer elkoanum is smaller and with less vascularization on the nutlet plus lower attachment angle. Acer jarbidgianum has a similarly placed flange, though smaller, and also has a distal keel on the attachment scar. However the nutlet is rounded not triangular and as with the species is generally smaller then A. wehri.

== Paleoenvironment ==
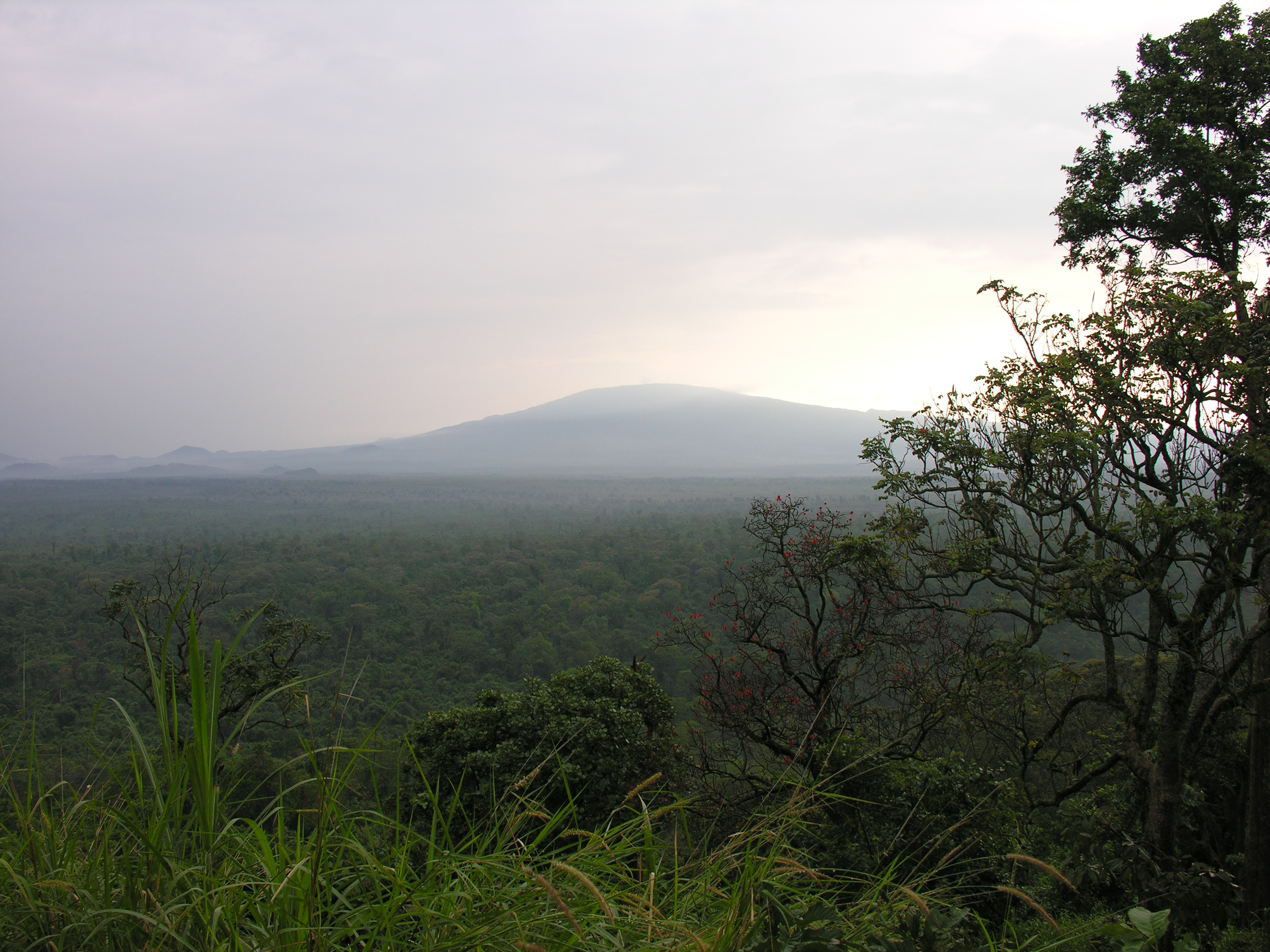
Virunga National Park, Albertine Rift, Africa

The Republic and British Columbian sites are part of a larger fossil site system collectively known as the Eocene Okanagan Highlands. The highlands, including the Early Eocene formations between Driftwood Canyon at the north and Republic at the south, have been described as one of the "Great Canadian Lagerstätten" based on the diversity, quality and unique nature of the paleofloral and paleofaunal biotas that are preserved. The highlands temperate biome preserved across a large transect of lakes recorded many of the earliest appearances of modern genera, while also documenting the last stands of ancient lines. The warm temperate highland floras in association with downfaulted lacustrine basins and active volcanism are noted to have no exact modern equivalents. This is due to the more seasonally equitable conditions of the Early Eocene, resulting in much lower seasonal temperature shifts. However, the highlands have been compared to the upland ecological islands of the Virunga Mountains within the African rift valleys Albertine Rift.

The formations represent a long upland lake system series that was surrounded by a warm temperate ecosystem with nearby volcanism dating from during and just after the early Eocene climatic optimum. The Okanagan Highlands likely had a mesic upper microthermal to lower mesothermal climate, in which winter temperatures rarely dropped low enough for snow, and which were seasonably equitable. The paleoforest surrounding the lakes have been described as precursors to the modern temperate broadleaf and mixed forests of Eastern North America and Eastern Asia. Based on the fossil biotas, the lakes were higher and cooler than the coeval coastal forests preserved in the Puget Group and Chuckanut Formation of Western Washington, which are described as lowland tropical forest ecosystems. Estimates of the paleoelevation range between 0.7 and 1.2 km (0.43 and 0.75 mi) higher than the coastal forests. This is consistent with the paleoelevation estimates for the lake systems, which range between 1.1 and 2.9 km (1,100 and 2,900 m), which is similar to the modern elevation 0.8 km (0.50 mi), but higher.

Estimates of the mean annual temperature have been derived from climate leaf analysis multivariate program (CLAMP) and leaf margin analysis (LMA) of the Republic and McAbee paleofloras. The CLAMP results after multiple linear regressions for Republic gave a mean annual temperature of approximately 8.0 °C (46.4 °F), with the LMA giving 9.2 ± 2.0 °C (48.6 ± 3.6 °F). CLAMP results from McAbee returned the higher 10.7 °C (51.3 °F) which was supported by the 10.4 ± 2.4 °C (50.7 ± 4.3 °F) returned from the LMA. These are lower than the mean annual temperature estimates given for the coastal Puget Group, which is estimated to have been between 15 and 18.6 °C (59.0 and 65.5 °F). The bioclimatic analysis for Republic and McAbee suggests mean annual precipitation amounts of 115 ± 39 cm (45 ± 15 in) and 108 ± 35 cm (43 ± 14 in) respectively.
