= Megathermal =

In climatology, the term megathermal (or less commonly, macrothermal; from Ancient Greek mégas 'large', makrós 'tall', thermós 'warm, hot') is sometimes used as a synonym for tropical. In order for a particular place to qualify as having a megathermal climate, every single month out of the year must have an average temperature of 18 °C or above.

== Areas ==
Mega-thermal climates mainly exist in the tropics. It ranges from southeast Asia and most of India to the most northern regions of Australia as well as southern parts of Mexico and Florida, nearly all of Central America and most of Brazil. An arid type prevails in some of northern Africa, while in the center of the continent and parts of Madagascar the climate stays humid. Many islands, especially in the Pacific Ocean, also have megathermal climates.

== Variants ==
Megathermal climates are sometimes split into two temperature-based subsets – equatorial and tropical (the latter used here in the sense of "outer tropical") – with "equatorial" denoting little or no variation in temperature throughout the year and "tropical" denoting significant seasonal temperature variation, even though no month has an average temperature of below 18 °C. In addition, what temperature fluctuations do exist in an equatorial climate will typically bear no relationship to the astronomical seasons for the applicable side of the equator, while in the (outer) tropical subtype the temperature will move in concert with the seasons, the time of higher sun and longer days being warmest and the time of lower sun and shorter days coolest.

These climates can also be subdivided on the basis of rainfall, as examples of humid, seasonal, semiarid and arid places can all be found within the megathermal category (although the region of arid megathermal climate is small compared with the extent of deserts existing in other climate zones, particularly the neighboring subtropical zone).

== See also ==
- Mesothermal
- Microthermal
- Tropical climate
- Tropics
