= Tropical climate =

Major climate group in Köppen classification

Locations where tropical climates occur, with subtypes listed, abbreviations in the Köppen climate classification in parentheses, and the equator highlighted: Tropical rainforest climate (Af), Tropical monsoon climate (Am), Tropical savanna climate (Dry summer: As, dry winter: Aw).

Tropical climate is the first of the five major climate groups in the Köppen climate classification identified with the letter A. Tropical climates are defined by a monthly average temperature of 18 °C (64 °F) or higher in the coolest month, featuring hot temperatures and high humidity all year-round. Annual precipitation is often abundant in tropical climates, and shows a seasonal rhythm but may have seasonal dryness to varying degrees. There are normally only two seasons in tropical climates, a wet (rainy/monsoon) season and a dry season. The annual temperature range in tropical climates is normally very small. Sunlight is intense in these climates.

There are three basic types of tropical climates within the tropical climate group: tropical rainforest climate (Af), tropical monsoon climate (Am) and tropical savanna or tropical wet and dry climate (Aw for dry winters, and As for dry summers), which are classified and distinguished by the precipitation levels of the driest month in those regions.

== Köppen climate classification ==
The Köppen climate classification is the most widely used climate classification system. It defines a tropical climate as a region where the mean temperature of the coldest month is greater than or equal to 18 °C (64 °F) and does not fit into the criteria for B-group climates, classifying them as an A-group (tropical climate group). A-group regions are usually found in the tropics, below 23.5 latitude in both the southern and northern hemispheres; they include areas around the Equator, Central America, North-central portions of South America, central Africa, southern portions of Asia and parts of North Australia and the Pacific Ocean islands.

In Group A, there are three types of this climate: the tropical rainforest climate (Af), tropical monsoon climate (Am) and tropical wet and dry or savanna climate (Aw or As). All of the three climates are classified by their P_{dry} (short for precipitation of the driest month). Tropical rainforest climate's P_{dry} should be greater than or equal 60 mm (2.4 in). Tropical monsoon climate's P_{dry} should be in the range from $(100 - \tfrac{mean\ annual\ precipitation\ in\ mm}{25})$ to 60 mm. Tropical wet and dry or savanna climate's P_{dry} should be less than $(100 - \tfrac{mean\ annual\ precipitation\ in\ mm}{25})$.

Tropical rainforest climate region

Tropical monsoon climate region

Tropical savanna climate

== Tropical climate biome ==
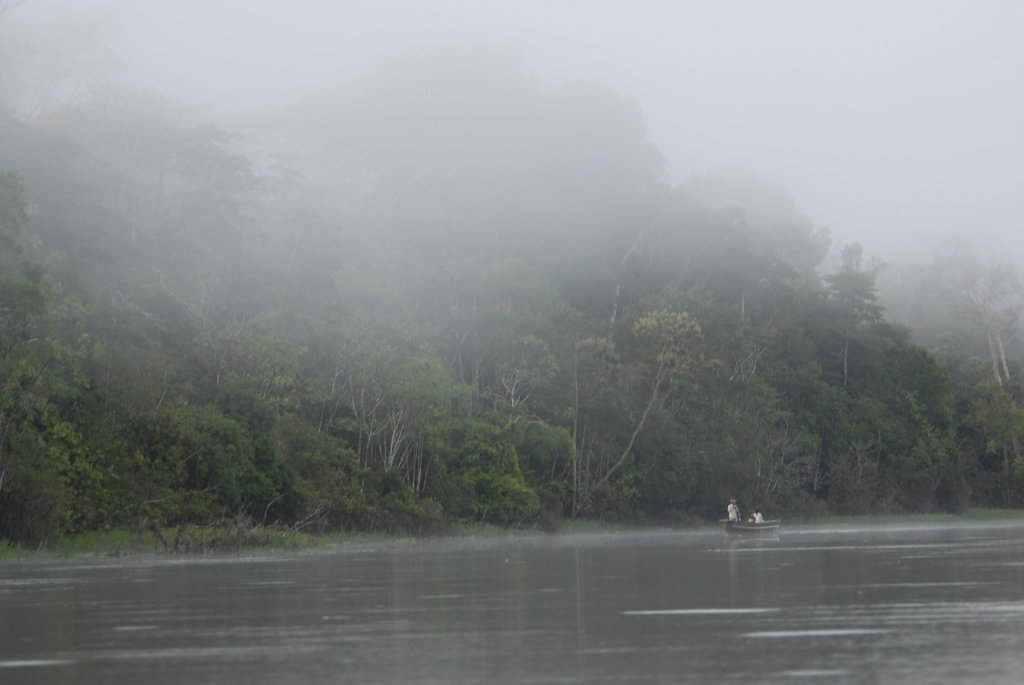
Amazon rainforest near Iquitos, Peru.

Tropical climates normally have only two seasons, a wet season and a dry season. Depending on the location of the region, the wet and dry seasons can have varying duration. Annual temperature changes in the tropics are small. Due to the high temperatures and abundant rainfall, much of the plant life grows throughout the year. High temperature and humidity is the most suitable environment for epiphytes to grow. In many tropical climates, vegetation grows in layers: shrubs under tall trees, bushes under shrubs and grasses under bushes. Tropical plants are rich in resources, including coffee, cocoa and oil palm. Listed below are the types of vegetation unique to each of the three climates that make up the tropical climate biome.

=== Natural vegetation ===
Tropical rainforest vegetation including: Bengal bamboo, bougainvillea, curare, coconut tree, durian and banana.

Tropical monsoon vegetation including: teak, deodar, rosewood, sandalwood and bamboo.

Tropical wet and dry or savanna vegetation including: acacia senegal, elephant grass, jarrah tree, gum tree eucalyptus and whistling thorn.

Biak, Indonesia

Climate chart (precipitation, max. and min. temperature)
J	F	M	A	M	J	J	A	S	O	N	D
250 29 25	240 28 25	250 29 25	200 29 25	250 29 25	230 29 25	250 28 25	240 29 25	220 29 25	180 29 25	190 30 25	230 29 25
- █ Average max. and min. temperatures in °C
- █ Precipitation totals in mm
Imperial conversion
J	F	M	A	M	J	J	A	S	O	N	D
9.8 84 77	9.4 82 77	9.8 84 77	7.9 84 77	9.8 84 77	9.1 84 77	9.8 82 77	9.4 84 77	8.7 84 77	7.1 84 77	7.5 86 77	9.1 84 77
- █ Average max. and min. temperatures in °F
- █ Precipitation totals in inches

== Tropical rainforest climate ==
The Köppen classification identifies tropical rainforest climates (Zone Af: f = "feucht", German for moist) as usually having north and south latitudinal ranges of just 5-10 degrees from the equator. Tropical rainforest climates have high temperatures: the yearly average temperature is normally between 21 and 30 °C (70 and 86 °F). The precipitation can reach over 100 inches a year. The seasons are evenly distributed throughout the year, and there is almost no drought period here. Regions that contain tropical rainforest climate mainly include the upper Amazon basin of South America, the Northern Zaire (Congo) basin of Africa, and the islands of the East Indies.

The tropical rainforest climate differs from other subtypes of tropical climates as it has more kinds of trees due to its precipitation. The large number of trees contribute back to the humidity of the climate because of the transpiration, which is the process of water evaporated from the surface of living plants to the atmosphere. The warmth and abundant precipitation heavily contributes to the diversity and characteristics of vegetations under the tropical rainforest climate. The vegetations develop a vertical stratification and various growth forms to receive enough sunlight, which is unusual under other types of climate.

== Tropical monsoon climate ==
Miami

Climate chart (precipitation, max. and min. temperature)
J	F	M	A	M	J	J	A	S	O	N	D
51 24 15	53 25 16	61 26 18	72 28 20	158 30 22	237 31 24	145 32 25	193 32 25	194 31 24	143 29 22	68 27 19	47 25 16
- █ Average max. and min. temperatures in °C
- █ Precipitation totals in mm
Imperial conversion
J	F	M	A	M	J	J	A	S	O	N	D
2 75 59	2.1 76 60	2.4 79 64	2.9 82 68	6.2 85 72	9.3 88 75	5.7 89 76	7.6 89 77	7.6 88 76	5.6 85 72	2.7 80 67	1.8 77 62
- █ Average max. and min. temperatures in °F
- █ Precipitation totals in inches

The Köppen classification tool identifies tropical monsoon climate as having small annual temperature ranges, high temperatures, and plentiful precipitation. This climate also has a short dry season which almost always occurs in the winter. The tropical monsoon climate is often found within countries in the south and southeast Asia region between the latitude of 10 degrees north and the Tropic of Cancer. It can also be found in West Africa and South America. The annual temperature of regions under tropical monsoon climate is also stable.

The tropical monsoon climate has the following main characteristic. The average annual temperature is around 27.05 °C (80.69 °F) and has an average annual temperature range of about 3.6 °C (6 °F). Distinction between wet and drought seasons, the tropical monsoon climate is different from other tropical climates because of its uneven precipitation throughout the year.

There are three main seasons of tropical monsoon climate: the cool dry season is from fall to late winter, the hot dry season is in the spring and the rainy or monsoon season is near or during the summer months.

The tropical monsoon forest mainly consists of three layered structures. The first layer is the surface layer which is a very dense layer of shrubs and grasses. The second layer is the understory layer with trees about 15 meters tall. The top layer is called the canopy tree layer which has trees from 25 to 40 meters tall and those trees grow closely while above is the emergent layer with sporadic trees taller than 35 meters.

== Tropical savanna or wet and dry climate ==
Tropical savanna climates, or tropical wet and dry climates, are mainly located between the 10° and 25° north-south latitudes, and often occur at the outer margins of the tropics. Typical regions include central Africa, parts of South America, as well as northern and eastern Australia. The temperature range of savanna climate is between 20 and 30 °C (68 and 86 °F). In summer, the temperature is between 25 °C and 30 °C, while in winter the temperature is between 20 °C and 30 °C, but still stays above an 18 °C mean. The annual precipitation is between 700 and 1000 mm. The driest months are generally in the winter and they have less than 60 mm of rainfall (often much less).

Regions under the savanna climate usually have lands covered with flat grassland vegetation with areas of woodlands. Those grassland biomes cover almost 20% of the Earth's surface. The grassland vegetation types include Rhodes grass, red oats grass, star grass and lemongrass.

== See also ==
- Humid subtropical climate
- Megathermal
- Subtropics
