= Vital effects =

Biological impacts on geochemical records

Vital effects are biological impacts on geochemical records. Many marine organisms, ranging from zooplankton (e.g. foraminifera) to phytoplankton (e.g. diatoms) to reef builders (e.g. coral), create shells or skeletons from chemical compounds dissolved in seawater. This process, which is also called biomineralization, therefore records the chemical signature of seawater during the time of shell formation. However, different species have different metabolism and physiology, causing them to create their shells in different ways. These biological distinctions cause species to record slightly different chemical signatures in their shells; these differences are known as vital effects.

== Importance to scientific research ==
Vital effects are relevant to study because of their influence on paleoclimatic interpretations. Scientists study the isotopic composition of marine organisms' shells that have been preserved in marine sediment in order to reconstruct past environmental conditions. The earliest example of this work is using oxygen isotopes from the calcium carbonate (CaCO_{3}) in belemnites to reconstruct paleotemperatures. It is important to understand vital effects because they affect how paleoclimatic data are interpreted, which influences how scientists predict future impacts of climate change.

=== Examples ===
==== Foraminifera ====
Foraminifera are widely used for paleoclimatic and paleoceanographic research because of the oxygen isotopes in their calcium carbonate shells. Oxygen isotopes, or δ^{18}O, are used to interpret past temperature and ice volume. Foraminifera also incorporate trace amounts of boron in their shells, which is used to reconstruct past pH. Foraminiferal isotopic composition is affected by factors such as algal symbionts or species-specific physiology. The influence of such vital effects can be determined via culture experiments.

==== Coral ====
Similar to foraminifera shells, the isotopic composition of coral skeletons is used to reconstruct past temperature, CO_{2} concentrations, and pH. Vital effects arise from algal symbionts and biological responses to changes in conditions such as pH. Again, culture experiments are used to quantify vital effects and calibrate the use of coral isotopic composition as a proxy.

==== Diatoms ====
Diatoms can also be used to study oxygen isotopes and are especially useful in regions of the ocean where foraminifera do not preserve in marine sediments. One example of vital effects in diatoms is a difference in δ^{18}O between two different species, Coscinodiscus marginatus and Coscinodiscus radiatus, which is attributed to their difference in size.
