= Paleothermometer =

Methodology for the study of ancient temperatures

A paleothermometer is a methodology that provides an estimate of the ambient temperature at the time of formation of a natural material. Most paleothermometers are based on empirically calibrated proxy relationships, such as trace element ratios in biominerals and proxies from organic molecules.

== Common paleothermometers ==
=== δ^{18}O ===
Scientists use the isotopic ratio of ^{18}O to ^{16}O in ice, tree tissue, coral skeletons, speleothems, and sediments to calculate past temperature and/or estimate ice sheet volumes.

Ocean water is mostly H_{2}^{16}O, with small amounts of HD^{16}O and H_{2}^{18}O. Fractionation occurs during changes between condensed and vapor phases. The vapor pressure of heavier isotopes is lower, so vapor will have a lower ratio of heavy isotopes (it is more isotopically negative) than the pool from which it evaporated. Conversely, when the vapor condenses, the precipitation will have a higher ratio of heavy isotopes than the vapor from which it precipitated. As an air mass moves inland or from equator to poles, isotopically "heavy" water rains out, and the residual fraction is lighter (isotopically negative).

Oxygen isotope values are often reported in terms of standard mean ocean water, or SMOW. The difference from SMOW is expressed as

$$\delta\ce{^{18}O} = 1000 \times \left[\ce{\frac{^{18}O}{^{16}O}}\Bigg/\left(\ce{\frac{^{18}O}{^{16}O}}\right)_\ce{SMOW} - 1\right]$$;

and a similar formula for δD.

=== Trace Element Ratios in Biominerals ===
Magnesium (Mg) is incorporated into the calcite shells (tests) of planktic and benthic foraminifera as a trace element. Because the incorporation of Mg as an impurity in calcite is endothermic, more is incorporated into the growing crystal at higher temperatures. Therefore, a high Mg/Ca ratio implies a high temperature, although ecological factors may confound the signal. Mg has a long residence time in the ocean, and so it is possible to largely ignore the effect of changes in seawater Mg/Ca on the signal. Mg/Ca ratios can sometimes underestimate seawater temperatures by way of the dissolution of foraminifer shells, which lowers Mg/Ca values.

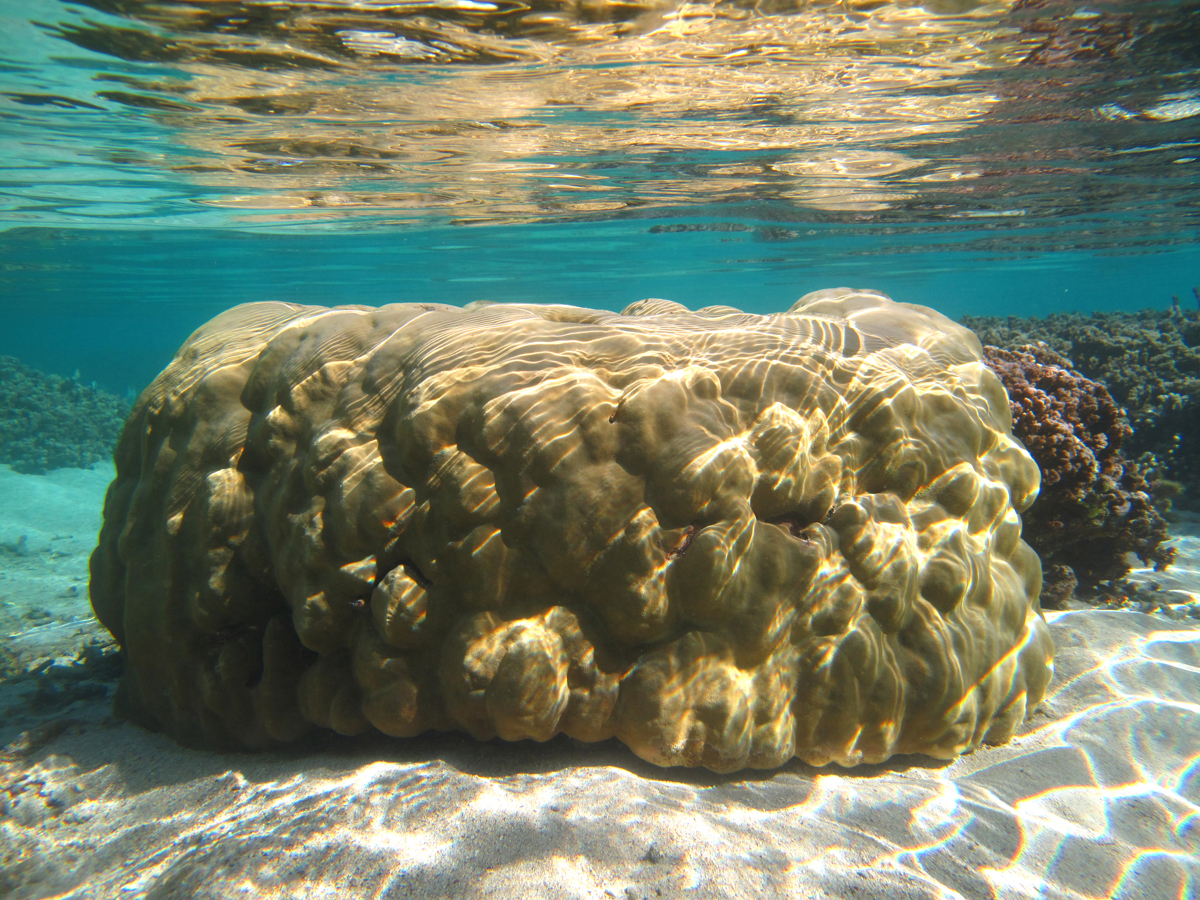
The mounding coral Porites lutea, commonly used in Sr/Ca paleotemperature reconstructions.

Carbonate chemistry (which is pH-dependent) can also affect the incorporation of Mg into calcium carbonate. For this reason, researchers use boron isotopes (a proxy for ocean pH) or atmospheric CO_{2} values (which can be used to estimate ocean pH) from the period of interest to apply a correction to the Mg/Ca record. This correction isolates changes in Mg/Ca due solely to temperature variability, allowing for a more robust temperature reconstruction.

Strontium (Sr) incorporates in coral aragonite, the mineral that corals precipitate for their skeletons. At higher temperatures, the incorporation of Sr impurities in the aragonite decreases, and the Sr/Ca ratio in the coral skeletons will be lower. Corals can provide exceptionally high resolution (sub-monthly) temperature records, particularly in taxa with a higher growth rate. High resolution records are necessary for reconstructing seasonal temperature variation, which is currently a source of uncertainty in climate models. Variability in the Sr/Ca ratio of seawater, particularly in near-coast areas with high river runoff, can introduce error to Sr/Ca temperature interpretations. Another source of error can come from "vital effects," or variations in geochemistry that come from the physiology of the coral rather than variation in temperature. For instance, seasonal variability in the coral growth rate may change the incorporation of Sr/Ca, adding noise to the geochemical record. Another potential source of error in Sr/Ca calibrations comes from diagenesis, in which part of the original aragonite mineral dissolves and a new mineral recrystallizes in its place. Because these new minerals are not forming under the same conditions as the original skeletal mineral, they can introduce false temperature anomalies to the time series.

Sr/Ca temperature reconstructions require calibration based on a modern member of the same taxa sampled from the same location. This requirement can be limiting when modern analogues are unavailable. However, some researchers are exploring the potential of developing "universal" coral paleo-thermometers using multiple temperature-influenced trace element ratios in tandem. These elements include strontium, magnesium, boron (B), uranium (U), and lithium (Li). B/Ca and U/Ca have been found to vary with temperature, but are also strongly influenced by the pH and carbonate concentration in the coral's internal pool of calcifying fluid.

=== Proxies from Organic Molecules ===
Some marine organisms will alter the composition of their cell membranes in response to temperature, allowing for the variations in these compositions to serve as sea surface temperature proxies. There is a positive correlation between temperature and the number of cyclopentane rings found in the membranes of oceanic Archaea. Changing compositions in accumulations of Archaea in marine sediment cores are thus used to reconstruct paleotemperature. This relationship is known as the TEX_{86} temperature proxy, named for the 86 carbon atoms in the lipid molecules. A similar proxy uses variations in alkenone saturation in phytoplankton membranes. In contrast with carbonate paleothermometers, alkenone thermometry and TEX_{86} remain robust for a matrix altered by diagenesis.

=== Leaf physiognomy ===
The characteristic leaf sizes, shapes and prevalence of features such as drip tips ('leaf or foliar physiognomy') differs between tropical rainforests (many species with large leaves with smooth edges and drip tips) and temperate deciduous forests (smaller leaf size classes common, toothed edges common), and is often continuously variable between sites along climatic gradients, such as from hot to cold climates, or high to low precipitation. This variation between sites along environmental gradients reflects adaptive compromises by the species present to balance the need to capture light energy, manage heat gain and loss, while maximising the efficiency of gas exchange, transpiration and photosynthesis. Quantitative analyses of modern vegetation leaf physiognomy and climate responses along environmental gradients have been largely univariate, but multivariate approaches integrate multiple leaf characters and climatic parameters. Temperature has been estimated (to varying degrees of fidelity) using leaf physiognomy for Late Cretaceous and Cenozoic leaf floras, principally using two main approaches:

==== Leaf margin analysis ====
A univariate approach that is based on the observation that the proportion of woody dicot species with smooth (i.e. non-toothed) leaf margins (0 ≤ P_{margin} ≤ 1) in vegetation varies proportionately with mean annual temperature (MAT). Requires the fossil flora to be segregated into morphotypes (i.e. 'species'), but does not require their identification. The original LMA regression equation was derived for East Asian forests, and is:

MAT = 1.141 +(30.6 × P_{margin}), standard error ± 2.0 °C	1

The error of the estimate for LMA is expressed as the binomial sampling error:

$\sigma\lbrack\text{LMA}\rbrack = c \sqrt{\frac{P_\text{margin} (1 - P_\text{margin})}{r}}$	2

where c is the slope from the LMA regression equation, P_{margin} as used in (1), and r is the number of species scored for leaf margin type for the individual fossil leaf flora. LMA calibrations have been derived for major world regions, including North America, Europe, South America, and Australia. Riparian and wetland environments have a slightly different regression equation, because they have proportionally fewer smooth-margined plants. It is

MAT = 2.223 +(36.3 × P_{margin}), standard error ± 2.0 °C	1′

==== CLAMP (Climate leaf analysis multivariate program) ====
CLAMP is a multivariate approach largely based on a data set of primarily western hemisphere vegetation, subsequently added to with datasets from additional world regional vegetation. Canonical Correlation Analysis is used combining 31 leaf characters, but leaf margin type represented a significant component of the relationship between physiognomic states and temperature. Using CLAMP, MAT is estimated with small standard errors (e.g. CCA ± 0.7–1.0 °C). Additional temperature parameters can be estimated using CLAMP, such as the coldest month mean temperature (CMMT) and the warmest month mean temperature (WMMT) which provide estimates for winter and summer mean conditions respectively.

=== Species Assemblage Analysis ===
Because species have different temperature tolerances, variations in species assemblage in sediment cores can represent changes in temperature. Core top assemblages are used to establish a relationship between species prevalence and temperature for temperature-sensitive taxa. These relationships are then used to infer temperature from data down core. Sources of error include the mixing rate (bioturbation) in sediments, which can blend together assemblages deposited at different times.

=== ^{13}C-^{18}O bonds in carbonates ===
There is a slight thermodynamic tendency for heavy isotopes to form bonds with each other, in excess of what would be expected from a stochastic or random distribution of the same concentration of isotopes. The excess is greatest at low temperature (see Van 't Hoff equation), with the isotopic distribution becoming more randomized at higher temperature. Along with the closely related phenomenon of equilibrium isotope fractionation, this effect arises from differences in zero point energy among isotopologues. Carbonate minerals like calcite contain CO_{3}^{2−} groups that can be converted to CO_{2} gas by reaction with concentrated phosphoric acid. The CO_{2} gas is analyzed with a mass spectrometer, to determine the abundances of isotopologues. The parameter Δ_{47} is the measured difference in concentration between isotopologues with a mass of 47 u (as compared to 44) in a sample and a hypothetical sample with the same bulk isotopic composition, but a stochastic distribution of heavy isotopes. Δ_{47} is correlated to the inverse square of temperature. Thus, Δ_{47} measurements provide an estimation of the temperature at which a carbonate formed. ^{13}C-^{18}O paleothermometry does not require prior knowledge of the concentration of ^{18}O in the water (which the δ^{18}O method does). This allows the ^{13}C-^{18}O paleothermometer to be applied to some samples, including freshwater carbonates and very old rocks, with less ambiguity than other isotope-based methods. The method is presently limited by the very low concentration of isotopologues of mass 47 or higher in CO_{2} produced from natural carbonates, and by the scarcity of instruments with appropriate detector arrays and sensitivities. The study of these types of isotopic ordering reactions in nature is often called "clumped-isotope" geochemistry.

== See also ==
- Geologic temperature record
- Thermal history of Earth
- Timeline of glaciation
- List of periods and events in climate history
- Radiative forcing
- Paleoecology
- Paleoceanography
- Paleoclimatology
- Proxy
