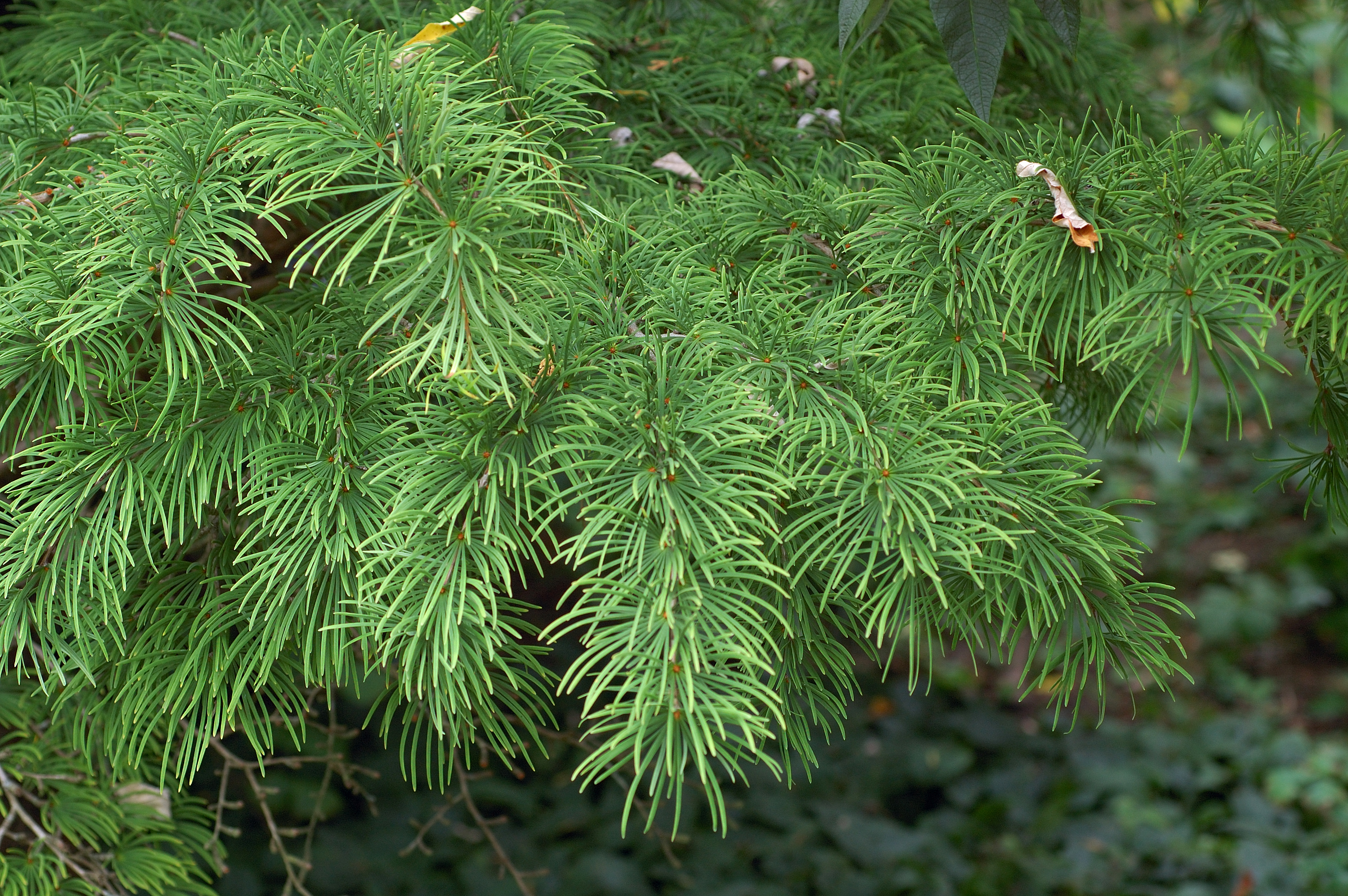

Conservation status
- Vulnerable (IUCN 3.1)

Scientific classification
- Kingdom: Plantae
- Clade: Tracheophytes
- Clade: Gymnosperms
- Division: Pinophyta
- Class: Pinopsida
- Order: Pinales
- Family: Pinaceae
- Subfamily: Abietoideae
- Genus: Pseudolarix
- Species: P. amabilis

Binomial name
- Pseudolarix amabilis (N. Nelson) Rehder

Synonyms
- †Pseudolarix arnoldii Gooch; Pseudolarix fortunei Mayr; Pseudolarix kaempferi Gordon; Pseudolarix pourtetii Ferré

= Pseudolarix amabilis =

Pseudolarix amabilis Temporal range: 49–0 Ma Early Eocene to recent

Species of coniferous tree

Pseudolarix amabilis is a species of coniferous tree in the pine family Pinaceae. The species is commonly known as golden larch, but being more closely related to Keteleeria, Abies and Cedrus, is not a true larch (Larix). P. amabilis is native to eastern China, occurring in small areas in the mountains of southern Anhui, Zhejiang, Fujian, Jiangxi, Hunan, Hubei and eastern Sichuan, at altitudes of 100–1,500 m (328–4,921 ft). The earliest known occurrences are of compression fossils found in the Ypresian Allenby Formation and mummified fossils found in the Late Eocene Buchanan Lake Formation on Axel Heiberg Island.

== Growth ==
It is a deciduous coniferous tree reaching 30–40 m (98–131 ft) tall, with a broad conic crown. The shoots are dimorphic, with long shoots and short shoots similar to a larch, though the short shoots are not so markedly short, lengthening about 5 mm annually. The leaves are bright green, 3–6 cm long and 2–3 mm broad, with two glaucous stomatal bands on the underside; they turn a brilliant golden yellow before falling in the autumn, hence the common name "golden larch". The leaves are arranged spirally, widely spaced on long shoots, and in a dense whorl on the short shoots.

The cones are distinctive, superficially resembling small globe artichokes, 4–7 cm long and 4–6 cm broad, with pointed triangular scales; they mature about 7 months after pollination, when (like fir and cedar cones) they disintegrate to release the winged seeds. The male cones, as in Keteleeria, are produced in umbels of several together in one bud.

== Characteristics ==
The golden larch is an attractive ornamental tree for parks and large gardens. Unlike the true larches, it is tolerant of summer heat and humidity, growing successfully in the southeastern United States where most larches and firs do not succeed. In Europe growth is most successful in the Mediterranean region with notable specimens in northern Italy; further north in the United Kingdom it will grow, but only very slowly due to the cooler summers.

This plant has gained the Royal Horticultural Society's Award of Garden Merit.

== Gallery ==
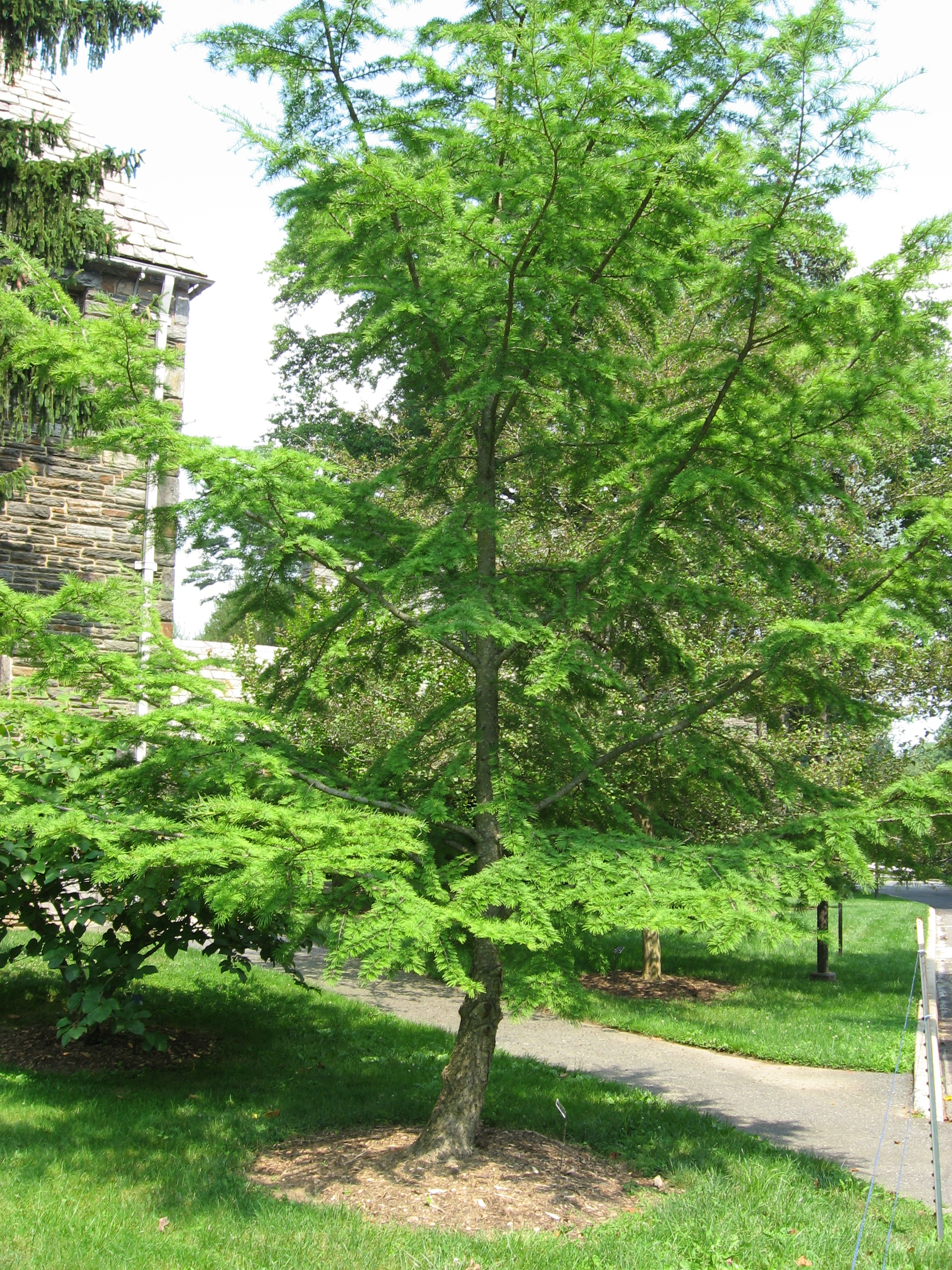

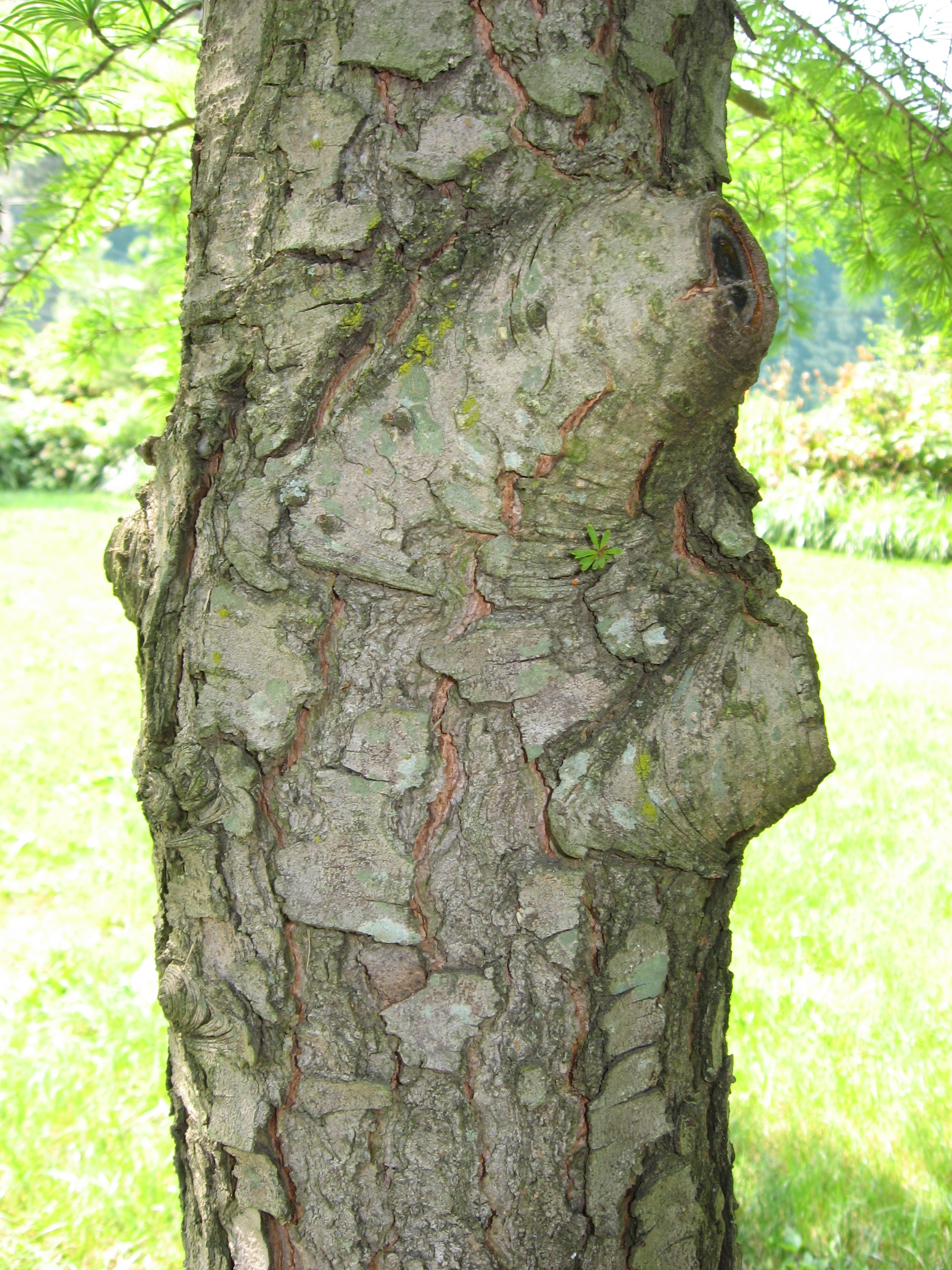
Closeup of bark

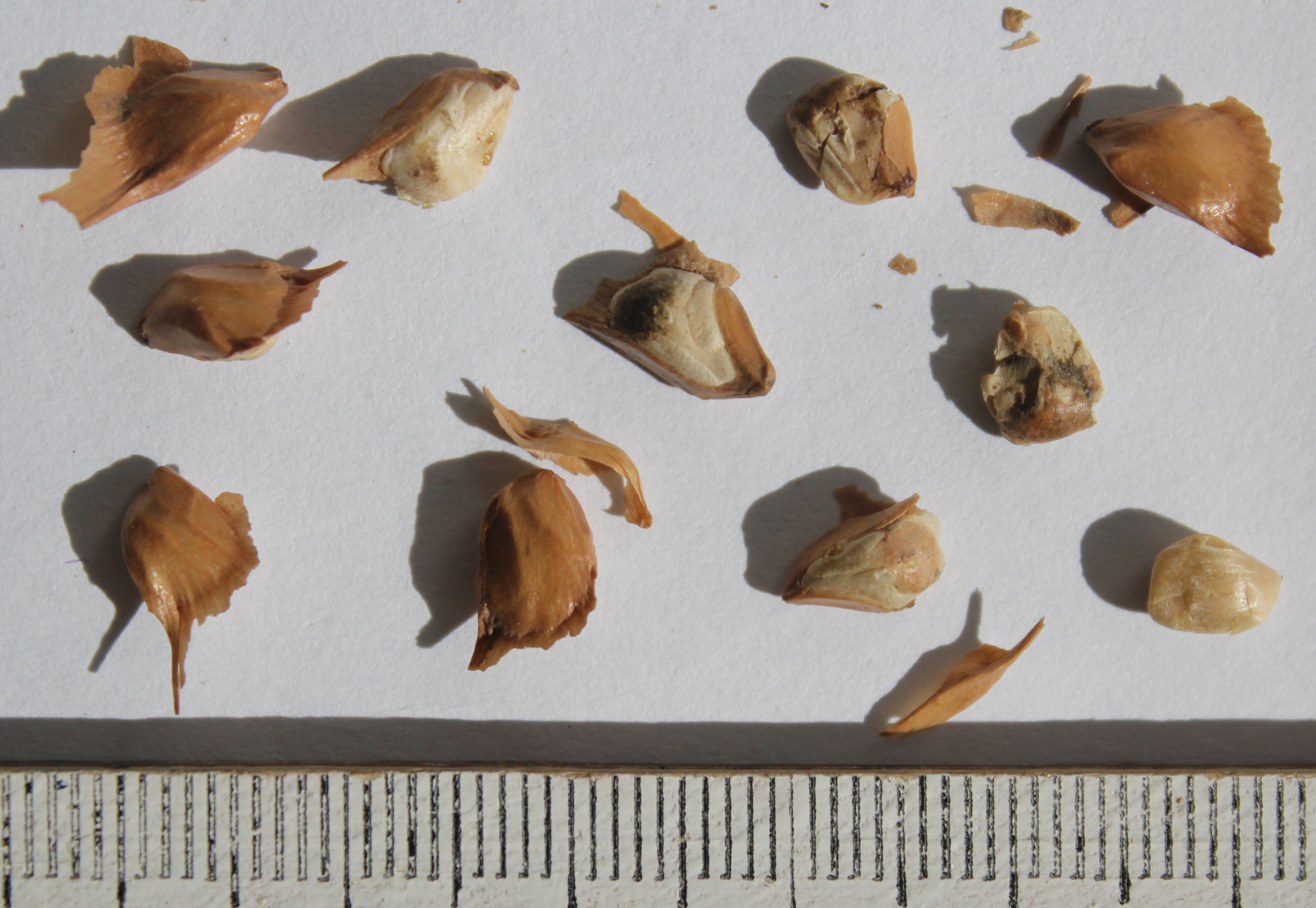
Seeds without wings

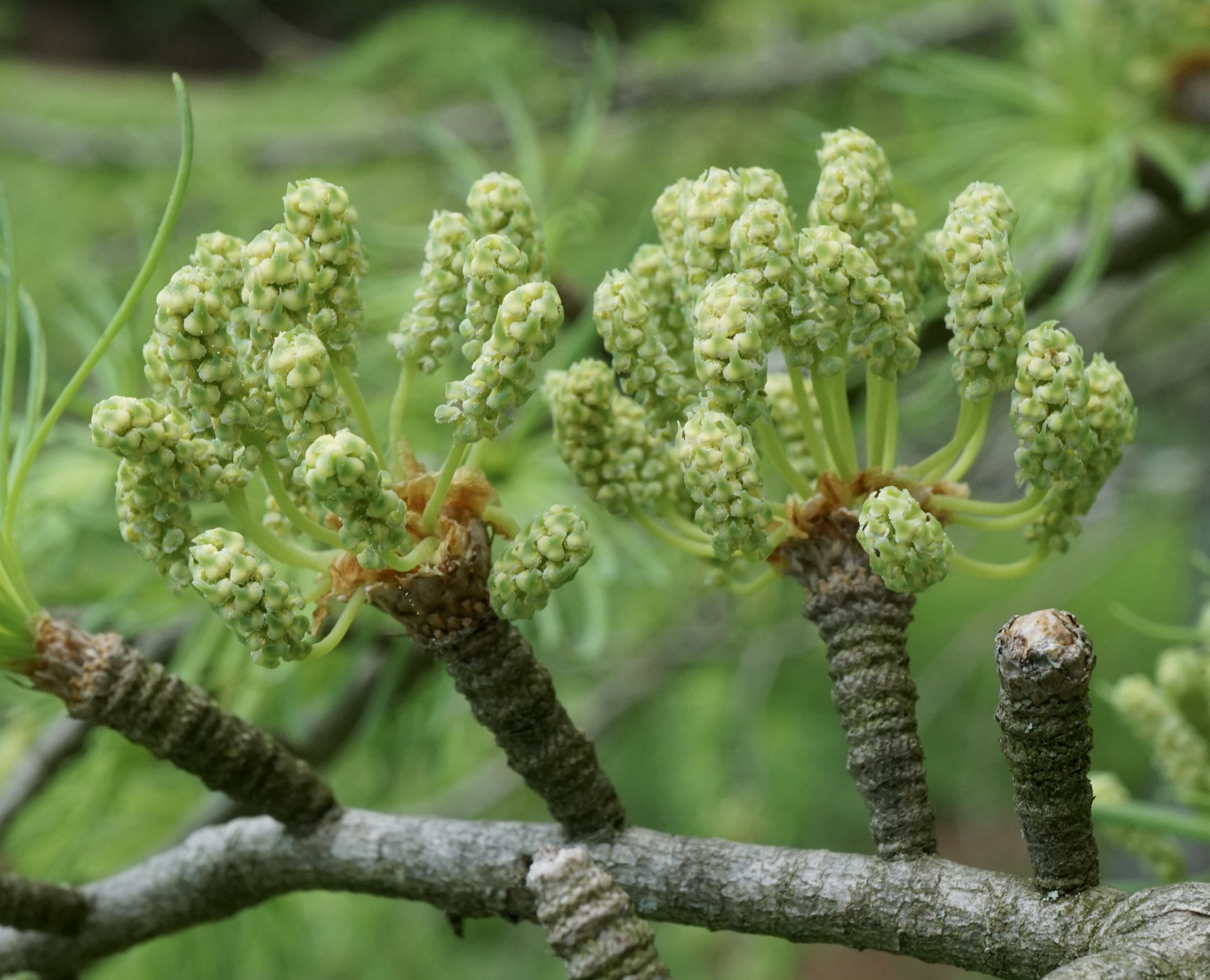
Pollen cones

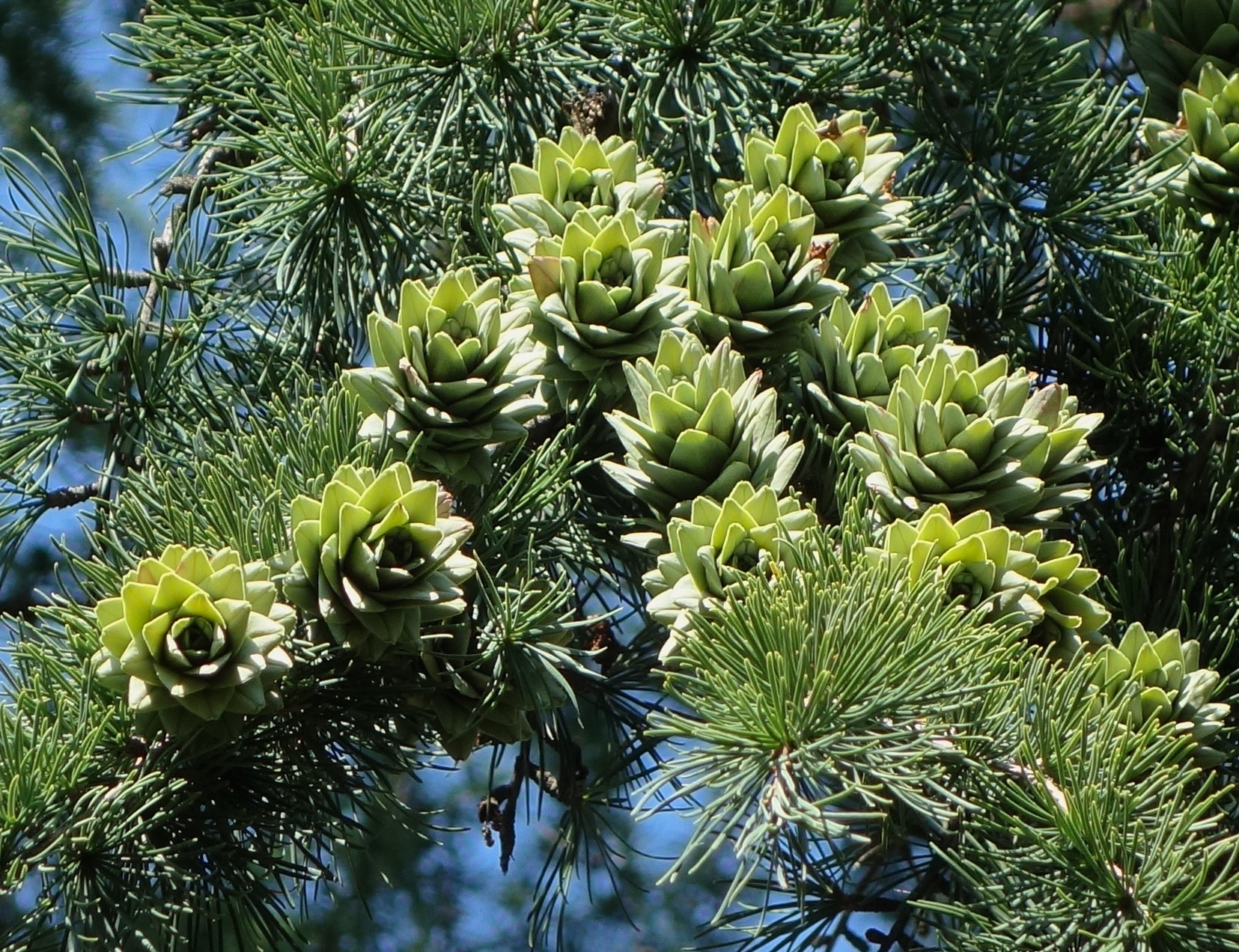
Maturing female cones

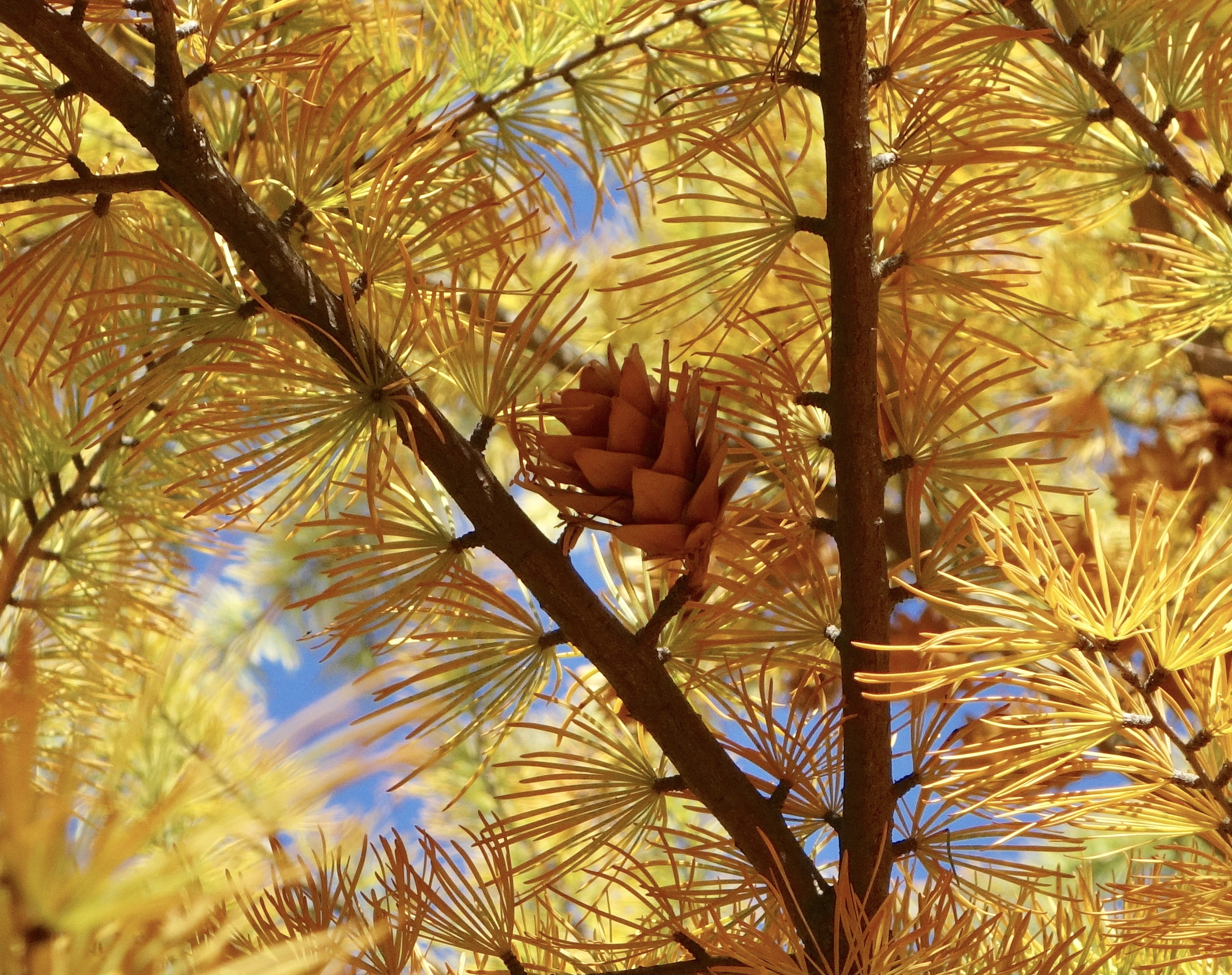
Needles and mature cone in fall

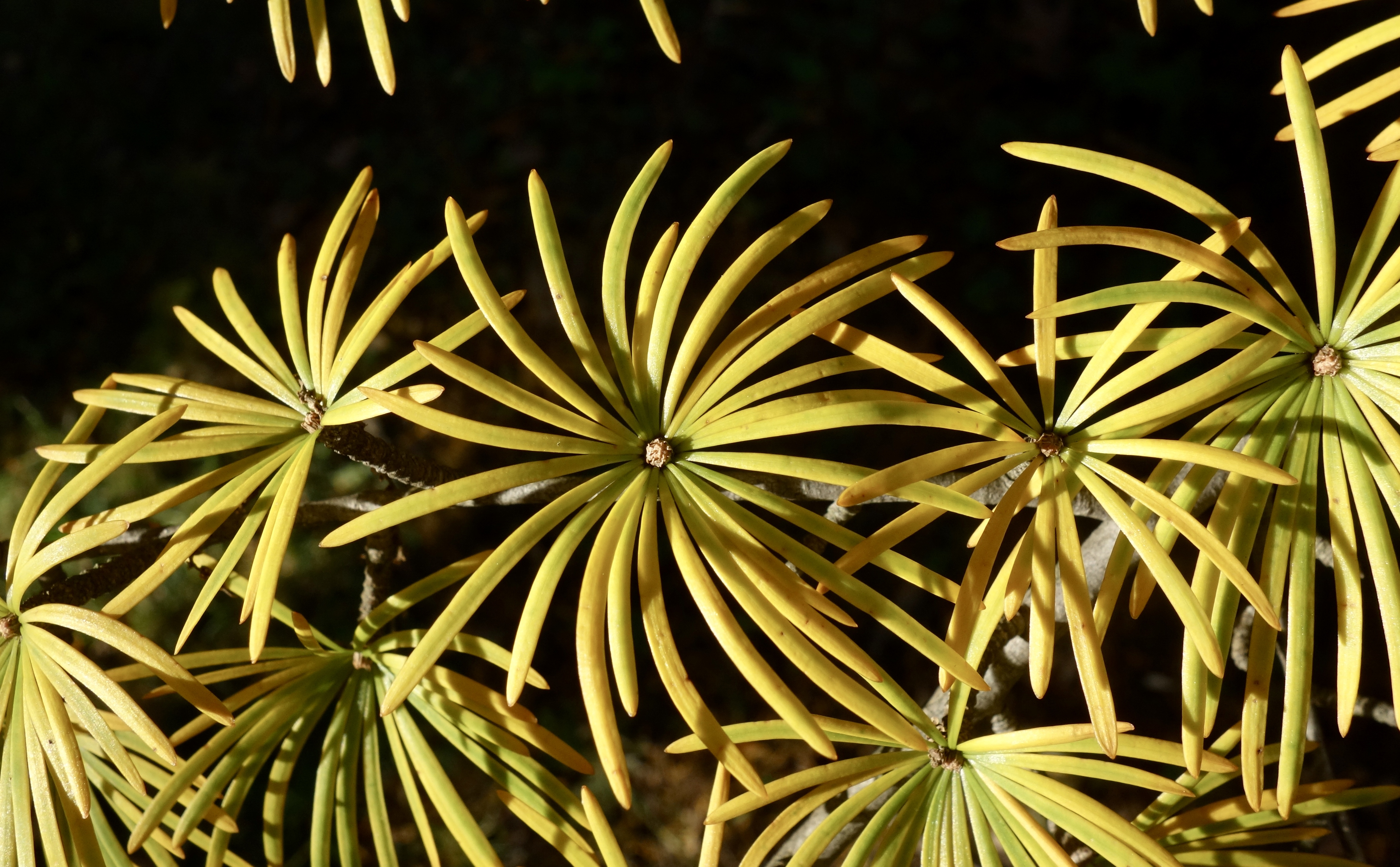
Needle detail in fall

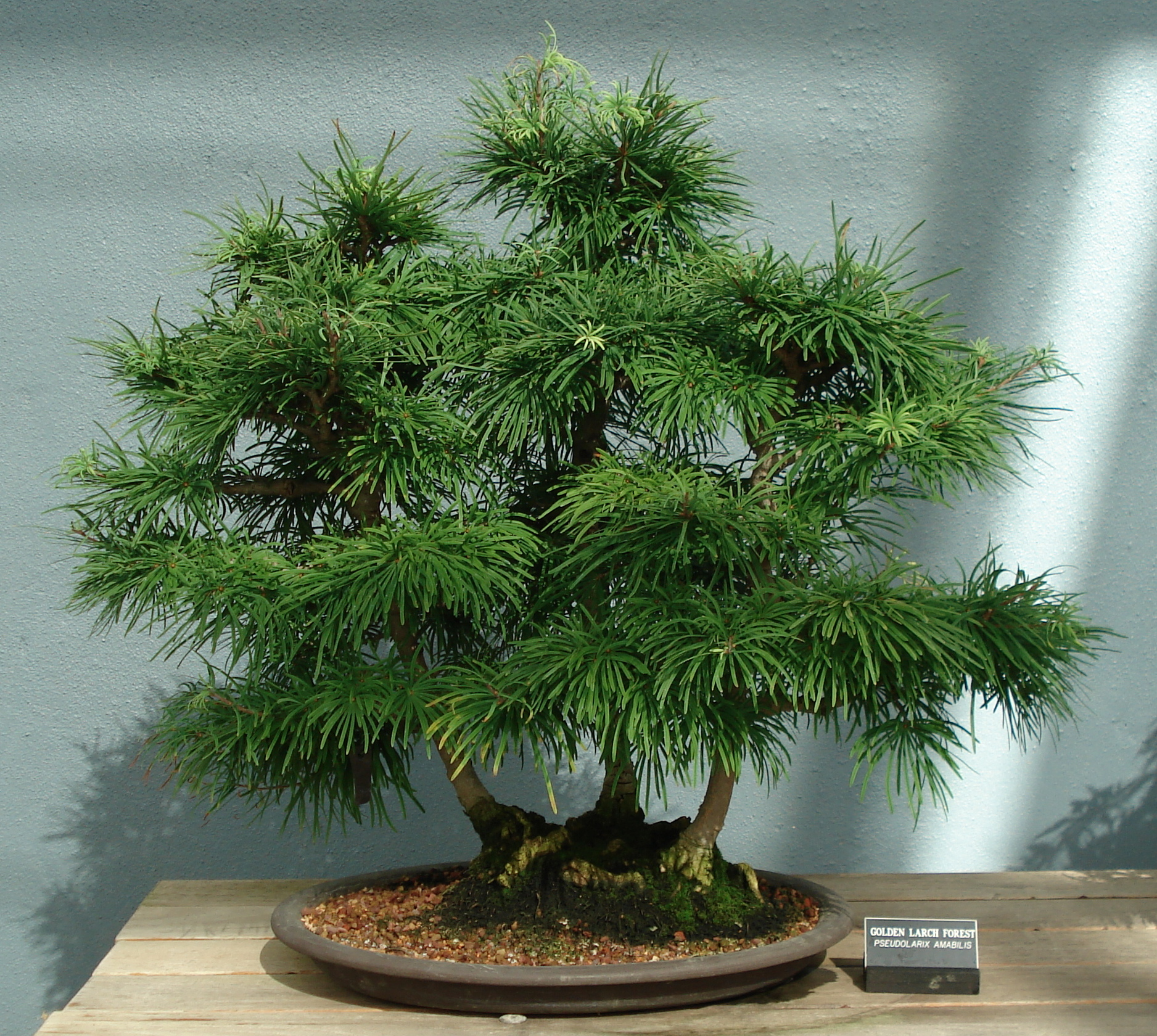
Bonsai example
