= Mesothermal =

Type of climate

In climatology, the term mesothermal is used to refer to certain forms of climate found typically in the Earth's temperate zones. It has a moderate span of temperature, with winters not cold enough to sustain snow cover. Summers are warm within oceanic climate regimes, and hot within continental or subtropical climate regimes.

== Origin of term ==
The term is derived from two Greek words meaning "having a moderate amount of heat." This can be misinterpreted, however, since the term is actually intended to describe only the temperature conditions that prevail during the winter months, rather than those for the year as a whole.

== Definition ==
Under the original Köppen climate classification, all places with an average temperature in their coldest month that is colder than 18 °C (64 °F), but warmer than −3 °C (27 °F), are said to have a mesothermal climate. The isotherm of −3 °C (27 °F) for the coldest monthly mean temperature, was observed to be the line where the climate was likely cold enough to support a fixed period of continuous snow cover every year.

In some climate classifications the isotherm of 0°C (32°F) for the coldest monthly mean temperature is observed as the line between mesothermal climates and microthermal climates where the coldest month has a mean temperature below −3 °C (27 °F).

== Range ==
In the US, the northern boundary line between mesothermal and microthermal ranges is north of Juneau and Sitka along the margins of the Pacific Ocean. It then goes southeastward around about 42N latitude across the north-central US (not including mountain regions) then eastward across the lower Midwest to the East Coast near Boston. The southern boundary line between mesothermal and megathermal (or tropical) is across south Florida just above Palm Beach.

== Moisture ==
In addition to being subdivisible by summer temperature, mesothermal climates can also be subclassified on the basis of precipitation — into humid, seasonal, semiarid and arid subtypes.

== See also ==
- Mesothermal valley
- Megathermal
- Microthermal
- Temperate climates
