= Microthermal =

In climatology, the term microthermal is used to denote the continental climates of Eurasia and North America.

== Etymology ==
The word microthermal is derived from two Greek words meaning "small" and "heat". This is misleading, however, since the term is intended to describe only the temperature conditions that prevail during the winter months, rather than those of the entire year.

== Characteristics ==
Under the original Köppen climate classification, all places with an average temperature in their coldest month that is colder than -3 °C (26,4 F), are said to have a microthermal climate. The isotherm of -3 °C for the coldest monthly mean temperature, was observed to be the line where the climate was likely cold enough to support a fixed period of continuous snow cover every year. In recent usage, an isotherm of 0°C (32°F) is commonly used instead. Either definition places almost all of the world's microthermal climates in the Northern Hemisphere, as the absence of broad land masses at upper-middle latitudes in the Southern Hemisphere precludes, with few exceptions, the existence of such temperature conditions there due to the sea moderating temperatures.

Microthermal climates are typically subdivided into three categories based on the temperature characteristics of the summer season. The southernmost of the three is frequently referred to as the temperate continental climate, and has hot summers — that is to say, at least one month has an average temperature of 22 °C (71.6 °F) or above. The middle zone is often labelled hemiboreal, and no summer month there has an average temperature as warm as 22 °C, but at least four months will still average at 10 °C (50 °F) or higher. The northernmost of the three microthermal zones is the subarctic, or boreal zone; there only one to three months will have average temperatures above 10 °C, bordering polar regions.

== Boundaries ==
In North America, microthermal climates start north of Boston along the Atlantic seaboard then westward to just below the Great Lakes to the Midwest, the line then moves southward below the Dakotas, through the west near 40 latitude at the eastern edge of the Rocky Mountains, then curving northward near the lowlands of the Pacific coast, reaching the Pacific Ocean just south of Juneau, Alaska. In Asia, the latitude at which these climates begin is several degrees farther south influence of the vast Siberian anticyclone, or high-pressure system, and in continental Europe the line actually runs longitudinally rather than latitudinally, cutting through central Poland after beginning north of the Arctic Circle along the Norwegian coast, thereafter moving diagonally across Scandinavia.

The boundary between the microthermal and polar climate zones is farthest north in western Europe (actually within the Arctic Circle there), and farthest south near the northeast coast of Canada (at about 56° North latitude on the central coast of Labrador); it then trends northward across Canada before dropping south again as it courses through Alaska. Throughout most of Siberia, the boundary tends to follow the Arctic Circle fairly closely.

In addition to having various summer temperature regimes, microthermal climates also differ from one another in how much precipitation they receive — such climates may be humid, semiarid or arid. Most of the Turkestan-Gobi desert system has an arid microthermal climate, while the best-known example of the semiarid microthermal climate can be found in the "steppes of Central Asia" immortalized by Russian classical music composer Alexander Borodin.

== Sources ==
Unasylva - Vol.9, No. 2 - Climatic classification in forestry

== See also ==
- Megathermal
- Mesothermal
- Humid continental
- Subarctic
