= V. Standish Mallory =

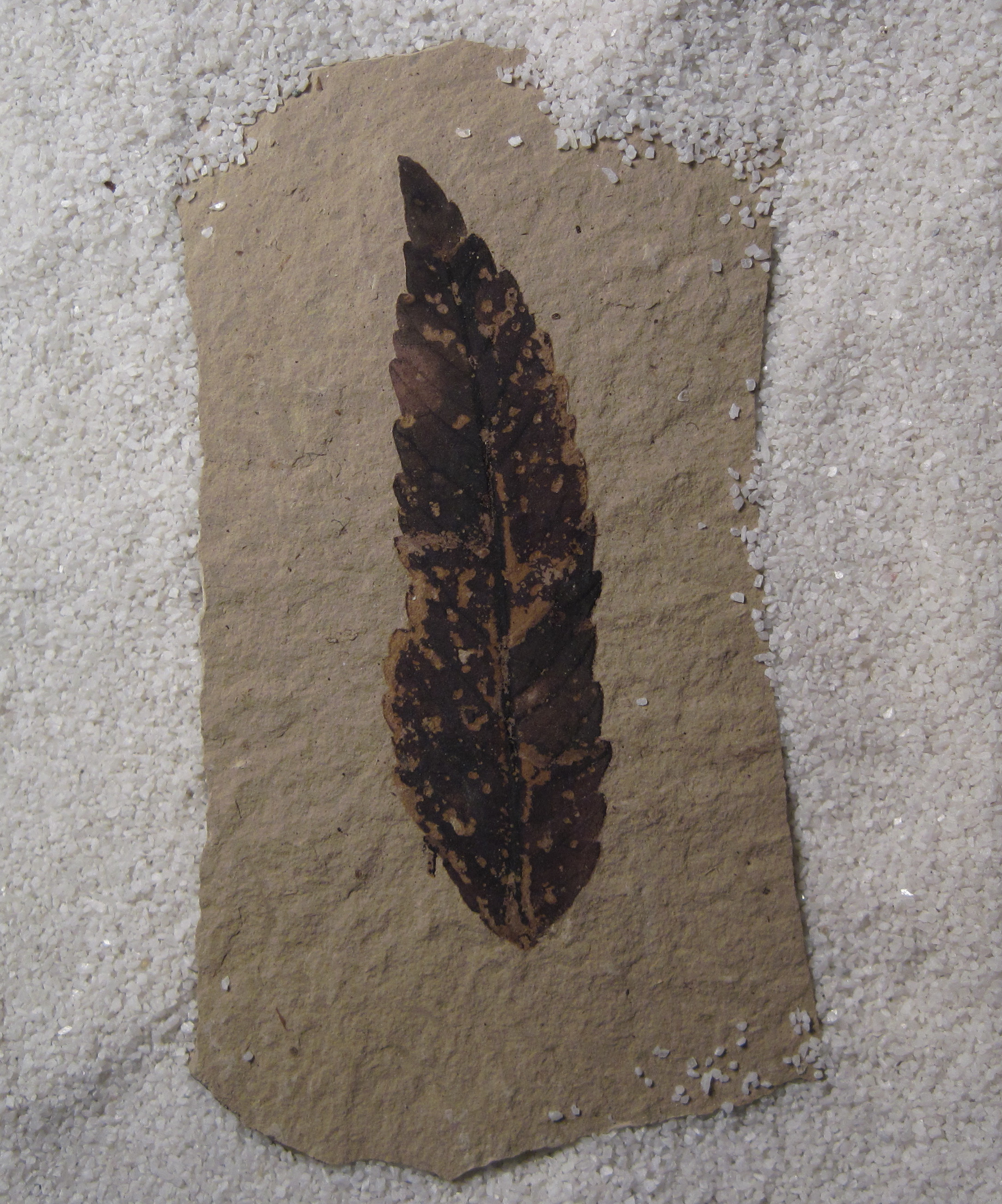
Rhus malloryi leaflet from the Klondike Mountain Formation, named in honor of V. Standish Mallory

Victor Standish Mallory (1919 in Englewood, New Jersey – February 15, 2003) was a micropaleontologist, biostratigrapher, Professor Emeritus at the University of Washington Department of Geology, and a Curator Emeritus of Invertebrate Paleontology at the Burke Museum of Natural History and Culture.

Mallory earned his BS in Geology from Oberlin College and his Masters and Ph. D. studying under Robert Kleinpell at the University of California, Berkeley. He was an expert in the Tertiary of Washington State and specialized in biostratigraphy using Foraminifera. A number of paleontological species from Eastern Washington and Oregon have the specific epithet "malloryi" in honor of his expertise in the stratigraphy and paleontology of the area, including the Miocence chipmunk, Neotamias malloryi plus the Ypresian sumac Rhus malloryi and winter-hazel Fothergilla malloryi.

V. Standish Mallory

== See also ==
- List of paleontologists
