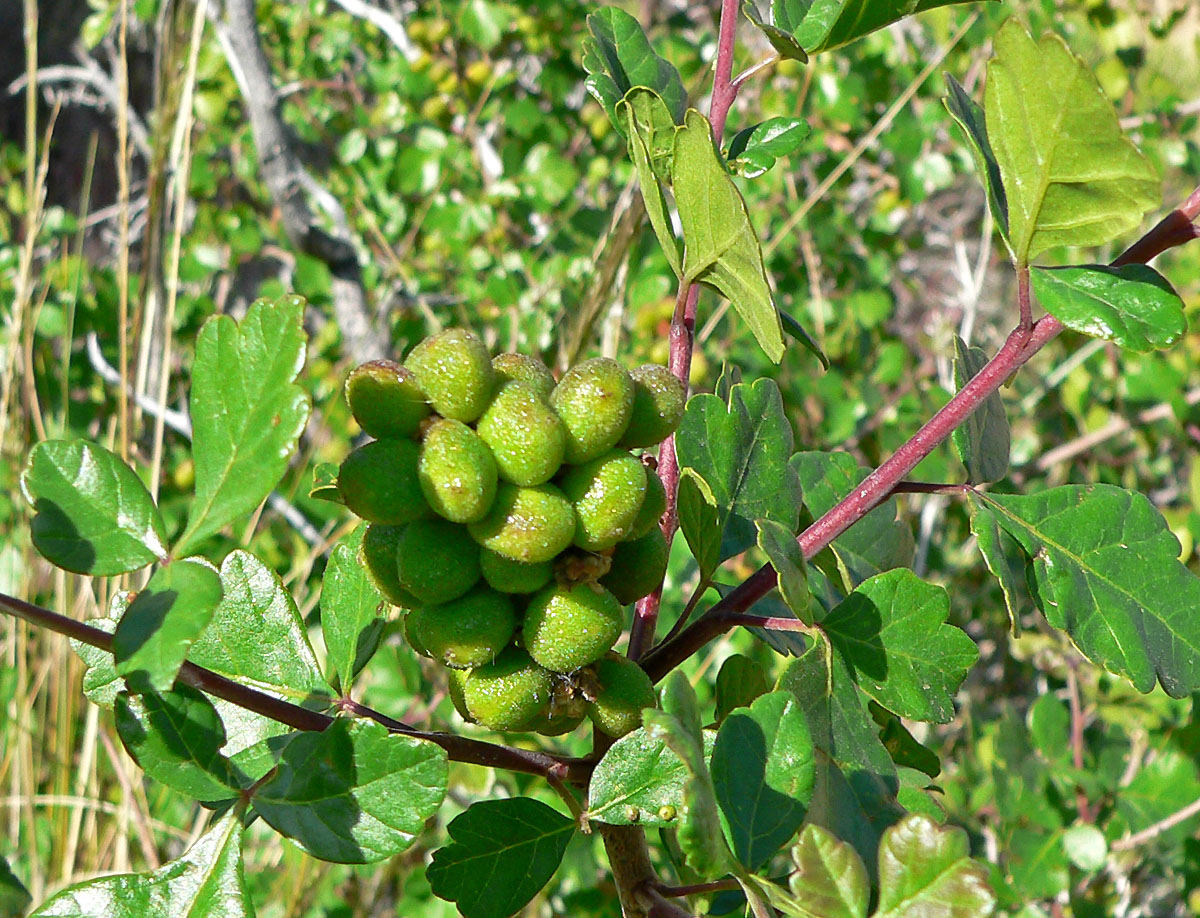
- Green berries

Conservation status
- Secure (NatureServe)

Scientific classification
- Kingdom: Plantae
- Clade: Tracheophytes
- Clade: Angiosperms
- Clade: Eudicots
- Clade: Rosids
- Order: Sapindales
- Family: Anacardiaceae
- Genus: Rhus
- Species: R. trilobata

Binomial name
- Rhus trilobata Nutt.

= Rhus trilobata =

Species of shrub

Rhus trilobata is a North American shrub in the sumac genus (Rhus) with the common names skunkbush sumac, sourberry, skunkbush, and three-leaf sumac.

== Description ==
The twigs are fuzzy when new, and turn sleek with age. The leaves are up to 1.5 centimetres (1/2 in) long and produce a very strong odour when crushed. The aroma is bitter and often disagreeable (earning the plant the name skunkbush). The leaves are green when new and turn orange and brown in the fall.

The flowers, borne on small catkins ("short shoots"), are yellowish-green and pollinated by animals. The plant yields hairy and slightly sticky reddish-orange berries which have an aroma similar to limes and a very sour taste. The acidity comes from tannic and gallic acids. The seeds are dispersed by animals that eat the berries. The shrub also reproduces vegetatively, sending up sprouts several meters away and forming thickets.

=== Similar species ===
Rhus trilobata closely resembles other members of the genus that have leaves with three "leaflets" ("trifoliate" leaves). These include Rhus aromatica, native to eastern North America, and western poison-oak. The shape of the leaflets and the habit of the shrub make this species, like some other Rhus, resemble small-leafed oaks (Quercus).

Toxicodendron diversilobum lacks the foul odour and has white berries.

== Distribution and habitat ==
The species is native to the western half of Canada and the Western United States, from the Great Plains to California and south through Arizona extending into northern Mexico. It can be found from deserts to mountain peaks up to about 2,100 metres (7,000 ft) in elevation.

It grows in many types of plant communities, such as the grasslands east of the Rocky Mountains, mountainous shrubland, pine, juniper, and fir forests, wetlands, oak woodlands, and chaparral. The plant is destroyed above ground but rarely killed by wildfire, and will readily sprout back up in burned areas.

== Uses ==
The berries are an important food source in winter for many birds and some small mammals.

The skunkbush sumac has historically been used for medicinal and other purposes. The bark has been chewed or brewed into a drink for cold symptoms, the berries eaten for gastrointestinal complaints and toothache, and the leaves and roots boiled and eaten for many complaints. The leaves have also been smoked. The flexible branches were useful and sought after for twisting into basketry and rugs. The berries, although sour, are edible. They can be baked into bread or mixed into porridge or soup. Steeped, they can make a tea or tart beverage similar to lemonade. The fruit can also be eaten directly, although a bit of salt may improve the flavor. According to Marvin Johnson Jr, a Mono native from Cold Springs Rancheria (a federally recognized tribe from Tollhouse, California), the fruit will last all year long if you have flats full and dry them out. He goes on to say, once you're ready to eat them, just add a little moisture.

It is sometimes planted for erosion control and landscaping, and is a plant used for reclaiming barren land stripped by mining.

The Zuni people, Navajo, Mono tribe of California, and other tribes in the area use the stems with the bark removed to make baskets.

The Uncompahgre Ute name for the berries is mah wup, and the bush is called ece.
