= Rhus republicensis =

Rhus republicensis Temporal range: Ypresian

Scientific classification
- Kingdom: Plantae
- Clade: Tracheophytes
- Clade: Angiosperms
- Clade: Eudicots
- Clade: Rosids
- Order: Sapindales
- Family: Anacardiaceae
- Genus: Rhus
- Species: †R. republicensis

Binomial name
- †Rhus republicensis Flynn, DeVore, & Pigg, 2019

Extinct sumac species

Rhus republicensis is an extinct species of flowering plant in the sumac family, Anacardiaceae. The species is known from fossil leaves found in the early Eocene deposits of northern Washington state in the United States. The species was first described from fossil leaves found in the Klondike Mountain Formation. R. republicensis likely hybridized with the other Klondike Mountain formation sumac species Rhus boothillensis, Rhus garwellii, and Rhus malloryi.

== Distribution and paleoenvironment ==
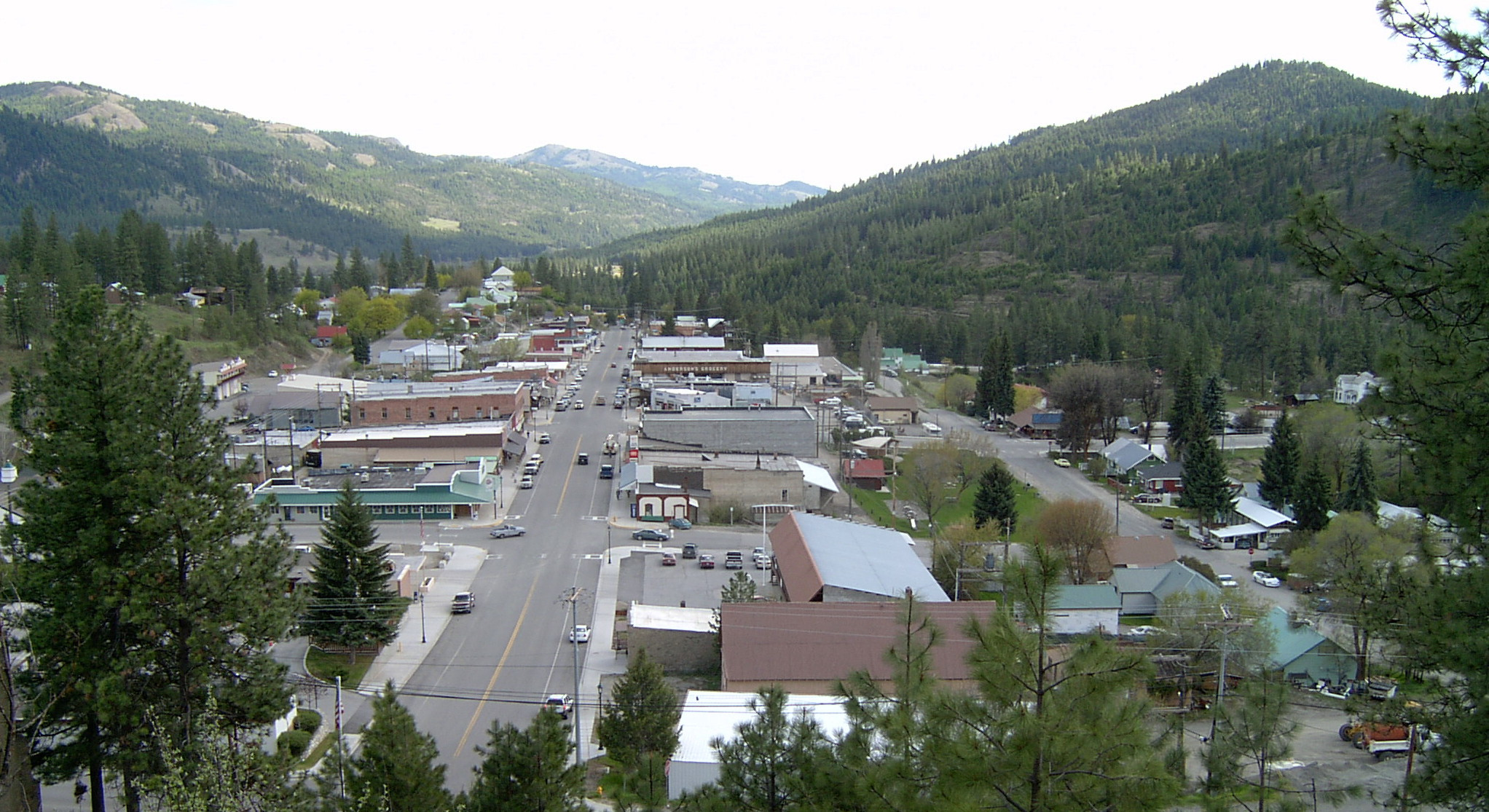
Republic, Washington, origin of the species name.

Rhus republicensis is known from specimens which are recovered from an outcrop of the early Eocene, Ypresian Klondike Mountain Formation in Republic. The Klondike Mountain Formation preserves an upland temperate flora which was first interpreted as being microthermal, however further study has shown the flora to be more mesothermal in nature. The plant community preserved in the Klondike Mountain formation is a mixed conifer–broadleaf forest with large pollen elements of birch and golden larch, but also having notable traces of fir, spruce, cypress, and palm.

== Taxonomy ==
The species was described from a type specimen, the holotype leaf, number SR 10-29-20 A&B, plus a pair paratype specimens, SR 92-05-05 and SR 97-03-15 A&B. The type series specimens are currently preserved in the paleobotanical collections of the Stonerose Interpretive Center in Republic, Washington. The specimens were studied by paleobotanists Soon Flynn and Kathleen Pigg of Arizona State University with Melanie DeVore of Georgia College and State University. They published their 2019 type description for R. republicensis in the International Journal of Plant Sciences. The etymology of the chosen specific name republicensis is a reference to Republic, Washington where the collecting site is located. In addition to Rhus republicensis Flynn et al also provided descriptions of the coeval species Rhus boothillensis and Rhus garwellii and gave a redescription of Rhus malloryi in the 2019 paper. They noted that the Klondike Mountain Formation preserves a number of Rhus specimens which appear to be hybrids of the named species.

== Description ==
Rhus republicensis leaves are pinnately compound on a 16.5 cm (6.5 in) long petiole, with a possible total length of 20 cm (7.9 in)for full leaves. The subopposite leaflets are sessile on the 10.5 cm (4.1 in) rachis between the flared wings that bracket the 1.1 mm (0.043 in) midvein. The 1.8–5.7 cm (0.71–2.24 in) leaflets are obovoid to ovoid in outline, tapering from the wide middle to both the base and apex. They have a width of 0.7–2.5 cm (0.28–0.98 in) and a length to width ratio of up to 3.1:1. The midveins of the leaflets are narrow and pass all the way to the leaflet apex, with smaller secondary veins branching off the midvein at acute angles. The narrow secondaries are spaced on the midvein unevenly and group closer together near the leaflet tip, while usually branching once near the leaflet margin. The branches of the secondaries enter a tooth or the sinus between two teeth. The teeth are rounded on their tips with convex basal and apical sides running towards variable sinuses. The teeth become more developed and closer spaced towards the tip of the leaflet. The leafy wings of the rachis have secondary veins that angle steeply towards the leaf tip and occasionally forking.
