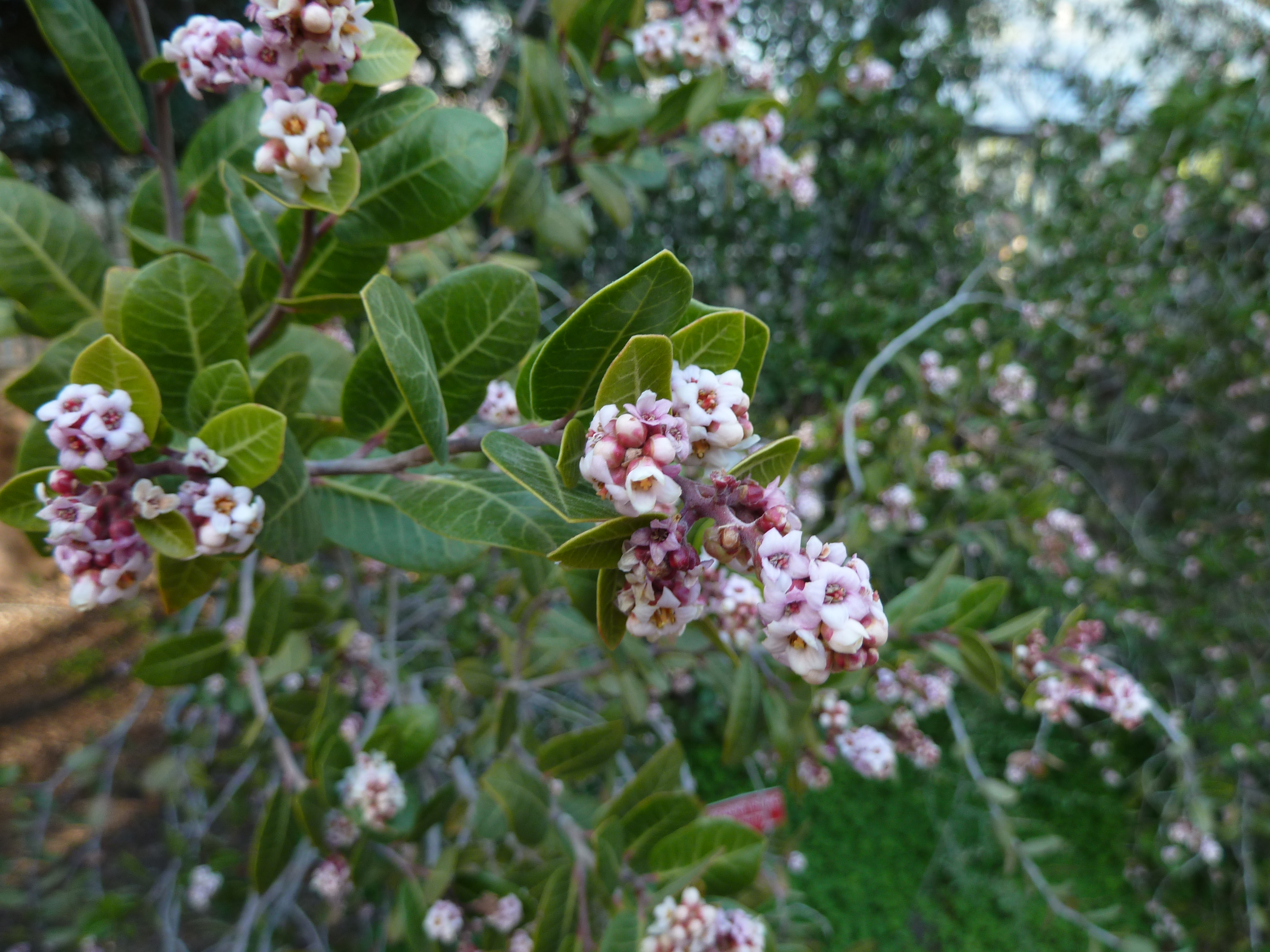

Conservation status
- Apparently Secure (NatureServe)

Scientific classification
- Kingdom: Plantae
- Clade: Tracheophytes
- Clade: Angiosperms
- Clade: Eudicots
- Clade: Rosids
- Order: Sapindales
- Family: Anacardiaceae
- Genus: Rhus
- Species: R. kearneyi

Binomial name
- Rhus kearneyi F.A.Barkley
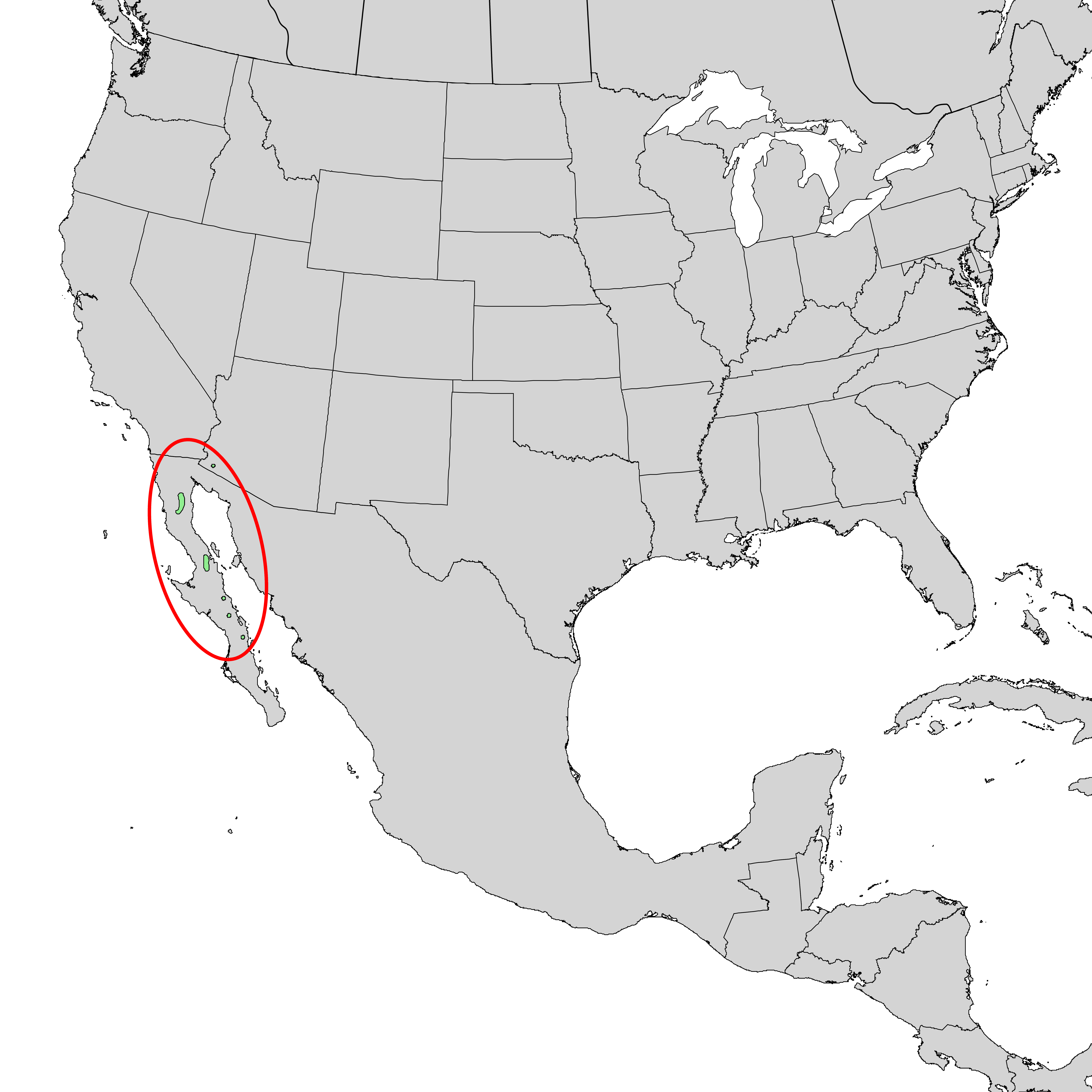
- Natural range of Rhus kearneyi

= Rhus kearneyi =

Species of flowering plant

Rhus kearneyi is a species of flowering plant in the cashew family known by the common name Kearney's sumac. It is native to western North America, where it can be found in Arizona in the United States and Baja California in Mexico.

This species is a shrub or small tree up to 4 meters tall. The twigs and petioles are red. The leaves are oval or oblong in shape, sometimes three-lobed or divided into three leaflets. They are leathery and a shiny green to a waxy bluish in color with white veining. The inflorescence contains many crowded cream or pink flowers. The fruit is about a centimeter long.

There are several subspecies of this plant. The ssp. kearneyi occurs in Yuma County, Arizona. There is only one population, which is located on the Barry Goldwater Bombing Range.

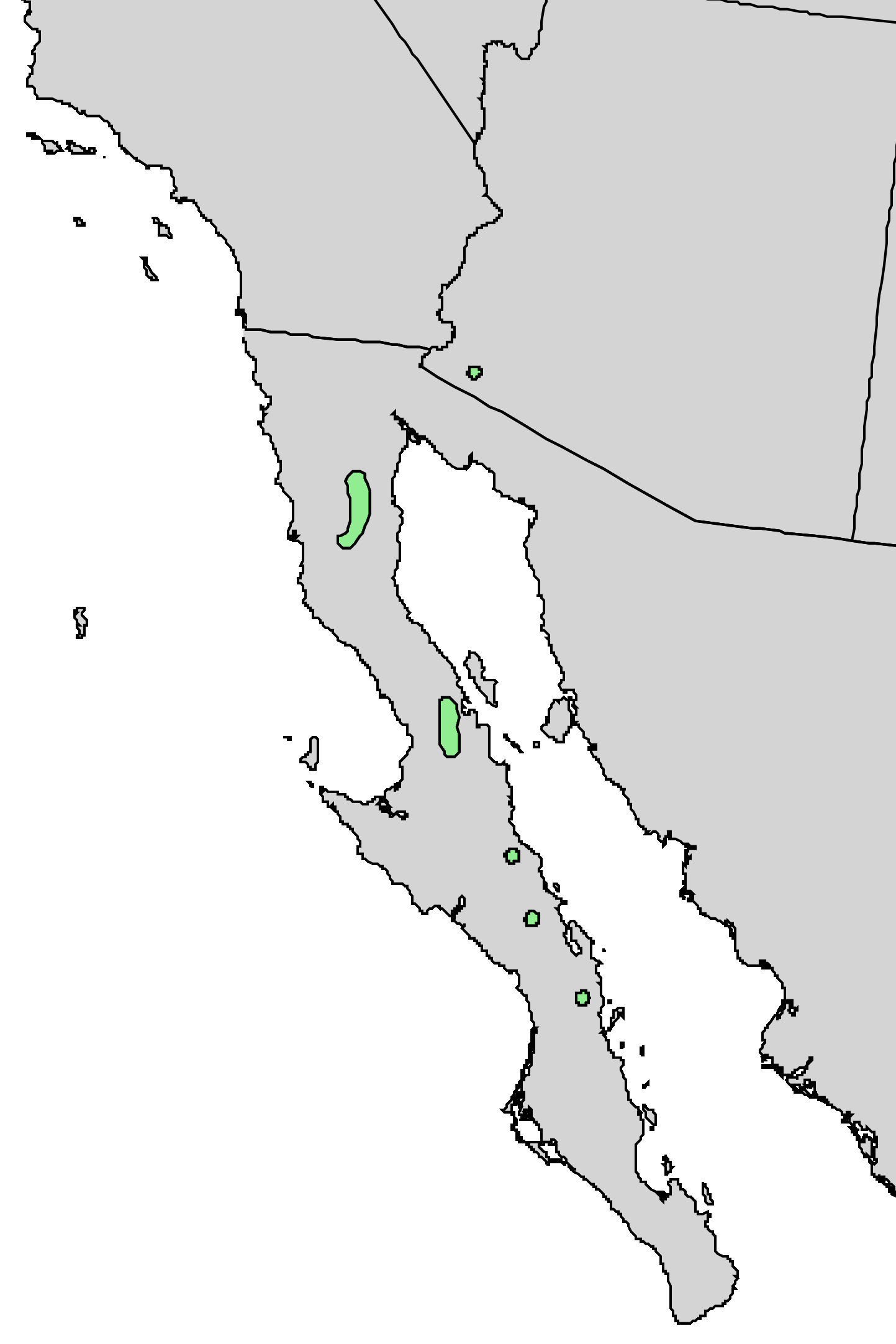
Natural range
