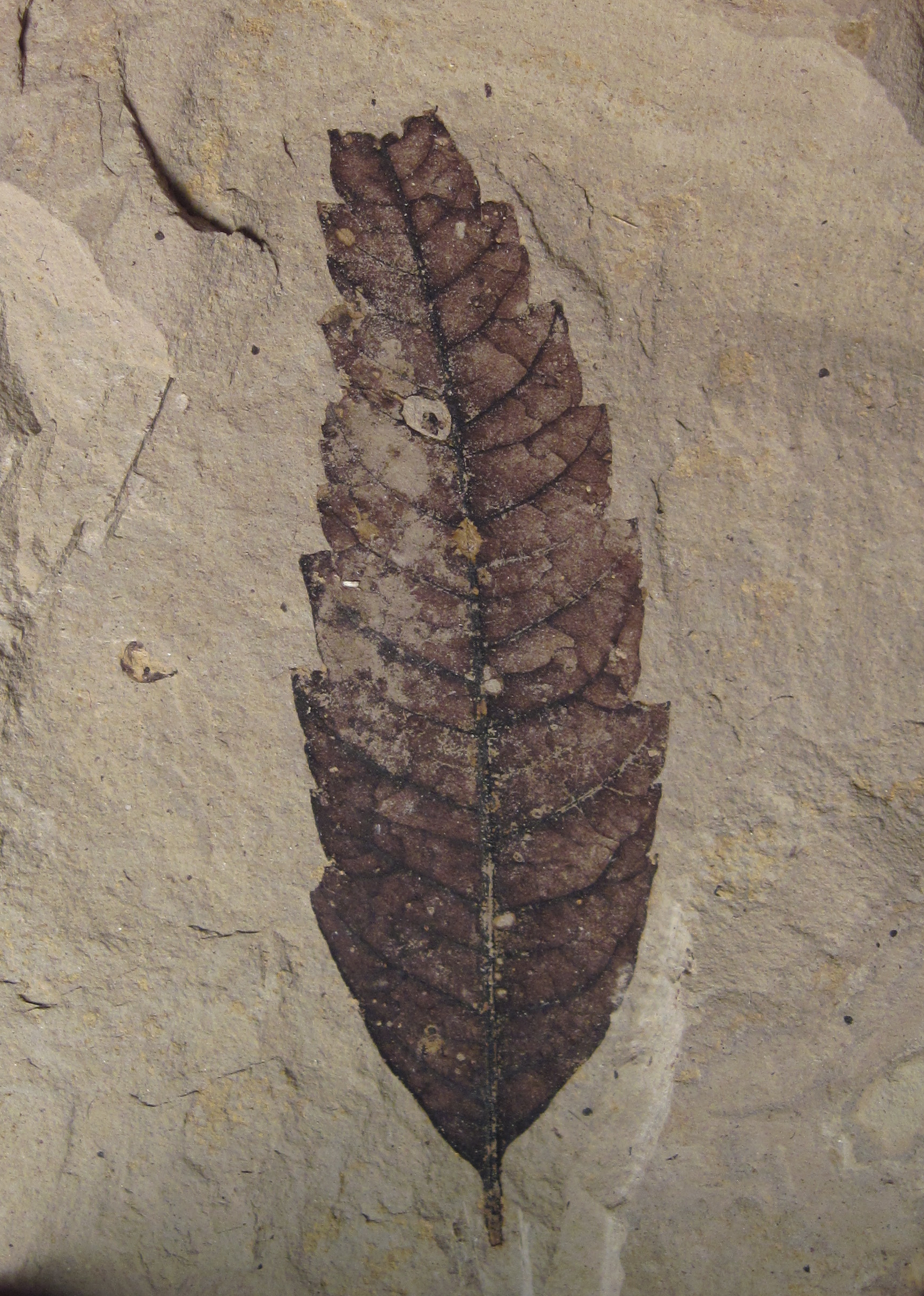
- R. garwellii leaf fossil

Scientific classification
- Kingdom: Plantae
- Clade: Tracheophytes
- Clade: Angiosperms
- Clade: Eudicots
- Clade: Rosids
- Order: Sapindales
- Family: Anacardiaceae
- Genus: Rhus
- Species: †R. garwellii

Binomial name
- †Rhus garwellii Flynn, DeVore, & Pigg, 2019

= Rhus garwellii =

Rhus garwellii Temporal range: Ypresian

Extinct species of flowering plant

Rhus garwellii is an extinct species of flowering plant in the sumac family Anacardiaceae. The species is known from fossil leaves found in the early Eocene deposits of northern Washington State, United States. The species was first described from fossil leaves found in the Klondike Mountain Formation. R. garwellii likely hybridized with the other Klondike Mountain formation sumac species R. boothillensis, R. malloryi, and R. republicensis.

== Distribution and paleoenvironment ==
Rhus garwellii is known from specimens which are recovered from an outcrop of the early Eocene, Ypresian Klondike Mountain Formation in Republic. The Klondike Mountain Formation preserves an upland temperate flora which was first interpreted as being microthermal, however further study has shown the flora to be more mesothermal in nature. The plant community preserved in the Klondike Mountain formation is a mixed conifer–broadleaf forest with large pollen elements of birch and golden larch, but also having notable traces of fir, spruce, cypress, and palm. Fossils of Rhus garwellii were described along with descriptions of the coeval species R. boothillensis and R. republicensis plus a redescription of R. malloryi.

== Taxonomy ==
The species was described from a type specimen, the holotype leaf, number SR 00-04-24, plus two paratype specimens SR 93-14-02 and SR 07-39-05 A & B. The type series specimens are currently preserved in the paleobotanical collections of the Stonerose Interpretive Center in Republic, Washington. The specimens were studied by paleobotanists Soon Flynn and Kathleen Pigg of Arizona State University with Melanie DeVore of Georgia College and State University. They published their 2019 type description for R. boothillensis in the International Journal of Plant Sciences. The etymology of the chosen specific name garwellii is a patronym honoring Gar Rothwell recognizing his excitement and dedication for paleobotany. In addition to Rhus garwellii Flynn et al also provided descriptions of the coeval species R. boothillensis and R. republicensis and a gave a redescription of R. malloryi in the 2019 paper. They noted that the Klondike Mountain Formation preserves a number of Rhus specimens which appear to be hybrids of the named species.

== Description ==
Full R. garwellii pinnately compound leaves are unknown, with the leaflets being found without a petiole or rachis having been found at the time of description. Unlike R. malloryi and R. republicensis which both have sessile leaflets, R. garwell and R. boothillensis leaflets have petiolules. The 8.5 cm (3.3 in) R. garwell leaflets are elliptical in outline, tapering from the wide middle to the symmetrical base and pointed apex. They have a width of 3.2–4.0 cm (1.3–1.6 in) and a length to width ratio of up to 2.6:1. The teeth along the margin have distinctly pointed tips with convex basal and apical sides running towards angular sinuses.

The midveins of the leaflets are thicker at the base and narrow from base to the leaflet apex, with smaller secondary veins branching off the midvein at acute angles. The secondaries are branch from the midvein subopposite to alternately, with frequent intersecondary veins between them that branch into tetiaries. The secondaries curved towards the leaflet edges, with a major fork between 40%–60% from the midvein. The secondary veins major branch terminate in a tooth, while the minor branch terminates in the sinus above or below a tooth. The tertiary veins are sinuous and connect to either the secondary veins or to the midvein.
