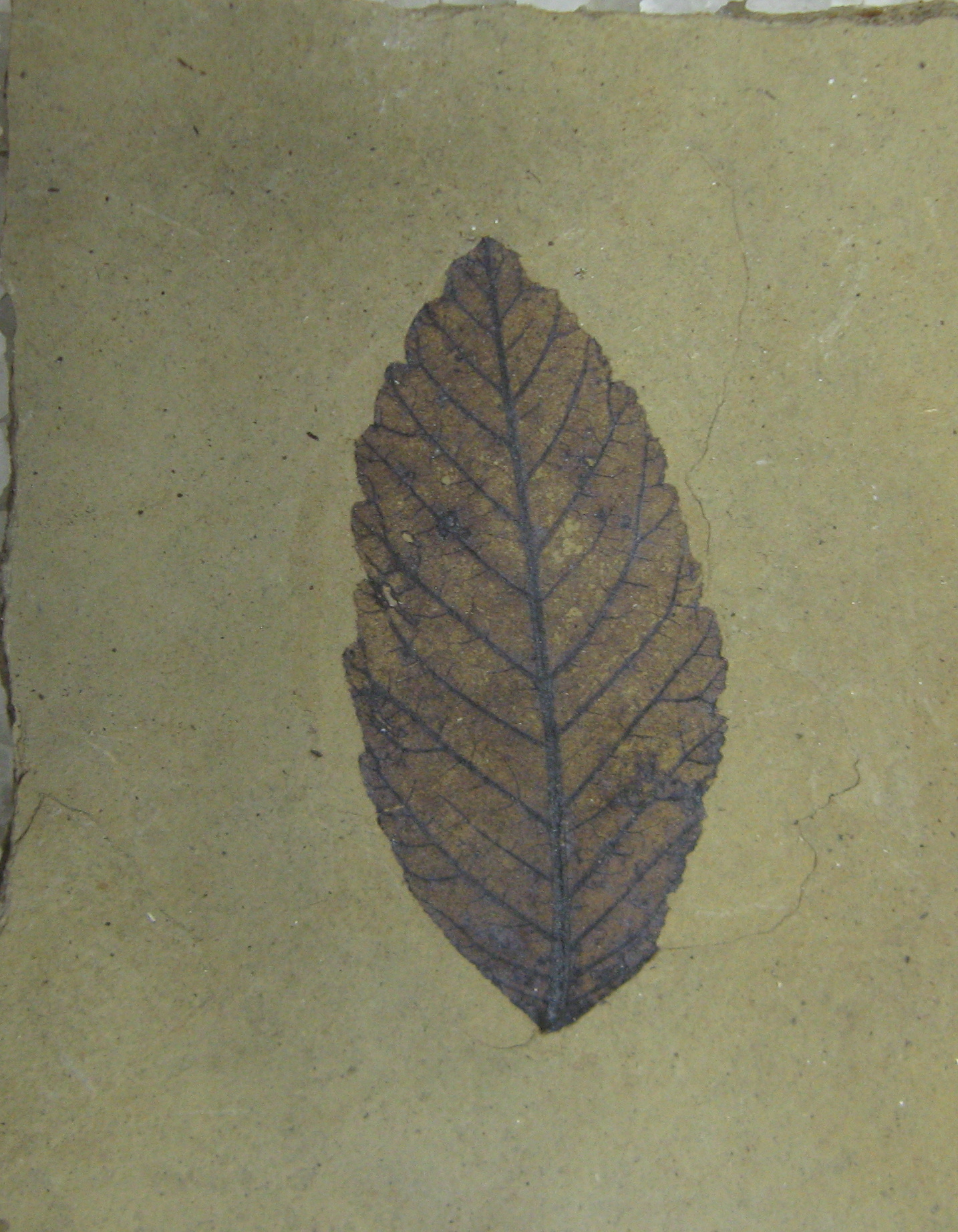
- Rhus bothillensis leaflet

Scientific classification
- Kingdom: Plantae
- Clade: Tracheophytes
- Clade: Angiosperms
- Clade: Eudicots
- Clade: Rosids
- Order: Sapindales
- Family: Anacardiaceae
- Genus: Rhus
- Species: †R. boothillensis

Binomial name
- †Rhus boothillensis Flynn, DeVore, & Pigg, 2019

= Rhus boothillensis =

Rhus boothillensis Temporal range: Ypresian

Extinct species of flowering plant

Rhus boothillensis is an extinct species of flowering plant in the sumac family Anacardiaceae. The species is known from fossil leaves found in the early Eocene deposits of northern Washington State, United States. The species was first described from fossil leaves found in the Klondike Mountain Formation. Rhus boothillensis likely hybridized with the other Klondike Mountain formation sumac species Rhus garwellii, Rhus malloryi, and Rhus republicensis.

== Distribution and paleoenvironment ==
Rhus boothillensis is known from specimens which are recovered from an outcrop of the early Eocene, Ypresian Klondike Mountain Formation in Republic. The Klondike Mountain Formation preserves an upland temperate flora which was first interpreted as being microthermal, however further study has shown the flora to be more mesothermal in nature. The plant community preserved in the Klondike Mountain formation is a mixed conifer–broadleaf forest with large pollen elements of birch and golden larch, but also having notable traces of fir, spruce, cypress, and palm.

== Taxonomy ==
The species was described from a type specimen, the holotype leaf, number SR 09-30-07, and a group of five paratype specimens. The type series specimens are currently preserved in the paleobotanical collections of the Stonerose Interpretive Center in Republic, Washington. The specimens were studied by paleobotanists Soon Flynn and Kathleen Pigg of Arizona State University with Melanie DeVore of Georgia College and State University. They published their 2019 type description for R. boothillensis in the International Journal of Plant Sciences. The etymology of the chosen specific name boothillensis is a reference to the "Boot Hill" dig site at which 30 years of public diggers have collected fossils. In addition to Rhus boothillensis Flynn et al also provided descriptions of the coeval species Rhus garwellii and Rhus republicensis and a gave a redescription of Rhus malloryi in the 2019 paper. They noted that the Klondike Mountain Formation preserves a number of Rhus specimens which appear to be hybrids of the named species.

== Description ==
R. boothillensis leaves are pinnately compound on an at least 26 cm (10 in) long petiole, with the full length of the rachis unknown. The subopposite leaflets attach to the rachis between 2–5 mm (0.079–0.197 in) wide wings that bracket the stems midvein. The leaflets have a 3 mm (0.12 in) petiolule unlike R. malloryi and R. republicensis which both have sessile leaflets. The 3.4–7.0 cm (1.3–2.8 in) leaflets are elliptical in outline, tapering from the wide middle to the asymmetrical base and pointed apex. They have a width of 1.2–2.7 cm (0.47–1.06 in) and a length to width ratio of up to 4.2:1.

The midveins of the leaflets are thicker at the base and narrow from base to the leaflet apex, with smaller secondary veins branching off the midvein at acute angles. The secondaries are branch from the midvein alternately and change to being subopposite near the leaflet tip, and run straight to slightly curved towards the leaflet edges. The secondary veins branch once near the leaflet margin and may either enter a tooth or sinus, or branch again before entering a tooth or sinus. On occasion a vein branch may form a loop upwards and joint to the next secondary vein apically. The teeth are rounded on their tips with convex basal and apical sides running towards variable sinuses. The leafy wings of the rachis do not show any obvious vein structure, unlike R. republicensis.
