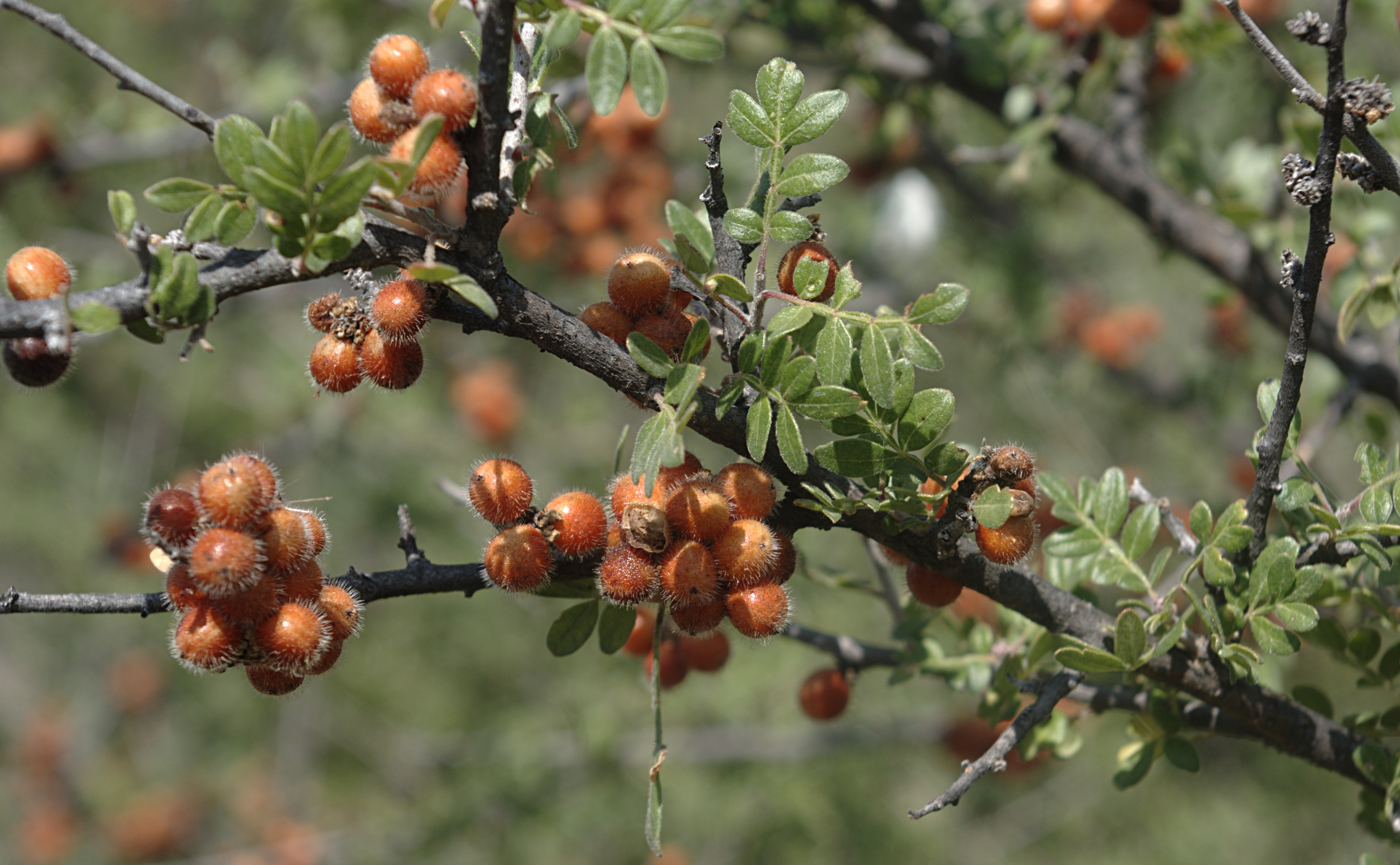
- Rhus microphylla fruit

Scientific classification
- Kingdom: Plantae
- Clade: Tracheophytes
- Clade: Angiosperms
- Clade: Eudicots
- Clade: Rosids
- Order: Sapindales
- Family: Anacardiaceae
- Genus: Rhus
- Species: R. microphylla

Binomial name
- Rhus microphylla Engelm. ex A.Gray
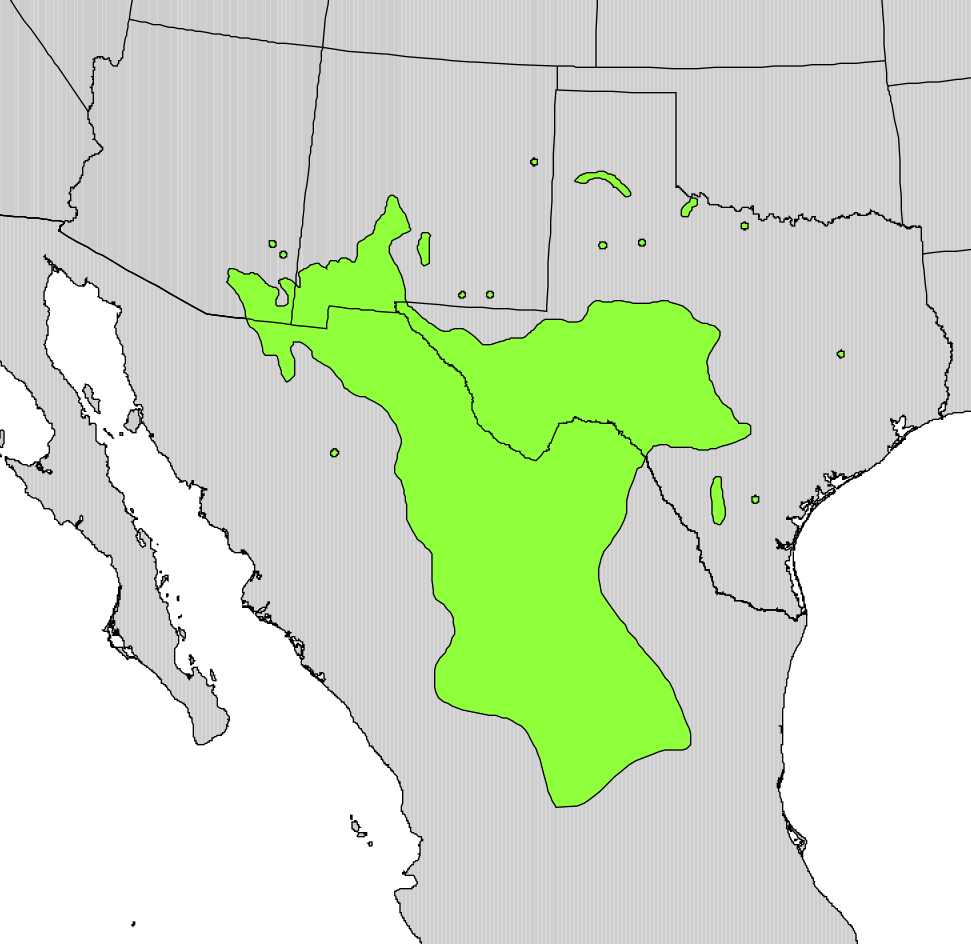
- Natural range of Rhus microphylla

= Rhus microphylla =

Rhus microphylla Littleleaf sumac

Species of tree

Rhus microphylla, the littleleaf sumac, desert sumac, correosa, or agritos, is a species of sumac in the family Anacardiaceae, native to North America, in the southwestern United States and northern and central Mexico, from central and western Texas, southern and central New Mexico, central and northern regions of the Mexican Altiplano-(Mexican Plateau), and extreme southeastern Arizona of the Madrean Sky Islands.
