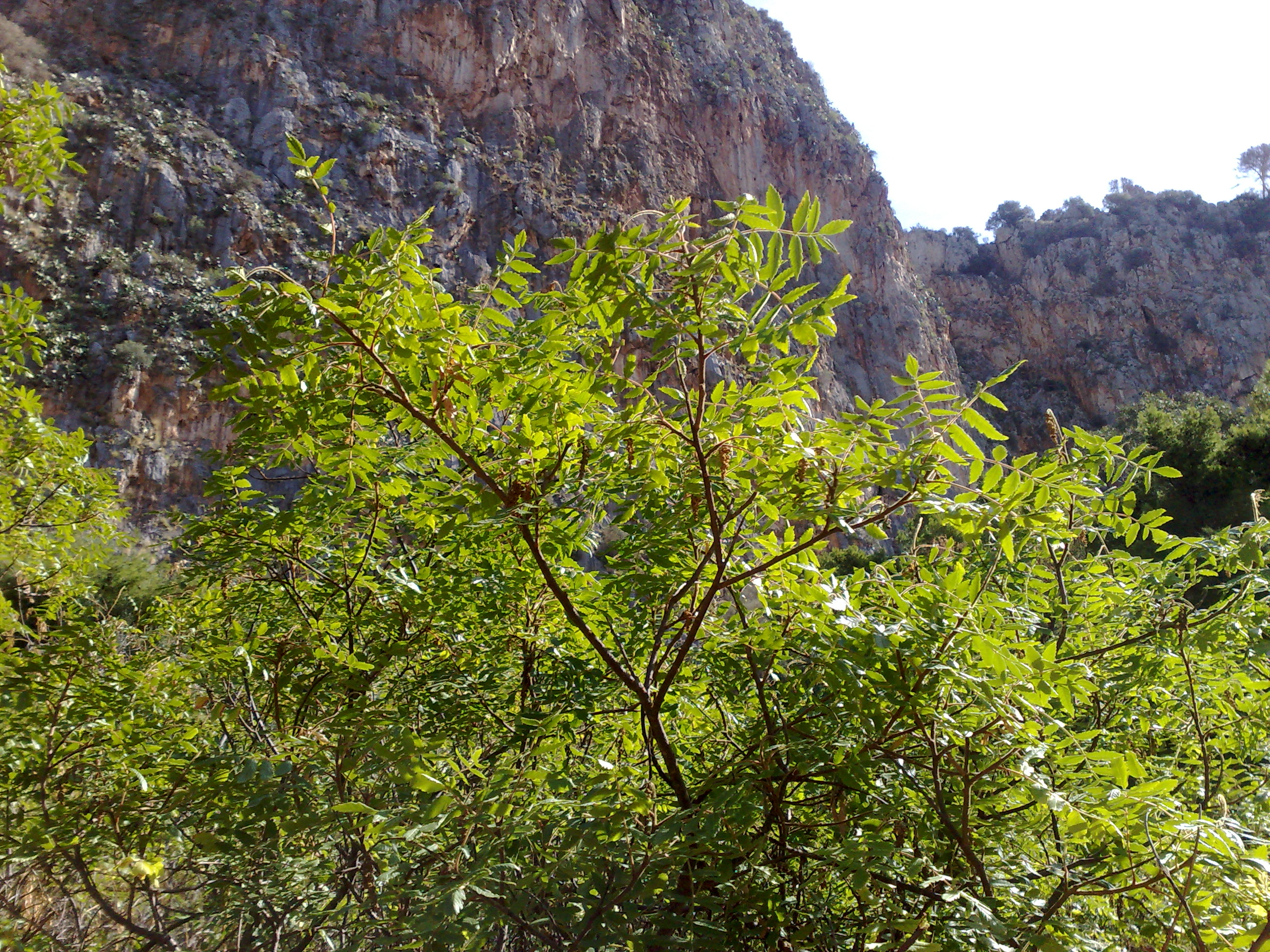

Conservation status
- Least Concern (IUCN 3.1)

Scientific classification
- Kingdom: Plantae
- Clade: Tracheophytes
- Clade: Angiosperms
- Clade: Eudicots
- Clade: Rosids
- Order: Sapindales
- Family: Anacardiaceae
- Genus: Rhus
- Species: R. coriaria

Binomial name
- Rhus coriaria L.

Synonyms
- Rhus heterophylla C.C.Gmel.; Rhus sumac O.Targ.Tozz.; Rhus variifolia DC.; Toxicodendron coriaria (L.) Kuntze

= Rhus coriaria =

Species of shrub

Rhus coriaria, commonly called Sicilian sumac, tanner's sumach, or elm-leaved sumach, is a deciduous shrub to small tree in the cashew family Anacardiaceae. It is native to southern Europe and western Asia. The dried fruits are used as a spice, particularly in combination with other spices in the mixture called za'atar.

== Etymology ==
The word originally comes from Hebrew סמק, then through the Aramaic summāqā 'red', via Arabic, Latin, and French.

== Distribution and habitat ==
Rhus coriaria is native to southern Europe and western Asia, including the Eastern Mediterranean, Crimea, Caucasus and northern Iran, but is now naturalized in most of the Mediterranean Basin as well as Macaronesia.

== Cultivation ==
Rhus coriaria is a hardy, drought-tolerant, deciduous shrub growing to 3 metres (10 ft) at a medium rate or to a small tree up to 5 m (16 ft) high. It prefers full sun. It is frost-sensitive and can be grown in USDA hardiness zones 8-11 and UK zone 9. The plant will grow in any type of soil that is deep and well-drained, including poor, rocky, alkaline or slightly acidic soils.

== Uses ==
The fruit has a sour taste; dried and crushed, it is a popular spice in the Middle East, used especially in the spice mixture za'atar. Immature fruits and seeds are also eaten. Mature fruits were also known well before lemons to the Europeans since the times of the ancient Romans, who appreciated its sourness and used it in vinaigrettes like lemons in modern times. It is traditionally used and also clinically investigated for lipid lowing effects.

The leaves and the bark were traditionally used in leather tanning and contain tannic acid.

Dyes of various colours, red, yellow, black, and brown, can be made from different parts of the plant.

Oil extracted from the seeds can be used to make candles.

== Images ==
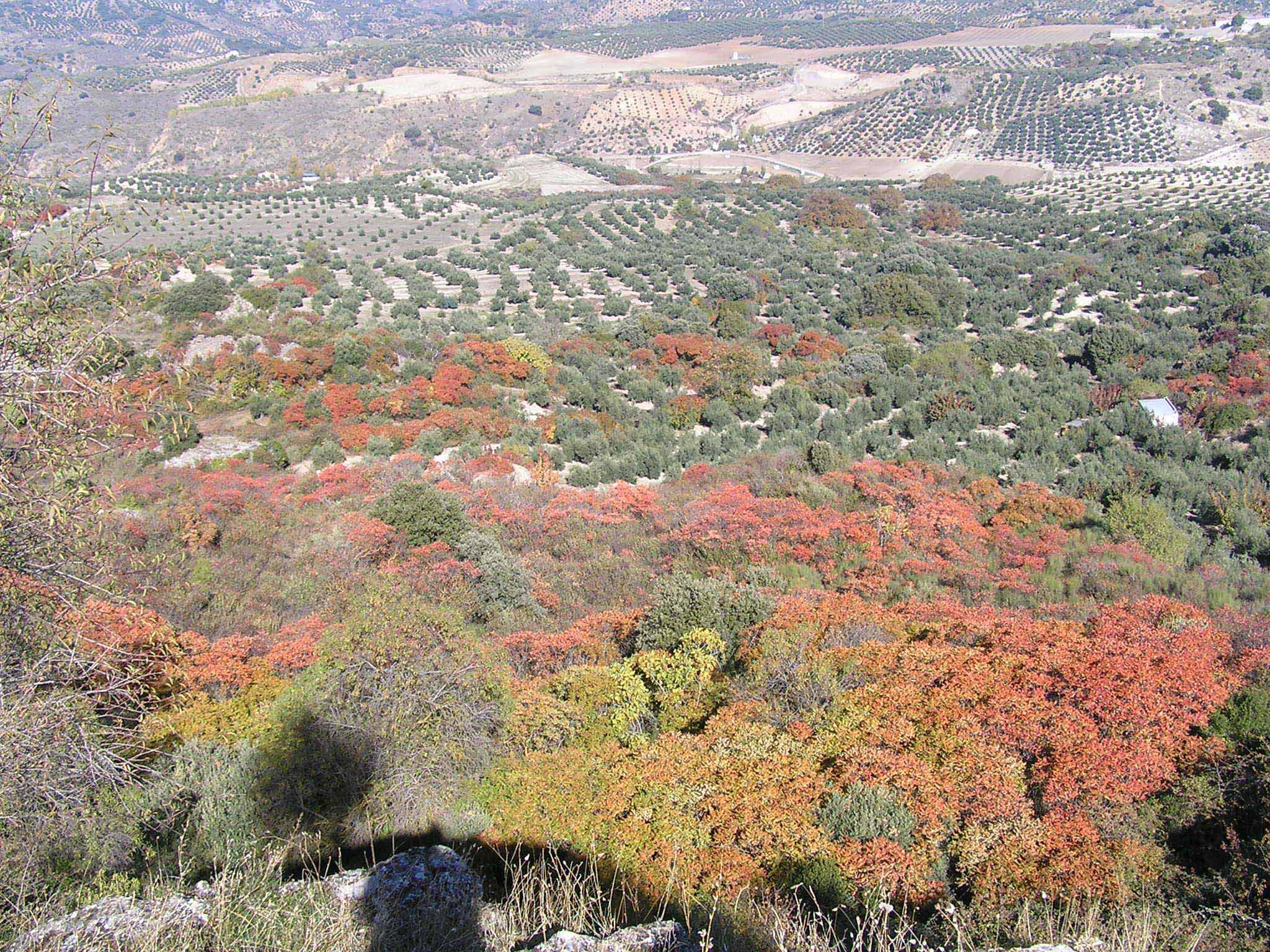
Cultivated R. coriaria with olive trees in Spain

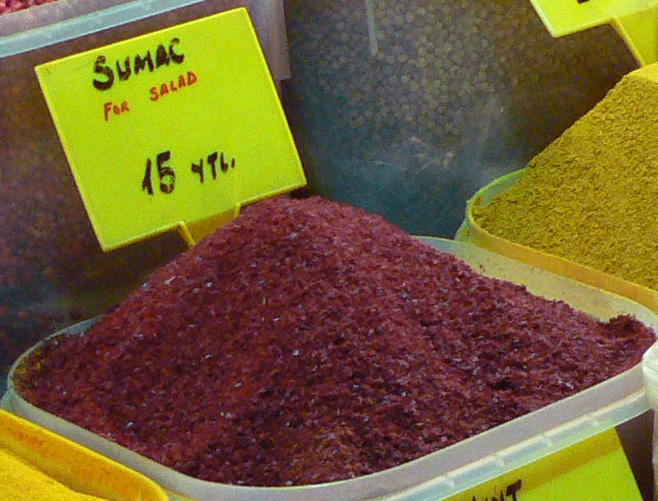
Spice (ground fruit) for sale in Istanbul

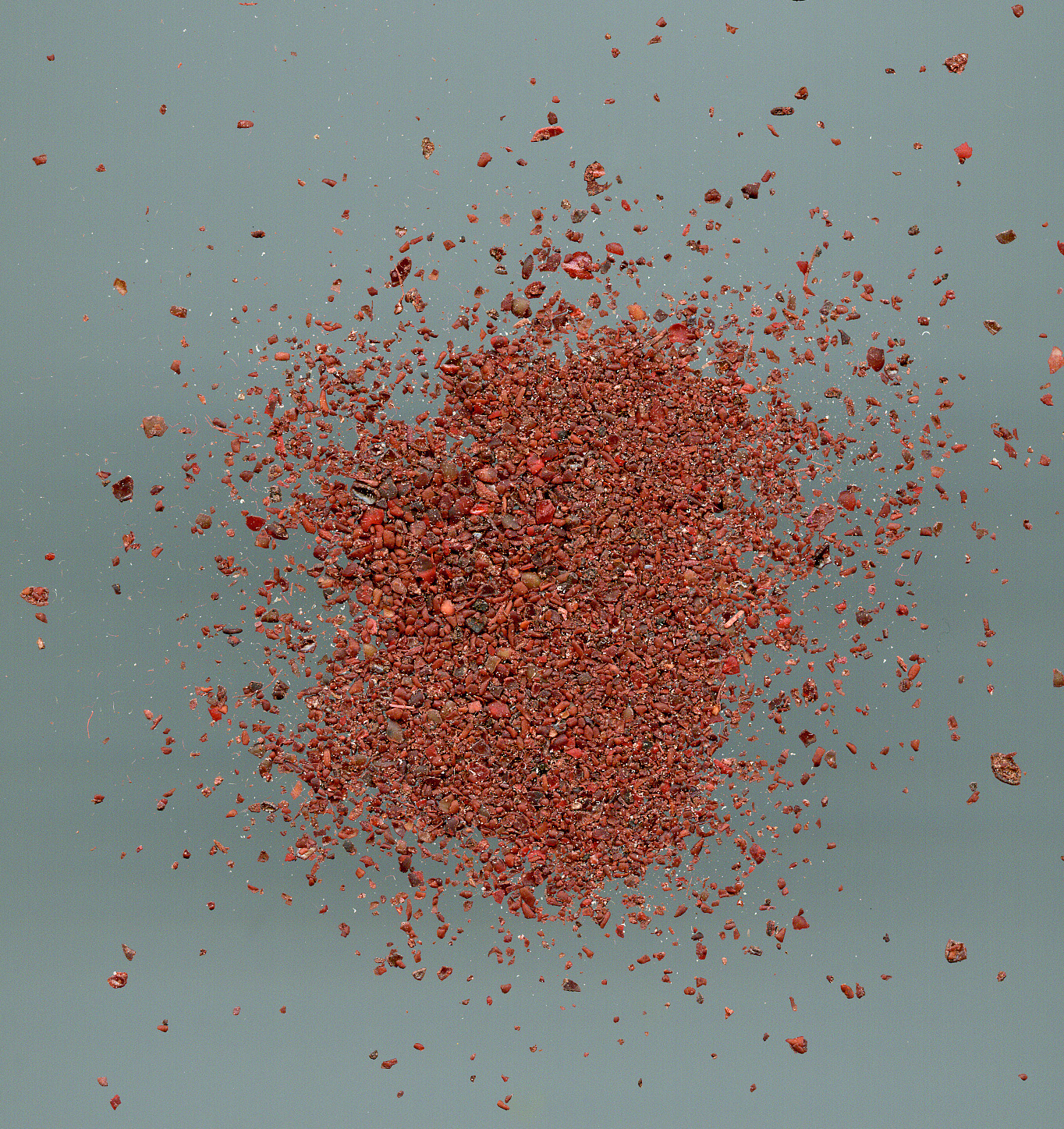
Spice, close-up
