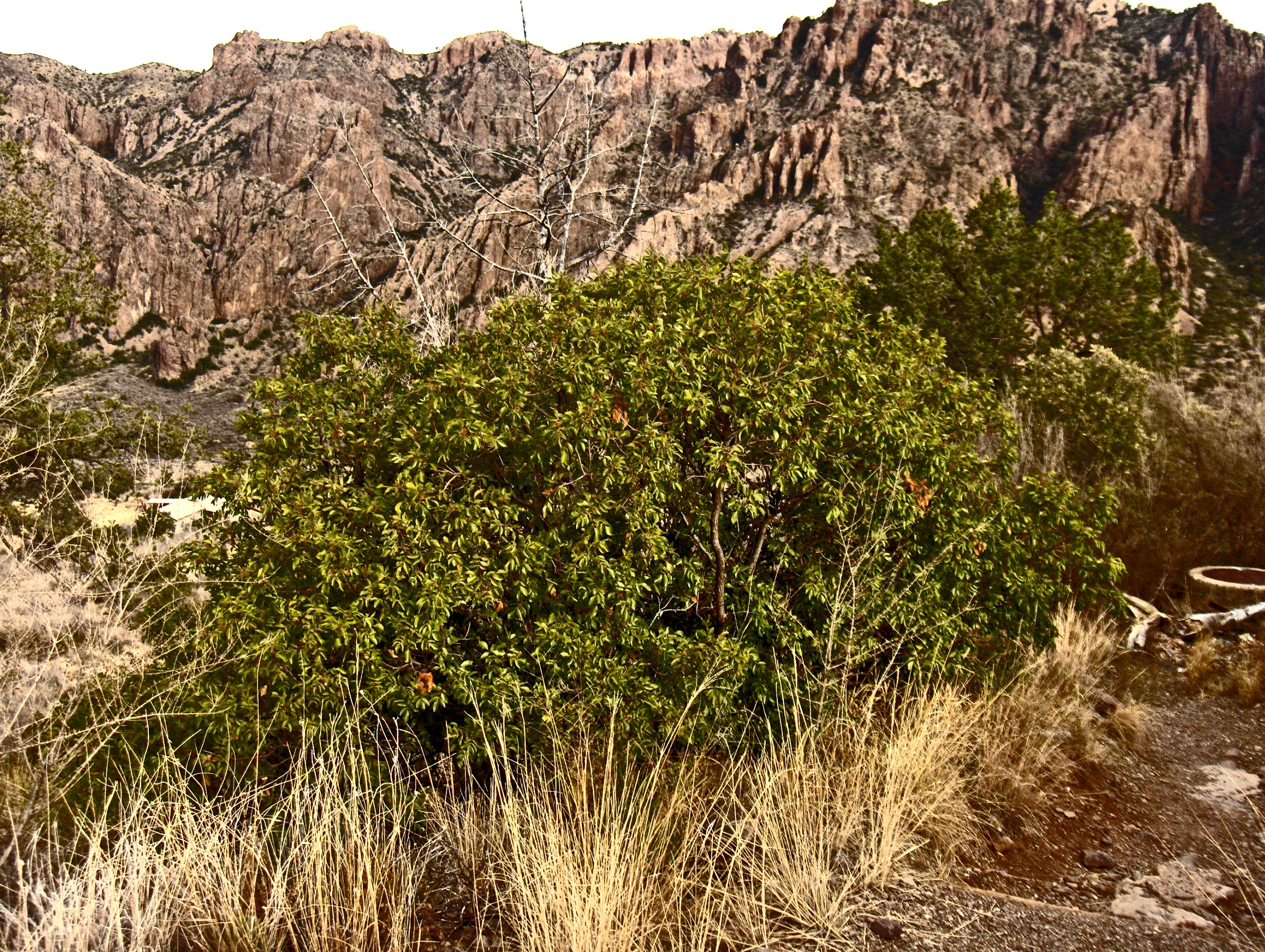

Scientific classification
- Kingdom: Plantae
- Clade: Tracheophytes
- Clade: Angiosperms
- Clade: Eudicots
- Clade: Rosids
- Order: Sapindales
- Family: Anacardiaceae
- Genus: Rhus
- Species: R. virens

Binomial name
- Rhus virens Lindh. ex A.Gray

Varieties
- R. virens var. choriophylla R. virens var. virens
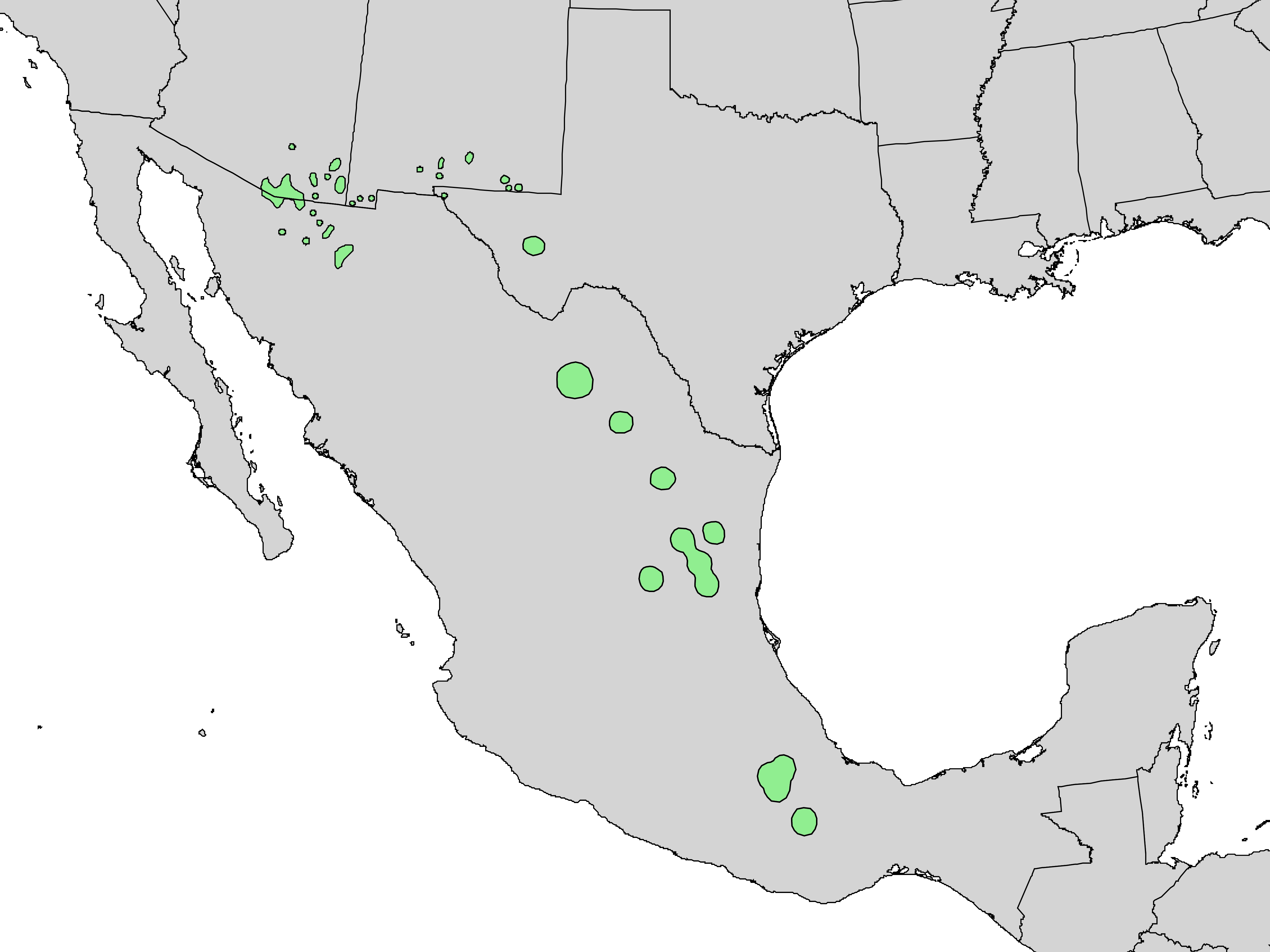
- Natural range of Rhus virens

= Rhus virens =

Species of tree

Rhus virens is a species of flowering plant in the mango family, Anacardiaceae, that is native to Arizona, southern New Mexico, and Texas in the United States as well as northern and central Mexico as far south as Oaxaca. It is commonly known as the evergreen sumac or tobacco sumac.

== Varieties ==
- Rhus virens var. choriophylla (Wooton & Standl.) L.D.Benson – Mearns' sumac
- Rhus virens var. virens
