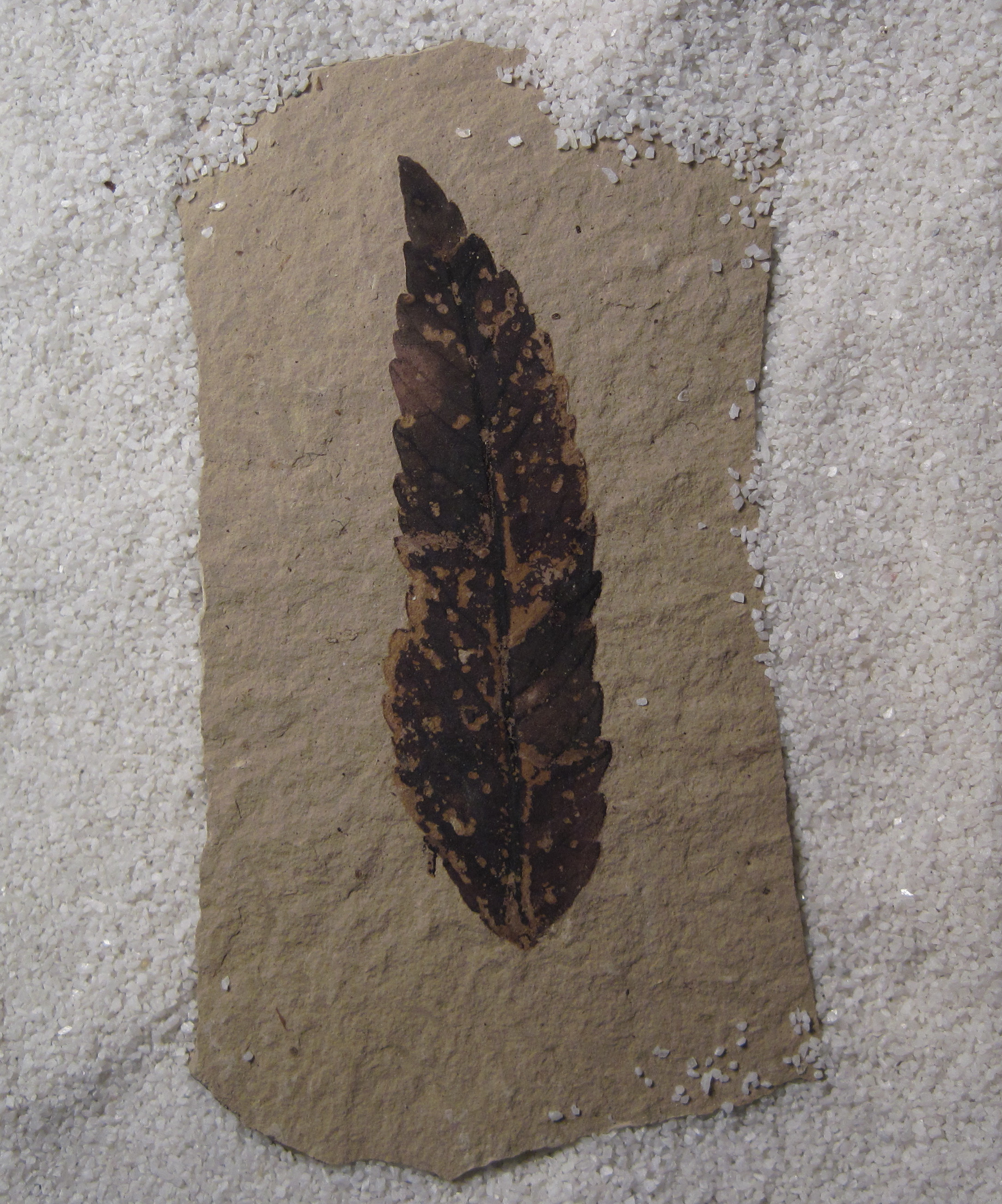
- Rhus malloryi leaflet

Scientific classification
- Kingdom: Plantae
- Clade: Tracheophytes
- Clade: Angiosperms
- Clade: Eudicots
- Clade: Rosids
- Order: Sapindales
- Family: Anacardiaceae
- Genus: Rhus
- Species: †R. malloryi

Binomial name
- †Rhus malloryi Wolfe & Wehr, 1987

Synonyms
- Dipteronia americana (in part)

= Rhus malloryi =

Rhus malloryi Temporal range: Ypresian

Extinct species of flowering plant

Rhus malloryi is an extinct species of flowering plant in the sumac family Anacardiaceae. The species is known from fossil leaves found in the early Eocene deposits of northern Washington state, United States. The species was first described from a series of isolated fossil leaves in shale. R. malloryi is one of four sumac species to be described from the Klondike Mountain Formation, and forms a hybrid complex with the other three species.

== Taxonomy ==
Rhus malloryi is known from specimens which are recovered from an outcrop of the early Eocene, Ypresian Klondike Mountain Formation in Republic. The Klondike Mountain Formation preserves an upland temperate flora which was first interpreted as being microthermal, however further study has shown the flora to be more mesothermal in nature. The plant community preserved in the Klondike Mountain formation is a mixed conifer–broadleaf forest with large pollen elements of birch and golden larch, but also having notable traces of fir, spruce, cypress, and palm. Fossils of Rhus malloryi, along with fossil Sapindaceae leaves, were first published under the name "Dipteronia americana" by Roland W. Brown in 1935. The coeval fossil species Rhus mixta is noted to have a more linear shape and distinct secondary vein structure.

The species was described from a type specimen, the holotype leaf, number UWBM 39718, and a group of five paratype specimens. The holotype and three of the paratypes are currently preserved in the paleobotanical collections of the Burke Museum of Natural History and Culture in Seattle, Washington. The specimens were studied by paleobotanists Jack A. Wolfe of the United States Geological Survey, Denver office and Wesley C. Wehr of the Burke Museum. Wolfe and Wehr published their 1987 type description for R. malloryi in the United states Geological Survey Bulletin 1597. The etymology of the chosen specific name malloryi is in recognition of former chairman of the Burke Museum paleontology collections V. Standish Mallory. An additional three coeval species, Rhus boothillensis, Rhus garwellii and Rhus republicensis were described by Flynn et al in 2019. They also provided a redescription of Rhus malloryi while noting that the Klondike Mountain Formation preserves a number of Rhus specimens which appear to be hybrids of the named species.

== Description ==
Overall the leaflets of R. malloryi are elliptical to lanceolate, with a symmetrical shape, an asymmetrical base and a short petiolule. The leaflets have a pinnate vein structure with the secondary veins display a gradually curving, looping structure typical of Anacardiaceae. The margins of the leaflets are serrated and have the simple teeth are spaced to one tooth per secondary vein loop. Veinlets from the secondary veins either enter the teeth centrally or enter the sinuses between teeth. Higher veins in the leaflets tend to thin rapidly or are indistinct, in contrast to the secondary vein structure of Rhus mixta which has stronger secondary veins.
