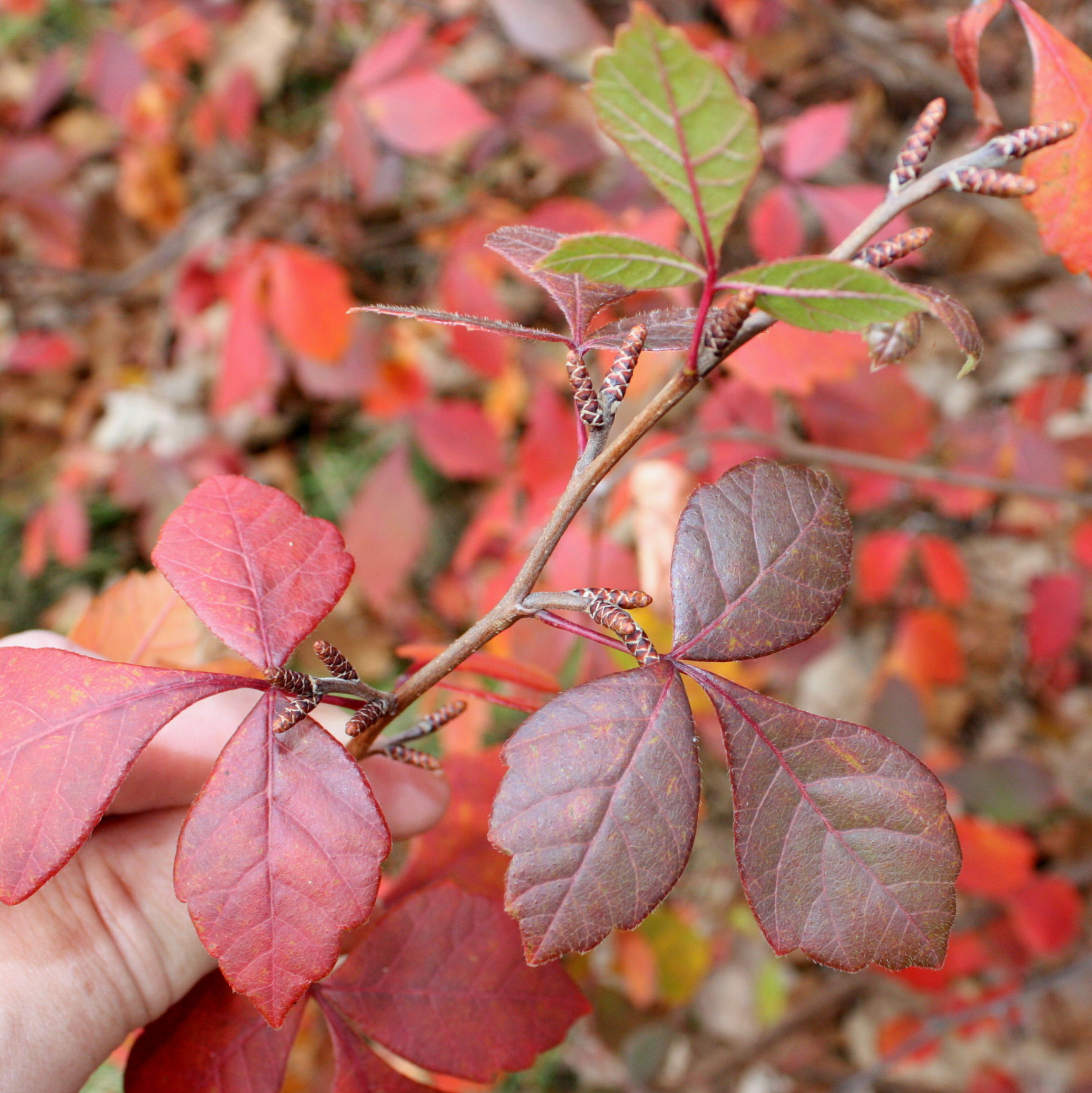
- Fragrant sumac: Autumnal color

Scientific classification
- Kingdom: Plantae
- Clade: Tracheophytes
- Clade: Angiosperms
- Clade: Eudicots
- Clade: Rosids
- Order: Sapindales
- Family: Anacardiaceae
- Genus: Rhus
- Species: R. aromatica

Binomial name
- Rhus aromatica L.

= Rhus aromatica =

Species of shrub

Rhus aromatica, commonly known as fragrant sumac, smooth sumac, aromatic sumac, lemon sumac, skunk bush, polecat bush, polecat sumac, or simply sumac, is a deciduous shrub in the family Anacardiaceae native to North America. It is native to southern and eastern Canada, most of the contiguous United States, and Mexico.

== Description ==
Fragrant sumac is a woody plant with a rounded form that grows to around 2 ft (0.6 m) to 5 ft (1.5 m) tall and 5 ft (1.5 m) to 10 ft (3.0 m) wide. The plant develops yellow flowers in clusters on short lateral shoots in March through May. The flower is a small, dense inflorescence that usually opens before the plant's leaves do. Flowers and drupes appear earlier in the year than on other Sumac species.

The species is polygamodioecious, which means that it is mostly dioecious, primarily bearing flowers of only one sex, but with either a few flowers of the opposite sex or a few bisexual flowers on the same plant. Male (staminate) flowers develop in yellowish catkins, while female (pistillate) flowers develop in short bright yellow panicles at the ends of branches.

Pollinated flowers develop clusters of 5 mm (0.2 in) to 7 mm (0.3 in) hairy red drupes containing a single nutlet during June through August. The fruits become an important winter food for birds and small mammals that can remain on the plant until spring if not eaten.

The plant's alternate leaves are usually compound, and have three leaflets that vary in shape, lobing, and margination. There is a single leaf variety that grows in dry areas of SW. North America. The unstalked leaflets are ovate to rhomboid, more or less wedge-shaped at the base, coarsely-toothed and usually shiny glabrous above. The terminal leaflet is 3 cm (1.2 in) to 6.5 cm (2.6 in) long.

The plant's green to glossy blue-green summer foliage becomes orange to red or purple in the fall. Stems are thin and brownish-gray, with rust-colored lenticels when young. Leaves and stems emit a lemon scent when crushed. There are no terminal buds, but overwintering male catkins are present.

== Taxonomy ==
Rhus aromatica belongs to the plant family Anacardiaceae and the genus Rhus. Rhus is a Greek word for Sumac. The specific epithet, aromatica, simply means fragrant.

Rhus aromatica was once considered two species, the western North American one named Rhus trilobata. According to the Oregon State University, College of Agricultural Sciences - Department of Horticulture, "There are no consistent geographical patterns to variations in characteristics, some authorities suggest that Rhus aromatica is best considered a polymorphic species consisting of only two varieties, the eastern North American form, Rhus aromatica var. aromatica, and the western form, Rhus aromatica var. trilobata."

Subspecies

- Rhus aromatica Aiton var. aromatica
- Rhus aromatica Aiton var. arenaria (Greene) Fernald
- Rhus aromatica Aiton var. serotina (Greene) Rehder
- Rhus aromatica var. simplicifolia (Greene) Cronquist

Fragrant sumac has trifoliate leaves that resemble those of the related poison ivy (Toxicodendron radicans) and poison oak (Toxicodendron pubescens). However, both poison ivy and poison oak have central leaflet with a leaflet stem, or petiolule, whereas fragrant sumac's does not.

== Distribution and habitat ==
Fragrant sumac is common along the forested eastern margins of the Great Plains and in open or otherwise disturbed sites on the margins of the Gulf Coast prairie. It grows at a range of sites including open rocky woodlands, valley bottoms, lower rocky slopes, and roadsides. It is not widely used for landscape plantings but can be used as a ground cover, especially on banks. The plant's colorful fall foliage is its main ornamental feature.

The plant grows in deep shade to full sun and well-drained slightly acid soils to well-drained alkaline with a pH range of about 6.0 to 8.5. It has a shallow, fibrous root system and is easily transplanted. Some of its branches can trail upon the ground and develop roots. The plant can ground sucker to form a colony. Developed thickets provide cover for small mammals and birds.

Rhizomes and roots in the soil allow R. aromatica to sprout following fire events.

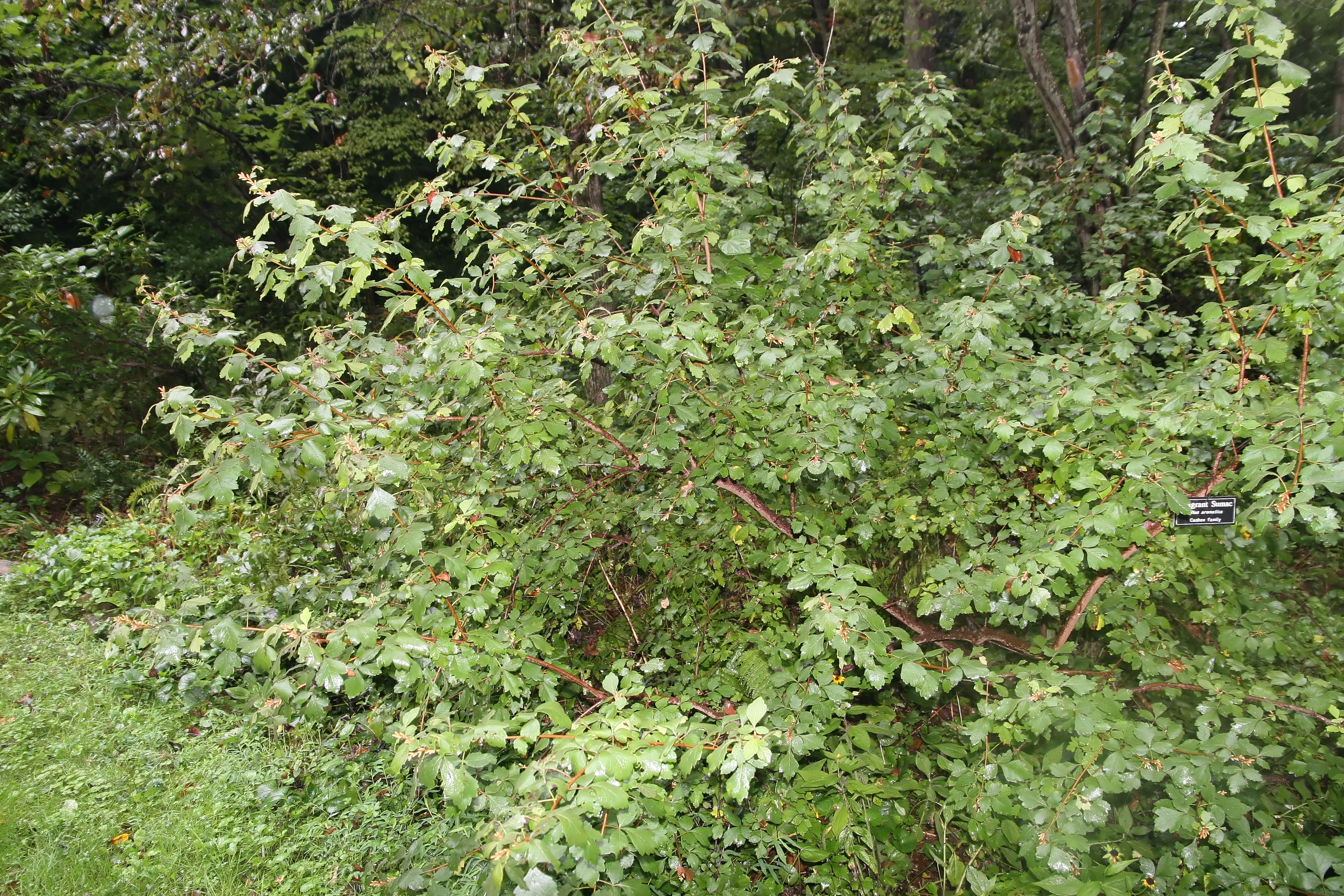
Spread

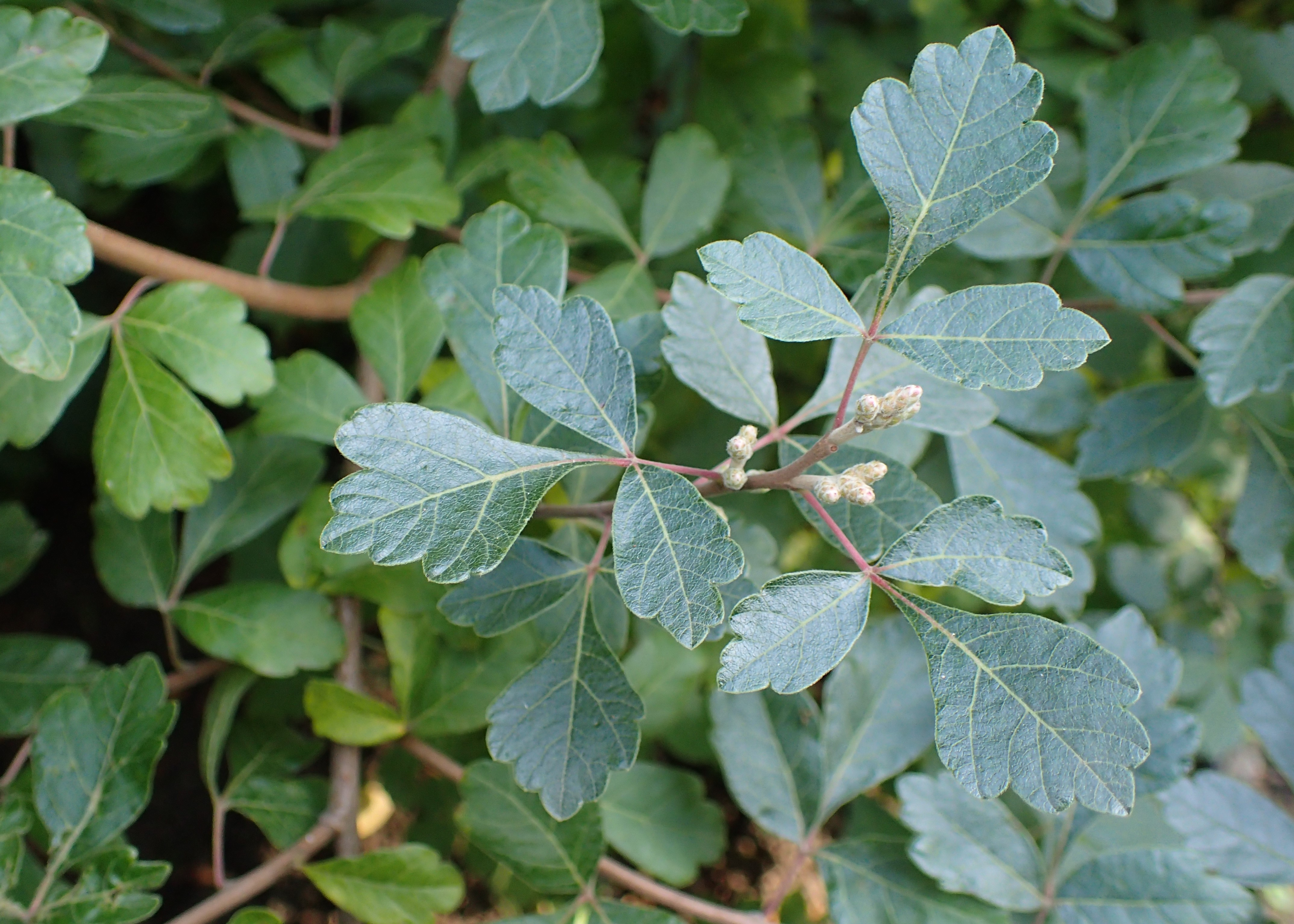
Foliage

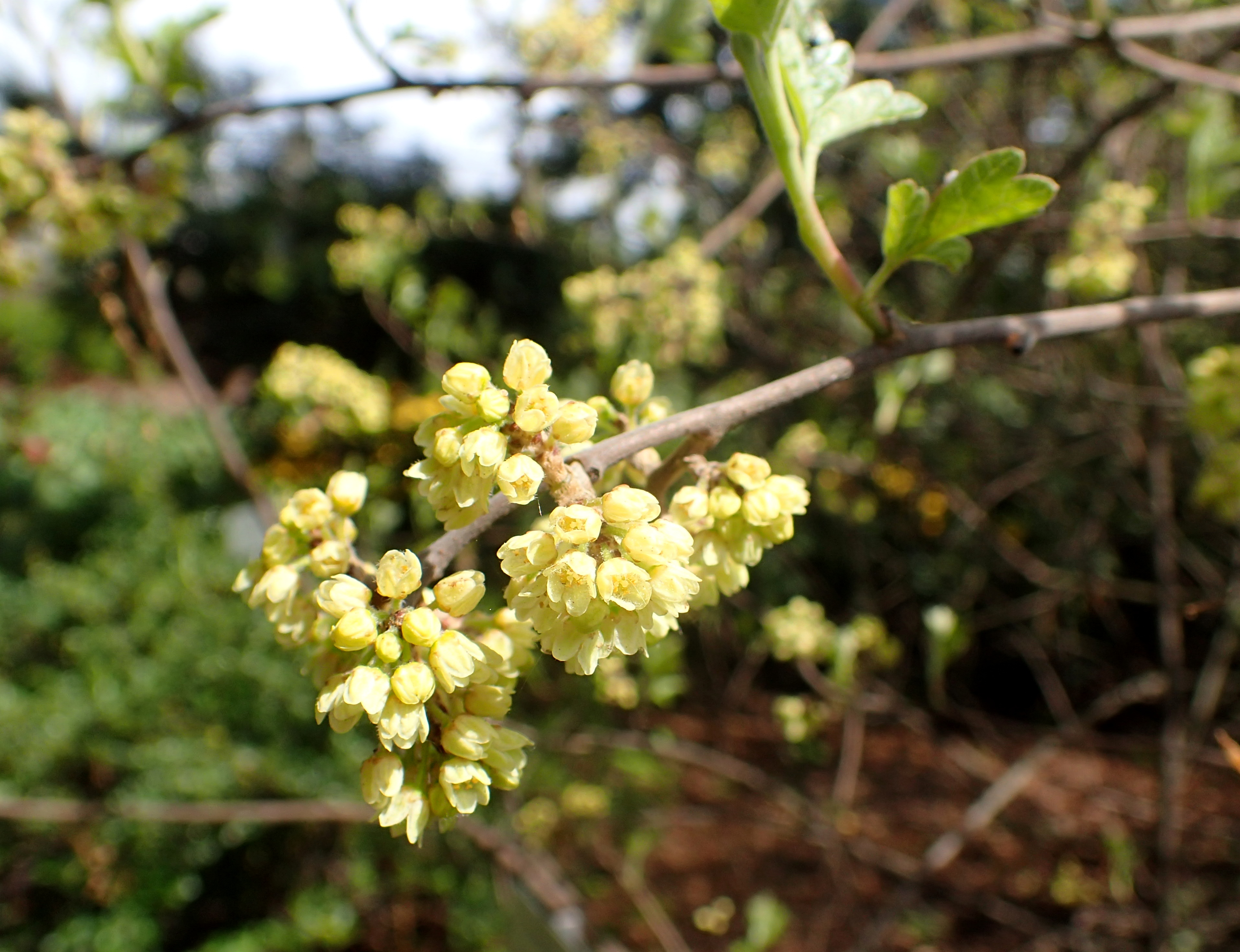
Pistillate inflorescence

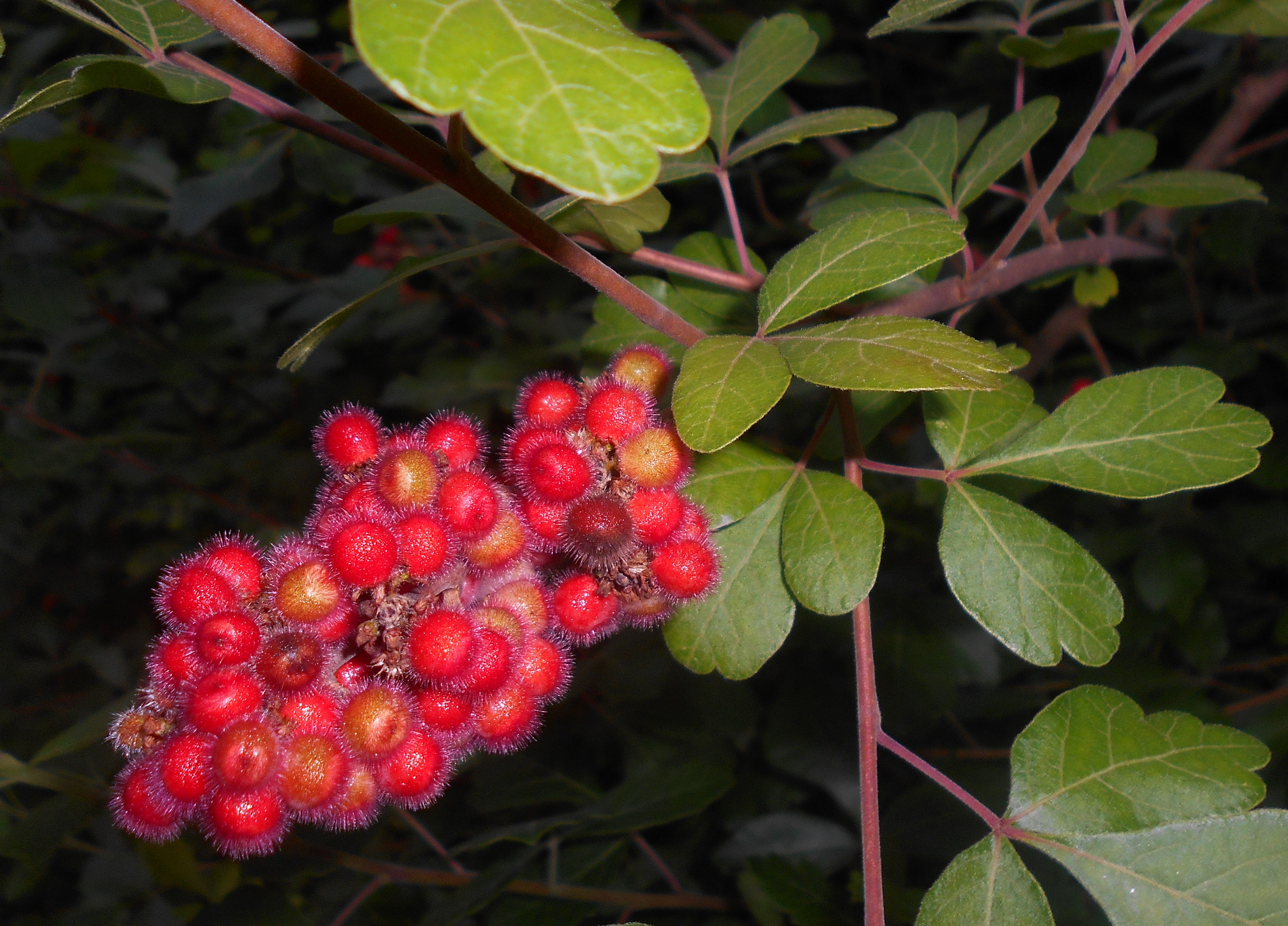
Fruit

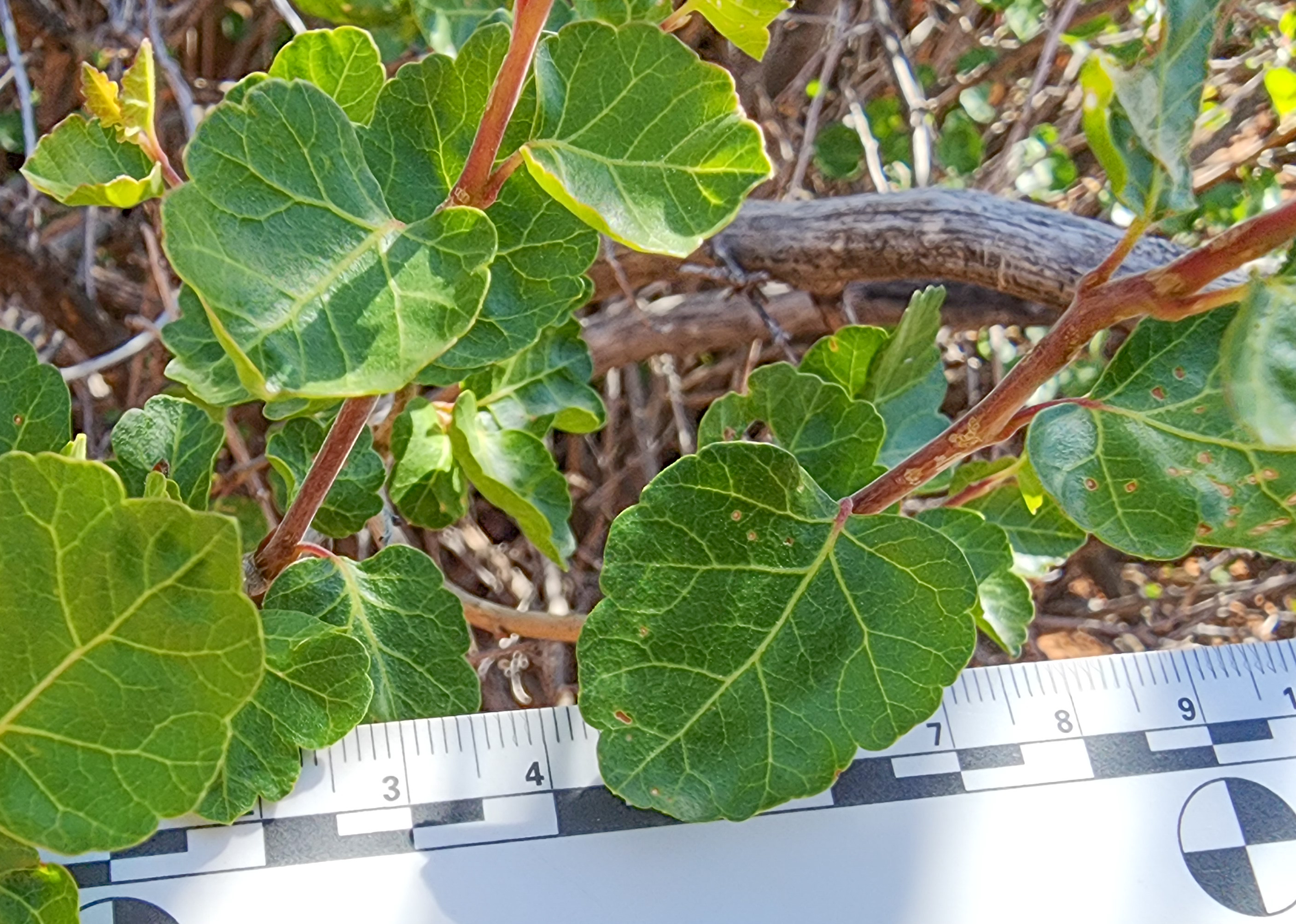
The single leaf variety.

== Common diseases and pests ==
Fragrant sumac has no major diseases or pests. It has been known to be affected by leaf spots, rust, aphids, scale, and mites. Nipple galls are a somewhat common problem affecting foliage appearance, but damage is cosmetic. Cultivars of fragrant sumac, such as Konza, have been found to be resistant to leaf rust and insect damage.

== Uses ==
Historically, Native American tribes have used fragrant sumac to treat health problems and various illnesses. The ripe berries were made into a tart drink. In addition to this, the leaves and bark were used in leather making due to their high tannin content. To create a smoking mixture, the leaves were combined with tobacco.

R. aromatica can be used to stabilize soil and prevent erosion on embankments or hard-to-cover areas.

A study showed strong antiviral activity against two types of herpes in vitro using aqueous extractions of R. aromatica.

== Conservation status in the United States ==
Rhus aromatica is listed as of special concern and believed extirpated in Connecticut. However, this status applies only to native populations. In Washington, Connecticut, and New Hampshire it is considered introduced. Globally, fragrant sumac is listed as G5 or secure.
