= Concavistylon =

Concavistylon Temporal range: Langhian

Scientific classification
- Kingdom: Plantae
- Clade: Tracheophytes
- Clade: Angiosperms
- Clade: Eudicots
- Order: Trochodendrales
- Family: Trochodendraceae
- Genus: †Concavistylon
- Species: †C. kvacekii

Binomial name
- †Concavistylon kvacekii Manchester, Pigg, & DeVore, 2018

Extinct genus of flowering plants

Concavistylon is an extinct genus of flowering plant in the family Trochodendraceae comprising a single species Concavistylon kvacekii. The genus is known from fossils found in Middle Miocene deposits of central Oregon. A second species "Concavistylon" wehrii was originally placed in Concavistylon, but subsequently moved to a new genus Paraconcavistylon in 2020.

== Distribution and paleoenvironment ==
Concavistylon kvacekii fossils were found in the Moose Mountain Flora, formerly called the Cascadia flora or Menagerie Wilderness flora, of Linn County, Oregon. The flora is included in the Little Butte Volcanic series outcropping near the town of Cascadia in the central Oregon Cascades. Work on the flora by paleobotanist Jack Wolfe in 1964 gave an estimated age of Early Miocene, this was later revised by Wolfe and Tanai in 1987 to a Late Oligocene estimation. In the descriptive paper naming Concavistylon Manchester et al. reported that radioisotope dating of plagioclase crystals collected by Robert Rosé from the fossiliferous horizon of the Moose Mountain flora had been performed. Using crystals obtained from tuffaceous sandstones, Argon–argon dating provided an age of 14.91 ± 0.23 Ma placing the flora as Middle Miocene Langhian stage. C. kvacekii is found associated with species such as Acer cascadense, Acer smileyi, Ozakia emryi, Trochodendron postnastae, and Trochodendron rosayi.

== Taxonomy and phylogeny ==
The type species holotype was originally collected during the 1950s by Eleanor Gordon Thompson and donated to the University of California Museum of Paleontology in Berkeley, California as specimen UCMP 151875. Study of the fossil by paleobotanists Steven Manchester, Kathleen Pigg, and Melanie DeVore, resulted in the description of Concavistylon kvacekii published 60 years later in 2018. The etymology of the genus name was explained, while the specific name "kvacekii" was coined as a patronym honoring Czech paleobotanist Zlatko Kvaček.

In a paper published nearly concurrently, a second species was described and placed into the genus as Concavistylon wehrii. The new species was from the older Ypresian age Klondike Mountain Formation of northeastern Washington and McAbee Fossil Beds in central British Columbia. The description of Paleocene trochodendraceous fossils from Wyoming and a phylogenetic analysis of two living and four extinct genera indicated that Concavistylon was not monophyletic. Based on the pendulous nature of "C." wehrii inflorescences, which are distinct from the erect inflorescences of C. kvacekii, the new genus Paraconcavistylon was erected with "C." wehrii as the type species.

- Trochodendraceae
  - Trochodendron
  - - Eotrochion polystylum
    - - - Concavistylon kvacekii
        - - Paraconcavistylon wehrii
          - - Pentacentron sternhartae
            - Tetracentron

== Description ==
The fruiting bodies of Concavistylon kvacekii are simple 40–51 mm (1.6–2.0 in) long racemes with a stout 1.3–1.8 mm (0.051–0.071 in) central stem. The fruits are either subsessile or born on very short pedicels. Each fruit is composed of between four and six carpels and range between 2.5–3.4 mm (0.098–0.134 in) wide by 3–4 mm (0.12–0.16 in) tall. There are between four and five persistent styles that curve upwards towards the fruit apex, a feature not seen in either Tetracentron or Trochodendron where the styles curve out and down from the fruit. The fruits open in a four to six ray dehiscence split.
