= Trochodendron rosayi =

Trochodendron postnastae Temporal range: Langhian

Scientific classification
- Kingdom: Plantae
- Clade: Tracheophytes
- Clade: Angiosperms
- Clade: Eudicots
- Order: Trochodendrales
- Family: Trochodendraceae
- Genus: Trochodendron
- Species: †T. rosayi

Binomial name
- †Trochodendron rosayi Manchester, Pigg, & DeVore, 2018

Extinct species of flowering plant

Trochodendron rosayi is an extinct species of flowering plant in the family Trochodendraceae. The species is known from fossils found in Middle Miocene deposits of central Oregon. T. rosayi are possibly the fruits belonging to the extinct trochodendraceous leaf species Trochodendron postnastae.

== Distribution and paleoenvironment ==
Trochodendron rosayi fossils are found in the Moose Mountain Flora, formerly called the Cascadia flora or Menagerie Wilderness flora, of Linn County, Oregon. The flora is included in the Little Butte Volcanic series outcropping near the town of Cascadia in the central Oregon Cascades. Work on the flora by paleobotanist Jack Wolfe in 1964 gave an estimated age of Early Miocene, this was later revised by Wolfe and Tanai in 1987 to a Late Oligocene estimation. In the descriptive paper naming T. postnastae Manchester et al reported that radioisotope dating of plagioclase crystals collected by Robert Rosé from the fossiliferous horizon of the Moose Mountain flora had been performed. Using crystals obtained from tuffaceous sandstones, Argon–argon dating provided an age of 14.91 ± 0.23 Ma placing the flora as Middle Miocene Langhian stage. T. postnastae is found associated with species such as Acer cascadense, Acer smileyi, Concavistylon kvacekii, Ozakia emryi, and Trochodendron postnastae. The fruits are noted to be similar in size to the living Trochodendron aralioides while being bigger than the coeval Concavistylon fruits.

Several additional Middle Miocene fossils were considered by Manchester et al to also be T. rosayi specimens. In 1991, Manchester et al made the first mention of several infructescences, including a figured specimen from the Latah Formation at Emerald Creek, Idaho. At that time the fossils were suggested to be indistinguishable from living T. aralioides fruits. Similarly a fossil first figured by Fields (1996) from the Sucker Creek Formation in eastern Oregon is also considered to belong to T. rosayi.

== Taxonomy ==
The species holotype was collected by Robert Rosé and is part of the Florida Museum of Natural History's collections in Gainesville, Florida. The fossil was studied by paleobotanists Steven Manchester, Kathleen Pigg, and Melanie DeVore with their 2019 type description being published in the journal Fossil Imprint. The etymology of the specific name rosayi is a patronym honoring Robert Rosé.

In addition to T rosayi Manchester et al provided descriptions of the coeval species Trochodendron postnastae and the related trochodendraceous species Concavistylon kvacekii. Based on the similarities of the T. rosayi fruits and T postnastae foliage, and on similar leaf and fruit associations in the older Klondike Mountain Formation of Washington state, Manchester et al considered it possible that the leaves and fruits were produced by the same plant. At the time of description however the two organs had not been found in connection, and so where described under separate names. The fruits are over double the size of the older Ypresian age Trochodendron drachukii fruits from the McAbee Fossil Beds in Canada.

== Description ==
Trochodendron rosayi fruits are born on 18–20 mm (0.71–0.79 in) pedicels sprouting from a 1.8–2.0 mm (0.071–0.079 in) thick central stalk. The 7.5–10 mm (0.30–0.39 in) fruits have a globose to turbinate outline, with a narrow base that flares out towards the apex. The tops of the fruits are rounded with approximately ten locular slits joining at the fruit apex to from a polygonal opening when the mature fruits dehisced. The locular slits form just above the straight to slightly outwardly curved persistent styles which sprout from the fruit 1/3 of the way below the apex. Below the styles are triangular flattened structures that were likely the flower nectaries. Encircling the basal section of the fruits are an estimated 25 scars left by the shed stamens.
