= Paraconcavistylon =

Paraconcavistylon Temporal range: Ypresian

Scientific classification
- Kingdom: Plantae
- Clade: Tracheophytes
- Clade: Angiosperms
- Clade: Eudicots
- Order: Trochodendrales
- Family: Trochodendraceae
- Genus: †Paraconcavistylon; Manchester, Kvaček, & Judd, 2020
- Species: †P. wehrii

Binomial name
- †Paraconcavistylon wehrii (Manchester et al., 2018)

Synonyms
- Concavistylon wehrii

Extinct genus of plant

Paraconcavistylon is an extinct genus of flowering plant in the family Trochodendraceae comprises a single species, Paraconcavistylon wehrii. The genus is known from fossil fruits and leaves found in the early Eocene deposits of northern Washington state, United States, and southern British Columbia, Canada. The species was initially described as a member of the related extinct genus Concavistylon as "Concavistylon" wehrii, but subsequently moved to the new genus Paraconcavistylon in 2020 after additional study.

== Distribution and paleoenvironment ==
Paraconcavistylon wehrii is known from specimens which were recovered from outcrops of the early Eocene, Ypresian Klondike Mountain Formation in Republic and coeval McAbee Fossil Beds near Cache Creek, British Columbia. The Klondike Mountain Formation and McAbee Fossil sites preserve upland temperate floras which were first interpreted as being microthermal, however further study has shown the floras to be more mesothermal in nature. The plant community preserved in the Klondike Mountain formation is a mixed conifer–broadleaf forest with large pollen elements of birch and golden larch, but also having notable traces of fir, spruce, cypress, and palm.

== Taxonomy and phylogeny ==
The holotype was originally collected by Dwyane Day 1999 and subsequently donated to the University of Washington's Burke Museum as specimen UWBM PB 101336. One of the paratypes, specimen USNM 537360 is the earliest collected specimen, being recovered in 1901 by then Washington State Geologist Harry Landis. Study of the fossil by paleobotanists Steven Manchester et al resulted in the description of "Concavistylon" wehrii being published in 2018, 117 years after the Landis specimen was found. The specific name wehrii was chosen as a patronym honoring Wesley "Wes" Wehr for his enthusiasm and generosity.

Often plant fossils are isolated parts such as leaves or seeds, which makes it difficult to identify relationships to other isolated parts. Such fossils from the same species are described as morphospecies. "Rosetta Stone" fossils are rare cases of multiple portions of a fossil preserved in connection. The holotype of Paraconcavistylon has been described as a Rosetta Stone fossil as it bears an infructescence attached to branchlet that also has leaves and terminal buds connected, allowing for a fuller plant description than is usually possible. The description of Paleocene trochodendraceous fossils from Wyoming and a phylogenetic analysis of two living and four extinct genera indicated that Concavistylon was not monophyletic. Based on the pendulous nature of "C." wehrii inflorescences, which are distinct from the erect inflorescences of C. kvacekii, the new genus Paraconcavistylon was erected with "C." wehrii as the type species.

- Trochodendraceae
  - Trochodendron
  - - Eotrochion polystylum
    - - - Concavistylon kvacekii
        - - Paraconcavistylon wehrii
          - - Pentacentron sternhartae
            - Tetracentron

Paraconcavistylon wehrii is one of between three and four trochodendraceae species that have been described from the Klondike Mountain Formation. Broadly circumscribed three other species have been identified at Republic, Pentacentron sternhartae, Tetracentron hopkinsii, and Trochodendron nastae. Additionally the species Trochodendron drachukii is known from related Kamloops group shales at the McAbee Fossil Beds near Cache Creek, British Columbia. Manchester et al. 2018B noted that Tr. drachukii is likely the fruits of Tr. nastae, while Pe. sternhartae are likely the fruits of Te. hopkinsii. If fossils of the fruits and foliage in attachment are found, that would bring the species count down to three whole plant taxa.

== Description ==
The fruiting bodies of Paraconcavistylon wehrii are simple racemes that taper from a 3 mm (0.12 in) wide base down to a tip under 1 mm (0.039 in) wide, with lengths of up to and over 17 cm (6.7 in). Fruit capsules are born on 3–5 mm (0.12–0.20 in) pedicels which curve upwards towards the raceme apex in a helical pattern and the longest preserved raceme has 33 attached fruits, though the 10 cm (3.9 in) specimen is missing both basal and apical sections. Given the length of the racemes, they likely hung down like a pendulum, with the fruits pointing downwards. Each of the smooth teardrop shaped fruits is between 5–6 mm (0.20–0.24 in) wide by 5–7 mm (0.20–0.28 in) tall. They have a slight thickening in the basal area where a ring of perianth scars encircling the connection with the pedicel is, but are widest near the fruit apex. Between four and six 1.9–2.9 mm (0.075–0.114 in) long persistent styles are arranged just below the midpoint of the capsules and curving upwards towards the capsule apex. At the base of each style are swollen elliptical bulges that likely were nectaries. The fruits opened at the apex, with a four to six rayed star pattern formed by the dehiscence splits which run from just above the styles to the fruit apex where they join together.

P. wehrii twigs have alternating leaves with terminal and axillary buds. The raceme is born from a fork of the twig and leaf, as are the pointed buds. Typically the axillary buds are around 8 mm (0.31 in) long by 1.8 mm (0.071 in) while the terminal buds are larger at 1 cm (0.39 in) long by 5 mm (0.20 in). Encircling the twig are between five and eight distinct terminal bud scars.

The leaves have a narrow base connecting to the 8–12 mm (0.31–0.47 in) long petioles. They have regularly spaced teeth along the margin that are rounded and bearing glands, and a few specimens from the McAbee site also have distinct laminal lobes bracketing the petiole. The leaves have an overall range between 10.2–12.5 cm (4.0–4.9 in) long by 3.1–3.5 cm (1.2–1.4 in), with an obovate outline. Like Trochodendron the leaves have a pinnate vein structure, with between eight and fifteen secondary veins that fork from the central main vein and arch towards the leaf apex before merging with the secondary above.
