= Trochodendron postnastae =

Trochodendron postnastae Temporal range: Langhian

Scientific classification
- Kingdom: Plantae
- Clade: Tracheophytes
- Clade: Angiosperms
- Clade: Eudicots
- Order: Trochodendrales
- Family: Trochodendraceae
- Genus: Trochodendron
- Species: †T. postnastae

Binomial name
- †Trochodendron postnastae Manchester, Pigg, & DeVore, 2018

Extinct species of flowering plant

Trochodendron postnastae is an extinct species of flowering plant in the family Trochodendraceae. The species is known from fossils found in Middle Miocene deposits of central Oregon. T. postnastae are possibly the leaves belonging to the extinct trochodendraceous fruits Trochodendron rosayi.

== Distribution and paleoenvironment ==
Trochodendron postnastae fossils were found in the Moose Mountain Flora, formerly called the Cascadia flora or Menagerie Wilderness flora, of Linn County, Oregon. The flora is included in the Little Butte Volcanic series outcropping near the town of Cascadia in the central Oregon Cascades. Work on the flora by paleobotanist Jack Wolfe in 1964 gave an estimated age of Early Miocene, this was later revised by Wolfe and Tanai in 1987 to a Late Oligocene estimation. In the descriptive paper naming T. postnastae Manchester et al reported that radioisotope dating of plagioclase crystals collected by Robert Rosé from the fossiliferous horizon of the Moose Mountain flora had been performed. Using crystals obtained from tuffaceous sandstones, Argon–argon dating provided an age of 14.91 ± 0.23 Ma placing the flora as Middle Miocene Langhian stage. T. postnastae is found associated with species such as Acer cascadense, Acer smileyi, Concavistylon kvacekii, Ozakia emryi, and Trochodendron rosayi.

== Taxonomy ==
The species holotype was originally collected during the 1950s by Eleanor Gordon Thompson and donated to the University of California Museum of Paleontology in Berkeley, California as specimen UCMP 201235. An additional series of leaves collected by Robert Rosé and part of the Florida Museum of Natural History's collections in Gainesville, Florida were also studied, but not included in the type series. The fossils were studied by paleobotanists Steven Manchester, Kathleen Pigg, and Melanie DeVore with their 2019 type description being published in the journal Fossil Imprint. The etymology of the specific name postnastae is a reference to the older Ypresian age Trochodendron nastae which it resembles. T. nastae was in turn named as a matronym honoring trochodendralean botanist Charlotte G. Nast.

In addition to T postnastae Manchester et al also provided descriptions of the coeval species Trochodendron rosayi the related trochodendraceous species Concavistylon kvacekii. Based on the similarities of the T. rosayi fruits and T postnastae foliage, and on similar leaf and fruit associations in the older Klondike Mountain Formation of Washington state, Manchester et al considered it possible that the leaves and fruits were produced by the same plant. At the time of description however the two organs had not been found in connection, and so were described under separate names.

== Description ==
The leaves of Trochodendron postnastae are between 7.0–10.2 cm (2.8–4.0 in) long, an acute apex and leaf base which is acute to nearly right-angled. With a maximum lamina width of 2.6–5.3 cm (1.0–2.1 in) the leaves have a length to with ratio of up to 2.7:1 and an elliptical outline. Unlike the older T. nastae leaves which are basally acrodromous with no pinnate secondary veins, T. postnastae leaves are pinnately acrodromous. Two large secondary veins branch from the very base of the primary vein and run parallel to the leaf margin before joining the first pinnate secondary, which is craspedodromous, running from the primary vein to the leaf margin. There are typically three to five sets of pinnate secondaries that are found in the upper portion of the leaves, branching from the midvein at 15–25° angles. Intersecondary veins which run between the secondary veins or the basal secondary veins and the primary vein are common, and series of agrophic veins are sometimes seen on the basal secondaries. The higher order tertiary to quaternary veins form a reticulated polygonal mesh, with areoles that have freely ending veinlets. The margins have fine rounded teeth along the apical edges changing to a smooth margin in the basal 1/3 down to the petiole.
