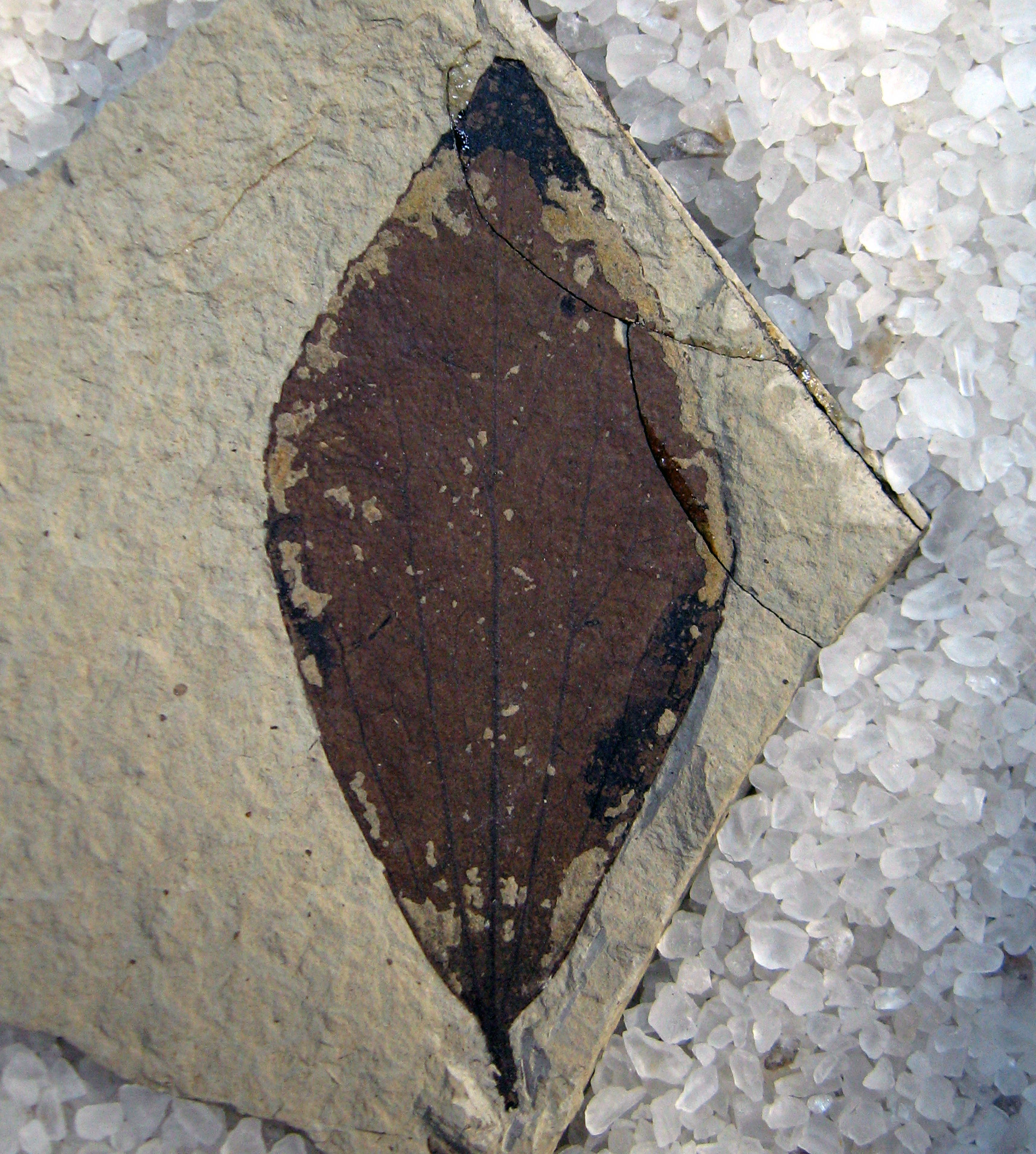
- Trochodendron nastae specimen

Scientific classification
- Kingdom: Plantae
- Clade: Tracheophytes
- Clade: Angiosperms
- Clade: Eudicots
- Order: Trochodendrales
- Family: Trochodendraceae
- Genus: Trochodendron
- Species: †T. nastae

Binomial name
- †Trochodendron nastae Pigg, Wehr, & Ickert-Bond, 2001

Synonyms
- "Eobaileya" Wehr

= Trochodendron nastae =

Trochodendron nastae Temporal range: Early Eocene (Ypresian)51.3–49 Ma

Extinct species of flowering plant

Trochodendron nastae is an extinct species of flowering plant in the family Trochodendraceae related to the modern wheel trees. The species is known from fossil leaves found in early Eocene sites of northern Washington state, United States, and central British Columbia, Canada. The species is included in Trochodendron, with the coeval fruit species T. drachukii from British Columbia suggested to be the fruiting bodies of the species.

== Distribution ==
Trochodendron nastae is known only from sites in the Eocene Okanagan Highlands paleoregion of western North America. The largest collections of leaves have been made from the early Eocene Ypresian stage Klondike Mountain Formation deposits of northern Washington state. An additional pair of leaves have been recovered and reported from the Kamloops Group McAbee Fossil Beds near Cache Creek, British Columbia northwest of Republic.

== History ==
Fossil leaves identified as aff. Trochodendron were first reported by Jack A. Wolfe and Wesley C. Wehr in a Washington Department of Natural Resources Washington Geology article in 1991. The fossils were listed under the form taxon name Eobaileya and part of the "Trochodendroid group" taxa which was also thought to include Cercidiphyllum and its extinct relatives. Eobaileya was again mentioned in the floral list of Wehr and Donald Hopkins when they coined the term "Eocene orchards" in a 1994 Washington Geology . The final appearance of the Eobaileya name came in 1998, with its listing by Wehr in his article in the Contributions to the Paleontology and Geology of the West Coast book honoring V. Standish Mallory.

The formal description of the fossils was authored by Kathleen B. Pigg, Wesley Wehr, and Stefanie Ickert-Bond based on the study of 11 complete and 55 partial compression fossil specimens. They designated "SR 98-02-01" housed in the Stonerose Interpretive Center, the holotype specimen while the paratype series included fossils of the Stonerose and Burke Museum of Natural History collections. They published their 2001 type description of the species in the International Journal of Plant Sciences volume number 162, and named the species nastae in honor of Charlotte G. Nast for her work on extinct and living members of the Trochodendrales.

T. nastae has been placed in the genus Trochodendron based on the overall shape of the leaves, the secondary vein structure, which forms weak chevrons bracing primary veins, and the tertiary veins forming four to five sided cells. However the primary veins are palmate in structure for T.nastae rather than being pinnate as in T. aralioides. T. nastae is one of the oldest members of the genus Trochodendron, which includes the living species T. aralioides, native to Japan, southern Korea and Taiwan

== Taxonomy ==
Trochodendron sp. fruits from Republic.

A second Trochodendron species was named from the McAbee in 2007, based on a well preserved fossil infructescence, which was given the name Trochodendron drachukii. At that time, Pigg and coauthors stated the species, while related to T. nastae was not the same species due to Trochodendraceae leaves also found at McAbee which have a different leaf architecture. However, in 2018 the leaf fossils were officially described in concert with additional specimens from Republic as a part of an entirely new genus and species by paleobotanist Steven Manchester and coauthors. Based on a Republic "rosetta stone" fossil preserving leaves and fruits attached to a branch, the specimens were named Concavistylon wehrii, though the species was later moved to its own monotypic genus Paraconcavistylon in 2020. While discussing the larger Trochodendraceae flora of the Okanagan Highlands Manchester and coauthors suggested the Tr.drachukii fruits, now without a firm foliage fossil counterpart, might indeed belong with the Tr. nastae leaves, as several had been identified from McAbee by that time.

By 2020 the diversity of Trochodendraceae known from the Eocene Okanogan Highlands had expanded to Five named taxa spread between two leaf morphospecies, Tr, nastae and Tetracentron hopkinsii, two fruit morphospecies, Tr. drachukii and Pentacentron sternhartae, plus Pa. wehrii which encompasses both fruits and leaves. Manchester and coauthors suggested the possibility of only three species living in the highlands, with the Tr, nastae leaves plus Tr. drachukii fruits and the Te. hopkinsii leave plus Pe. sternhartae fruits both being "whole plant" nothospecies as seen with Paraconcavistylon wehrii. One additional pair of fossil taxa that are also placed within the Trochodendrales by some paleobotanists are also known from the Eocene Okanagan highlands. The leaf morphogenus Zizyphoides and its fruit morphogenus partner Nordenskioeldia have been found at multiple locations, but not formally described to species as of 2026. Placment of the taxa though is contentious, with some researchers including them in Trochodendraceae while Manchester et al in 2020 suggested they were better treated as stem-group taxa in the order Trochodendrales.

== Description ==
The leaves of Trachodendron nastae are symmetrical and range between elliptical to infrequently obovate in outline. Based on the studied specimens they range in size between 3.0 and 7.7 cm (1.2 and 3.0 in) in total length while the width spans between 1.5 and 4.0 cm (0.59 and 1.57 in). The length to width ratios are 1.4-3.6 to 1 though the average is 2.5 to 1. The petioles are up to 2.8 cm (1.1 in) long by 0.7 to 2.1 mm (0.028 to 0.083 in) wide and have distinct striations. They do not have accompanying stipules as seen occasionally on leaves of Paraconcavistylon. The leaves have a wedge-shape while the apex is described as acuminate. The margins are bisected into a smooth basal region and a scallop toothed apical area.

The leaf texture is thick, and was originally described as coriaceous though no detailed information on the cuticle was presented. The epidermal morphology was later presented in 2018. The dorsal epidermal layer is smooth with equally sized cells of polygonal shape and curved side walls perpendicular to the leaf surface. The ventral epidermis is a mixture of unspecialized cells and stomatal complexes. The unspecialized cells have wavy curving side walls unlike the dorsal cells. The stomatal complexes are possibly of a laterocytic formation, with parallel specialized cells accompanying the guard cells. As seen in living Trochodendron leaves, the fossils lack any trichomes.

In contrast to Trochodendron aralioides, the fossils have a palmate vein pattern with a midvein plus two pairs of lateral primary veins all running from the base upwards through the leaf. The midvein is generally uniform in width along most of its length before becoming wavey near the leaf apex. The inner set of lateral primaries also run most of the leaf length, but near the apex they fork and terminate at tooth tip glands. The outer lateral primaries curve outward and run close to the leaf margin before also branching into marginal teeth. Secondary veins branch off both sets of side primaries and from the midvein. On all the primaries the secondary veins have are alternating in branch placement. The outer secondaries form a looping ladder along marginal area, looping upwards to join the underside of an upper vein. Inner secondaries branch of the primaries at angles between 40° and 45° and combine with intersecondary veins to from a weak chevron pattern. The tertiaries and quaternaries, third order and forth order veins, run between the secondary and intersectiondary veins creating a mesh of four and five-sided aeroles. There are quintaries present but the placement and morphology was not detailed.

== Paleoecology ==
Not much has been reported on the paleoecology of Trochodendron nastae. In the 2001 type description, several specimens were briefly mentioned which hinted at several plant-insect relationships. It was suggested that several fossils showing an enlarged petioles may be showing signs of galling damage. An additional fossil is preserved missing the apical region with the concave incision margins of the damage having a well developed reaction zone. The damage was identified by paleoentomologist Conrad Labandeira of the Smithsonian as external foliage feeding from an unknown insect, indicating T. nastae was host to phytophagous species.

== Paleoenvironment ==
The Republic sites are part of a larger fossil site system collectively known as the Eocene Okanagan Highlands. The highlands, including the Early Eocene formations between Driftwood Canyon at the north and Republic at the south, have been described as one of the "Great Canadian Lagerstätten" based on the diversity, quality and unique nature of the paleofloral and paleofaunal biotas that are preserved. The highlands temperate biome preserved across a large transect of lakes recorded many of the earliest appearances of modern genera, while also documenting the last stands of ancient lines. The warm temperate highland floras in association with downfaulted lacustrine basins and active volcanism are noted to have no exact modern equivalents. This is due to the more seasonally equitable conditions of the Early Eocene, resulting in much lower seasonal temperature shifts. However, the highlands have been compared to the upland ecological islands of the Virunga Mountains within the African rift valleys Albertine Rift.

The Klondike Mountain Formation represents an upland lake system that was surrounded by a warm temperate ecosystem with nearby volcanism dating from during and just after the early Eocene climatic optimum. The Okanagan Highlands likely had a mesic upper microthermal to lower mesothermal climate, in which winter temperatures rarely dropped low enough for snow, and which were seasonably equitable. The paleoforest surrounding the lakes have been described as precursors to the modern temperate broadleaf and mixed forests of Eastern North America and Eastern Asia. Based on the fossil biotas the lakes were higher and cooler then the coeval coastal forests preserved in the Puget Group and Chuckanut Formation of Western Washington, which are described as lowland tropical forest ecosystems. Estimates of the paleoelevation range between 0.7 and 1.2 km (0.43 and 0.75 mi) higher than the coastal forests. This is consistent with the paleoelevation estimates for the lake systems, which range between 1.1 and 2.9 km (1,100 and 2,900 m), which is similar to the modern elevation 0.8 km (0.50 mi), but higher.

Estimates of the mean annual temperature have been derived from climate leaf analysis multivariate program (CLAMP) analysis and leaf margin analysis (LMA) of the Republic paleoflora. The CLAMP results after multiple linear regressions gave a mean annual temperature of approximately 8.0 °C (46.4 °F), with the LMA giving 9.2 ± 2.0 °C (48.6 ± 3.6 °F). A bioclimatic-based estimate based on modern relatives of the taxa found at Republic suggested mean annual temperatures around 13.5 ± 2.2 °C (56.3 ± 4.0 °F). This is lower than the mean annual temperature estimates given for the coastal Puget Group, which is estimated to have been between 15 and 18.6 °C (59.0 and 65.5 °F). The bioclimatic analysis for Republic suggests a mean annual precipitation amount of 115 ± 39 cm (45 ± 15 in).
