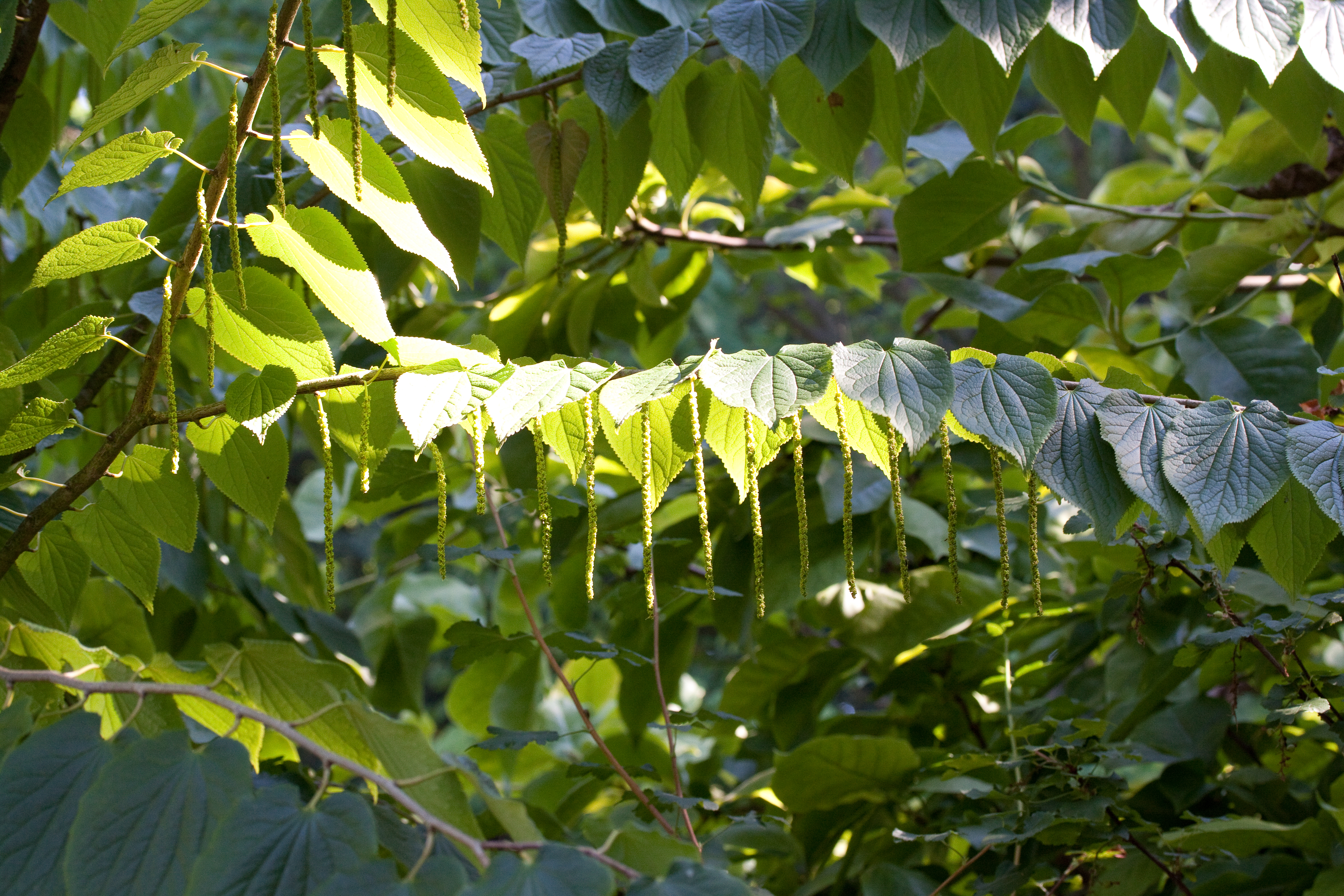
- Tetracentron sinense, leaves and flowers

Conservation status
- CITES Appendix III (CITES)

Scientific classification
- Kingdom: Plantae
- Clade: Tracheophytes
- Clade: Angiosperms
- Clade: Eudicots
- Order: Trochodendrales
- Family: Trochodendraceae
- Genus: Tetracentron
- Species: T. sinense

Binomial name
- Tetracentron sinense Oliv.

= Tetracentron sinense =

Species of tree

Tetracentron sinense is a flowering plant native to Asia and the sole living species in the genus Tetracentron. It was formerly considered the sole species in the family Tetracentraceae, though Tetracentron is now included in the family Trochodendraceae together with the genus Trochodendron.

== Range and habitat ==
It is native to southern China, northern Vietnam and the eastern Himalaya (eastern Nepal, Bhutan, Northeast India, and northern Myanmar), where it grows at altitudes of 1,100–3,500 m (3,600–11,500 ft) along streams and forest margins in broad-leaved evergreen and mixed evergreen-deciduous forests.

== Morphology ==
It is a tree growing to 20–40 m (66–131 ft) tall. The leaves are deciduous (the Flora of China reporting it as evergreen is an error), borne singly at the apex of short spur shoots, each leaf dark green, broad heart-shaped, 5–13 cm (2.0–5.1 in) long and 4–10 cm (1.6–3.9 in) broad, with a rugose surface and a serrated margin. The spur shoots bear one leaf each year, slowly lengthening with each subsequent year.

The flowers are inconspicuous, yellowish green, without petals, produced on slender catkins 10–15 cm (3.9–5.9 in) long; each flower is 1–2 mm (0.039–0.079 in) diameter. The fruit is a follicle 2–5 mm (0.079–0.197 in) diameter, containing 4–6 seeds.

Tetracentron and Trochodendron were described to share the very unusual feature of lacking vessel elements in the wood, something not typical in angiosperms. This has long been considered a very primitive character, resulting in the classification of these two genera in a basal position in the angiosperms; however, molecular phylogenetics research by the Angiosperm Phylogeny Group and others, has shown that these two genera are not basal angiosperms, but related basal eudicots. This suggested that the absence of vessel elements in this group is a secondarily evolved character, not a primitive one. However, a study in 2020 reported that T. sinense has vessel elements and it also has the key genes that regulate vessel formation.

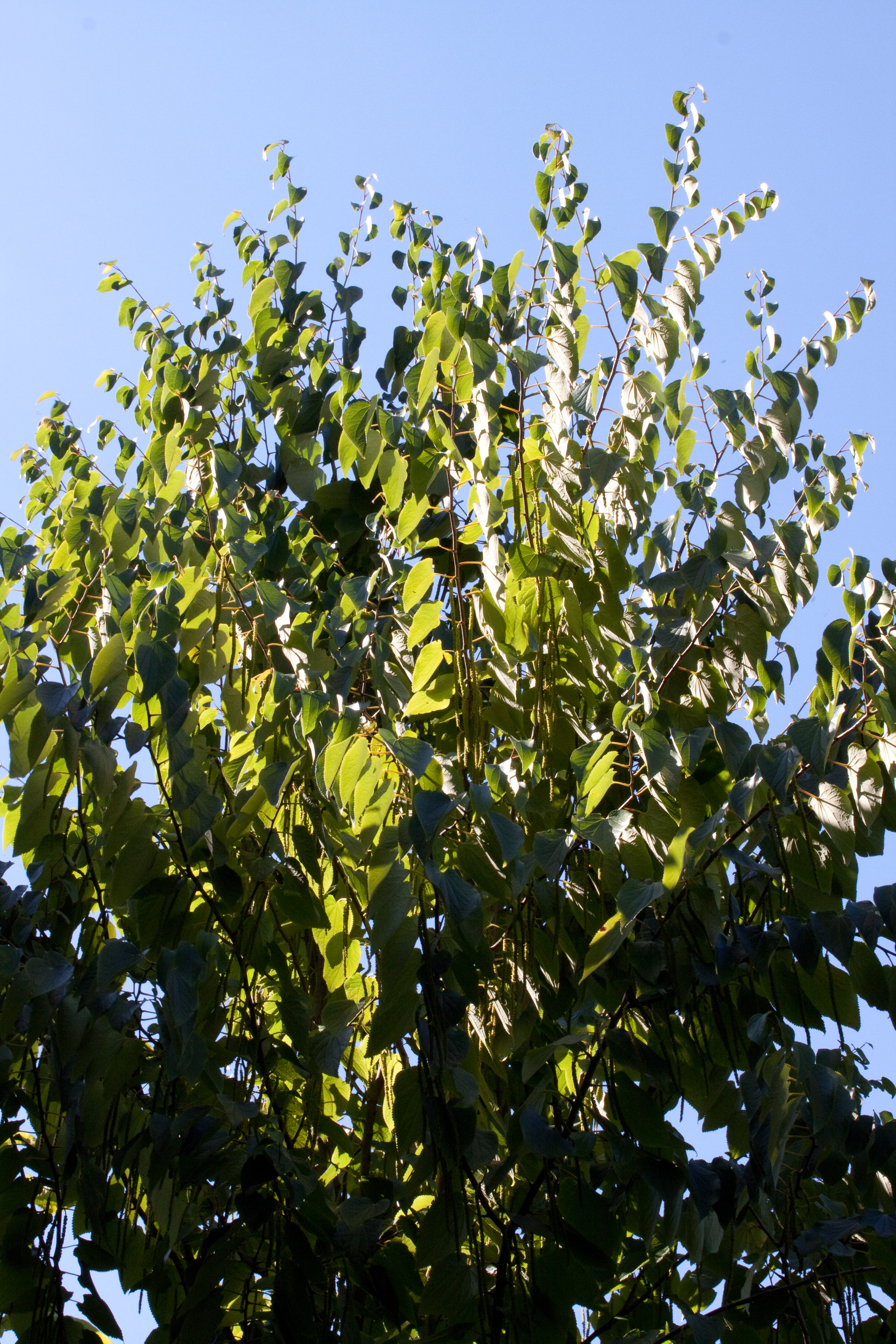
Branches

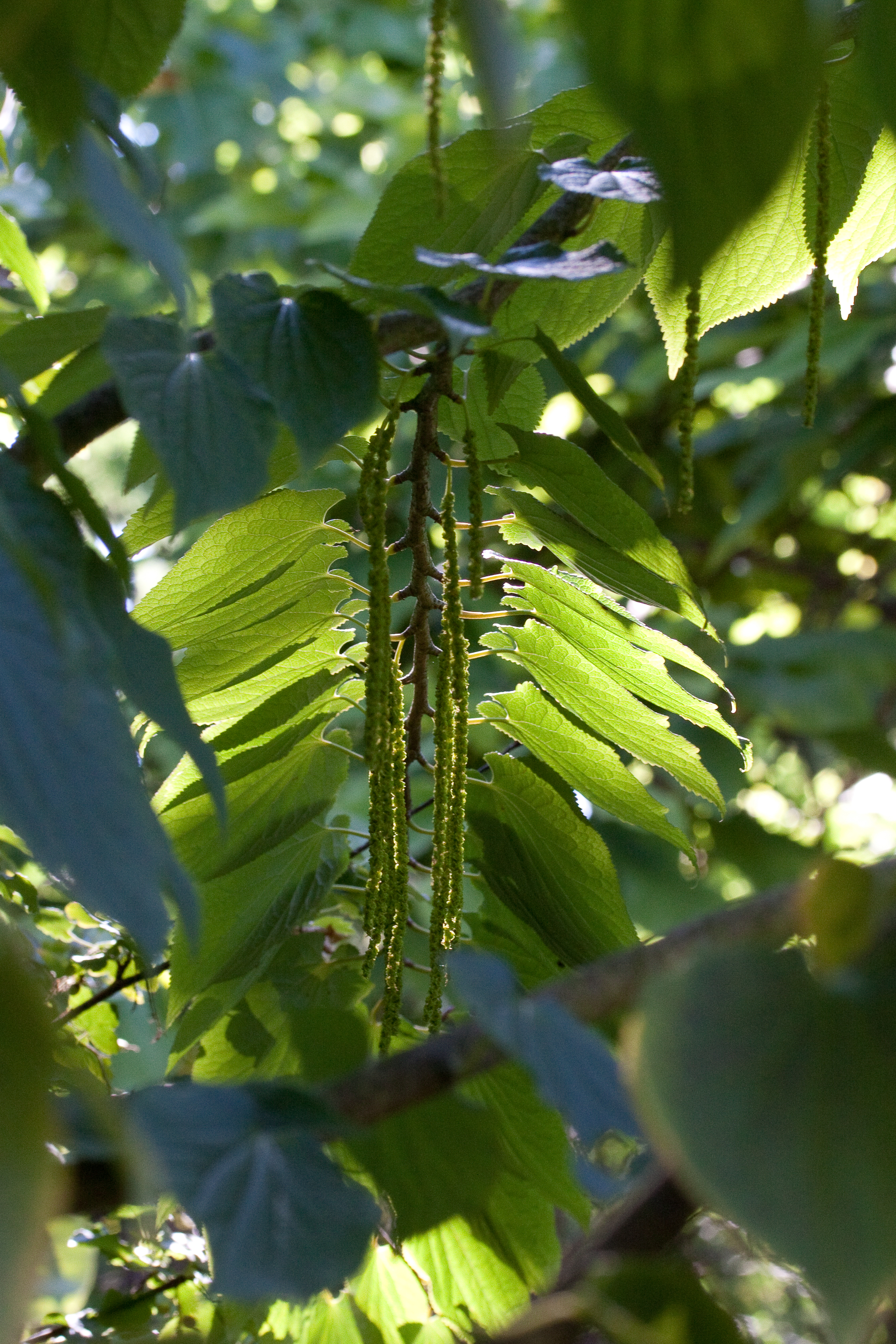
Leaves and flowers

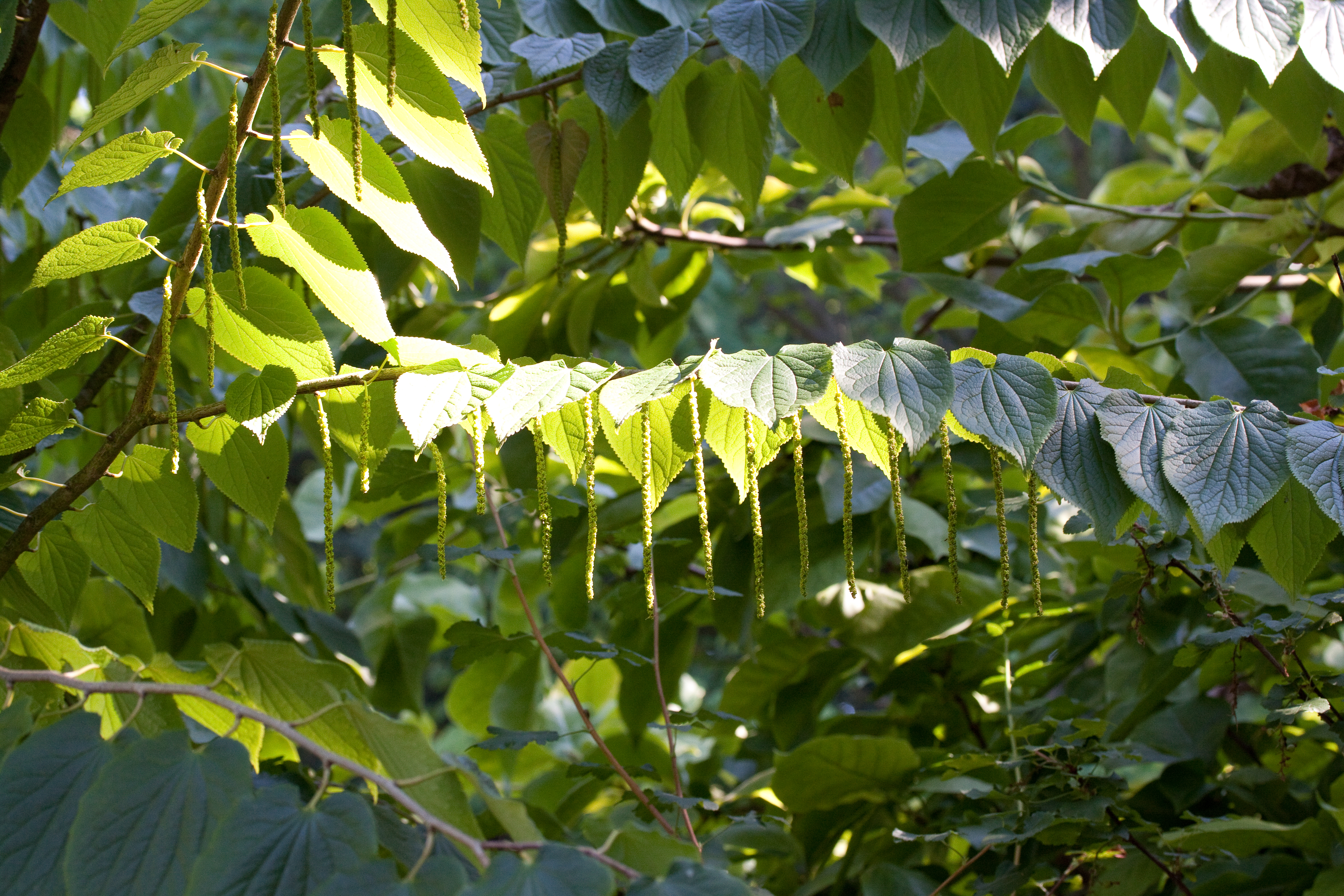
Leaves and flowers

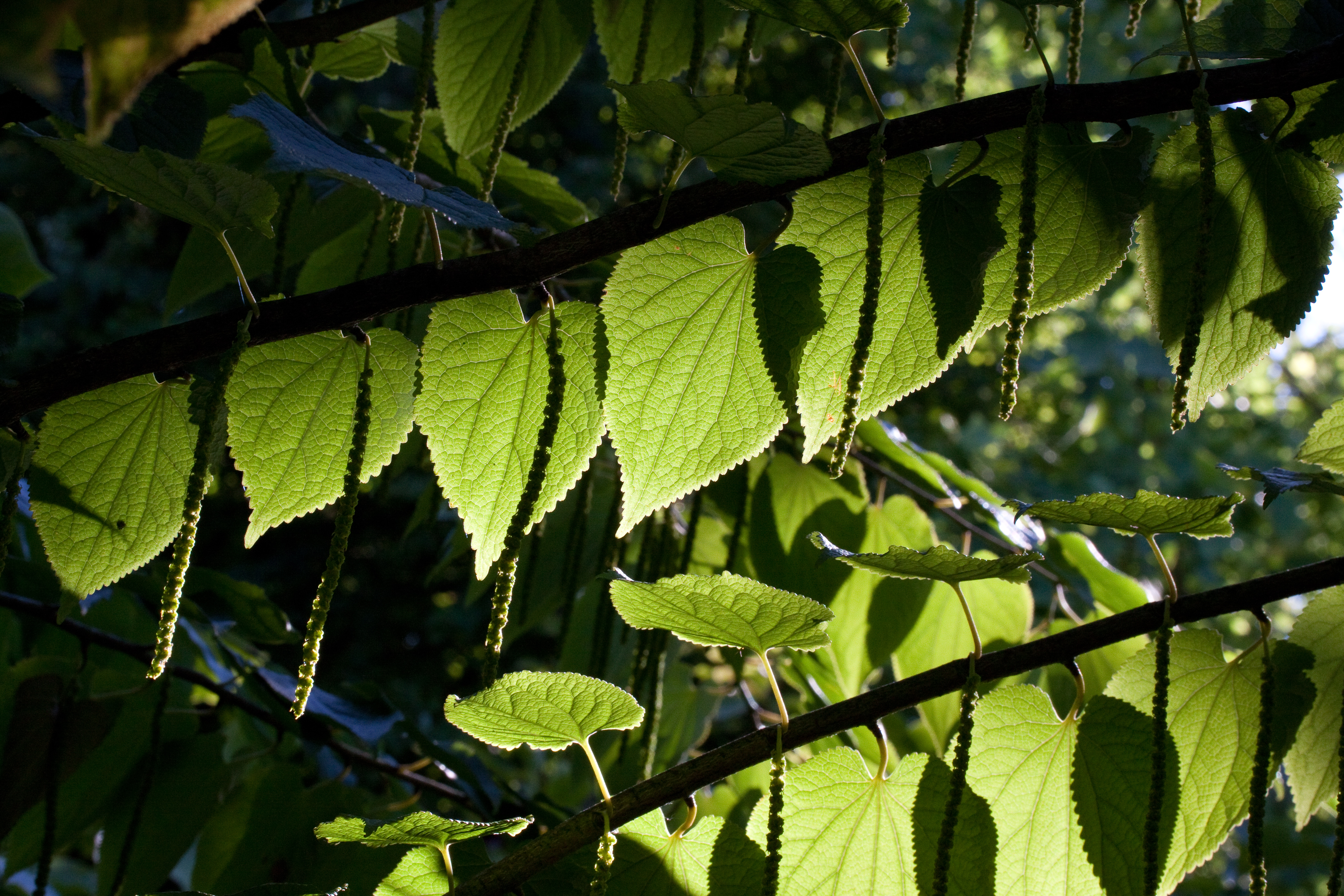
Leaves and flowers

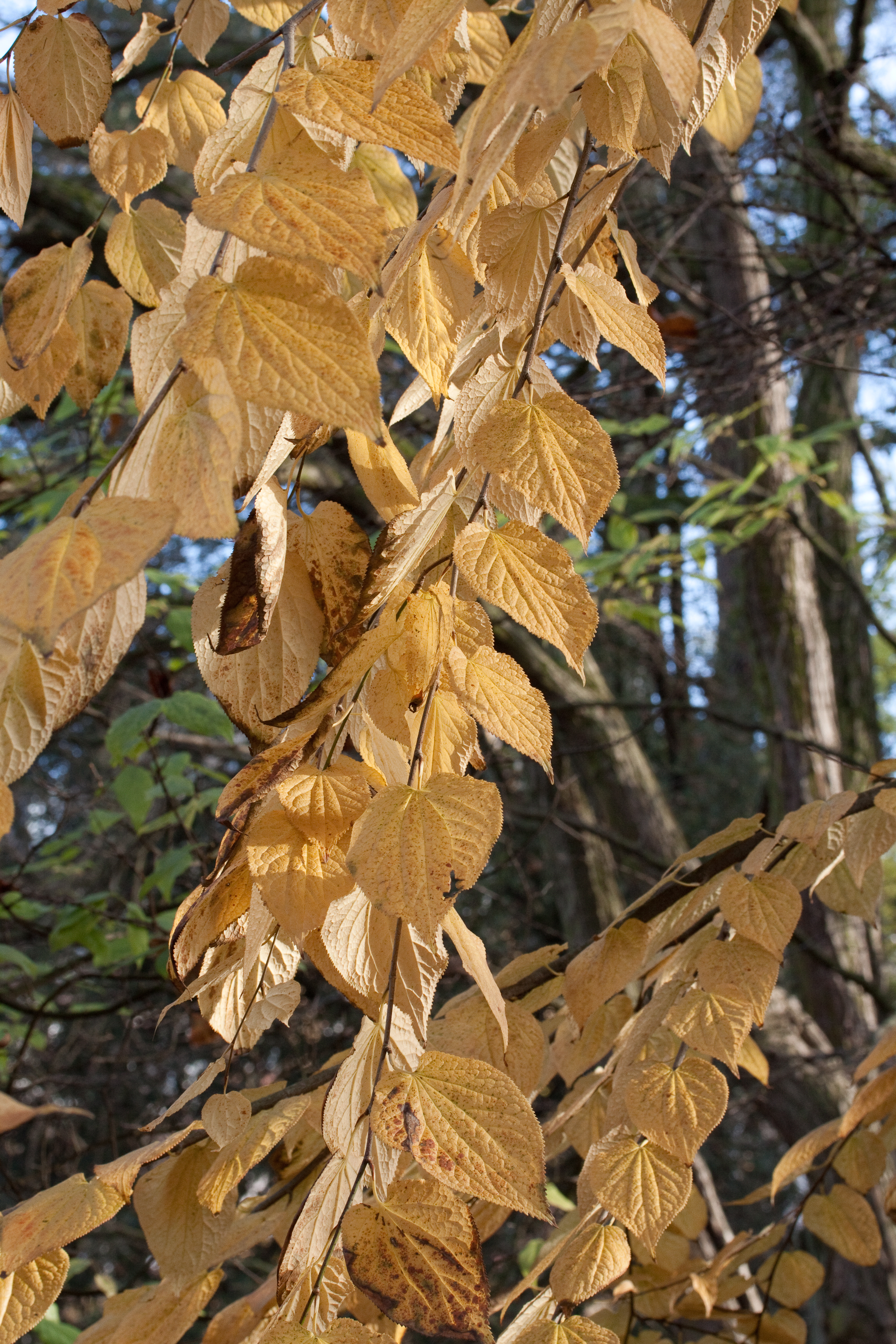
Fall color

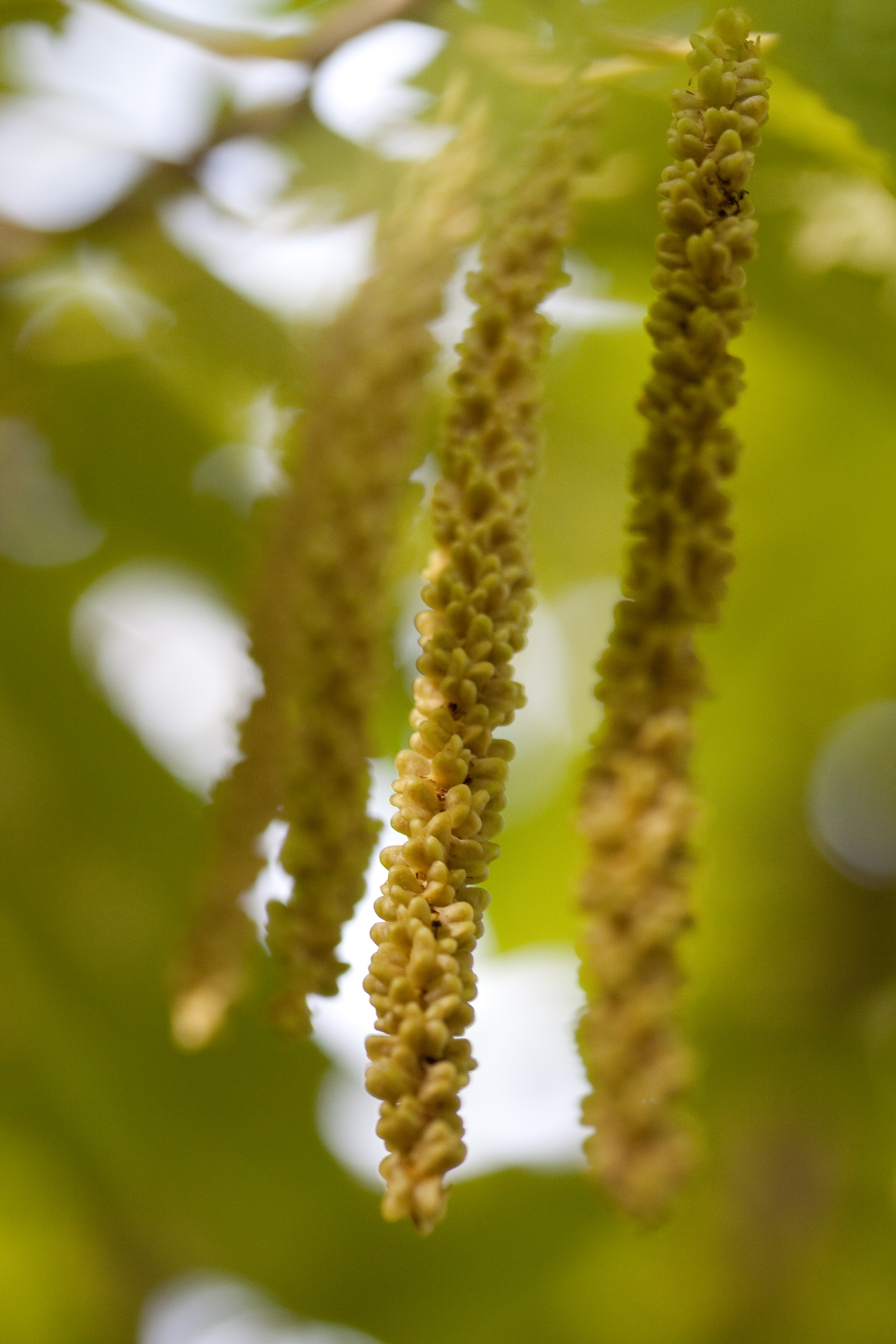
Young seeds

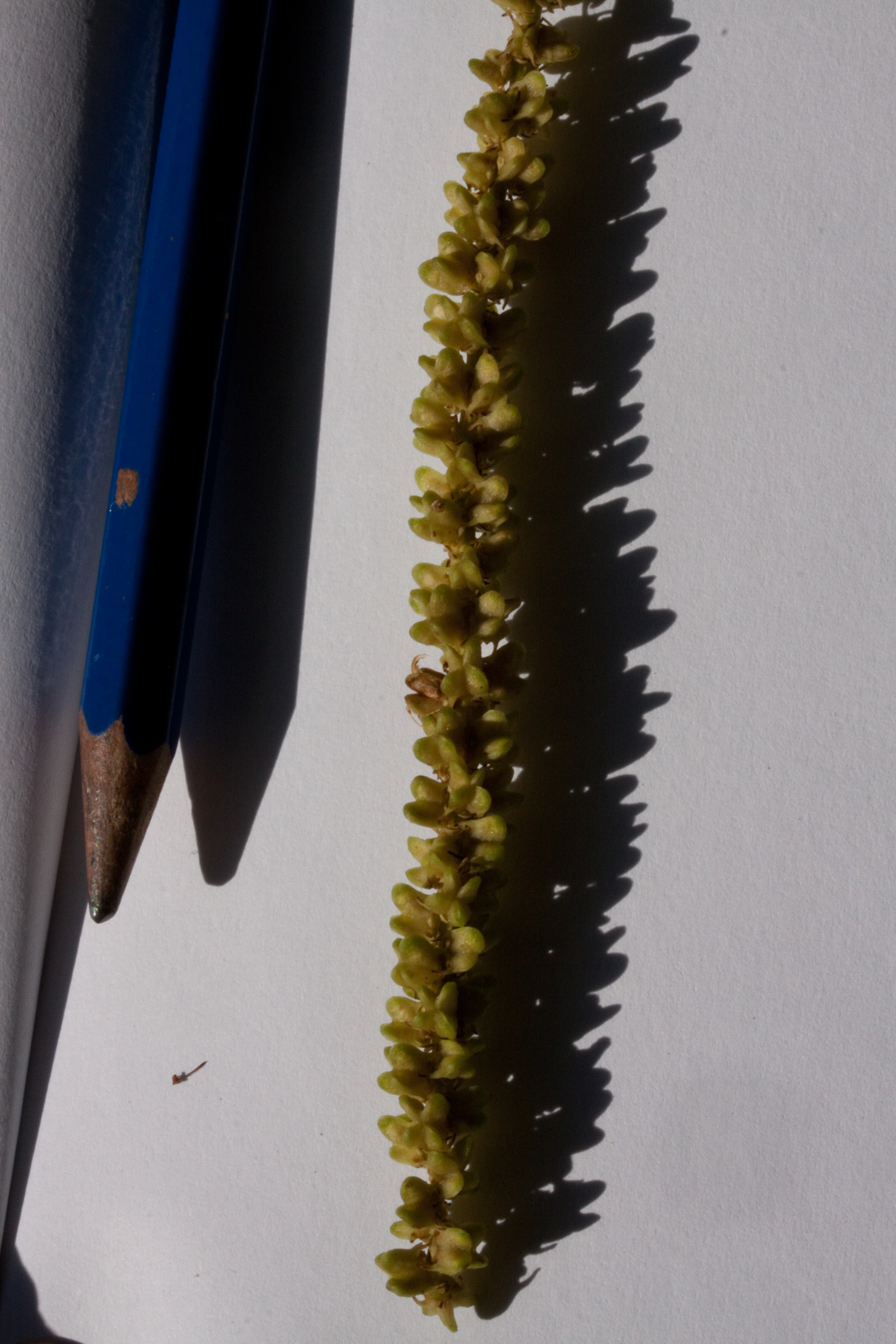
Young seeds
