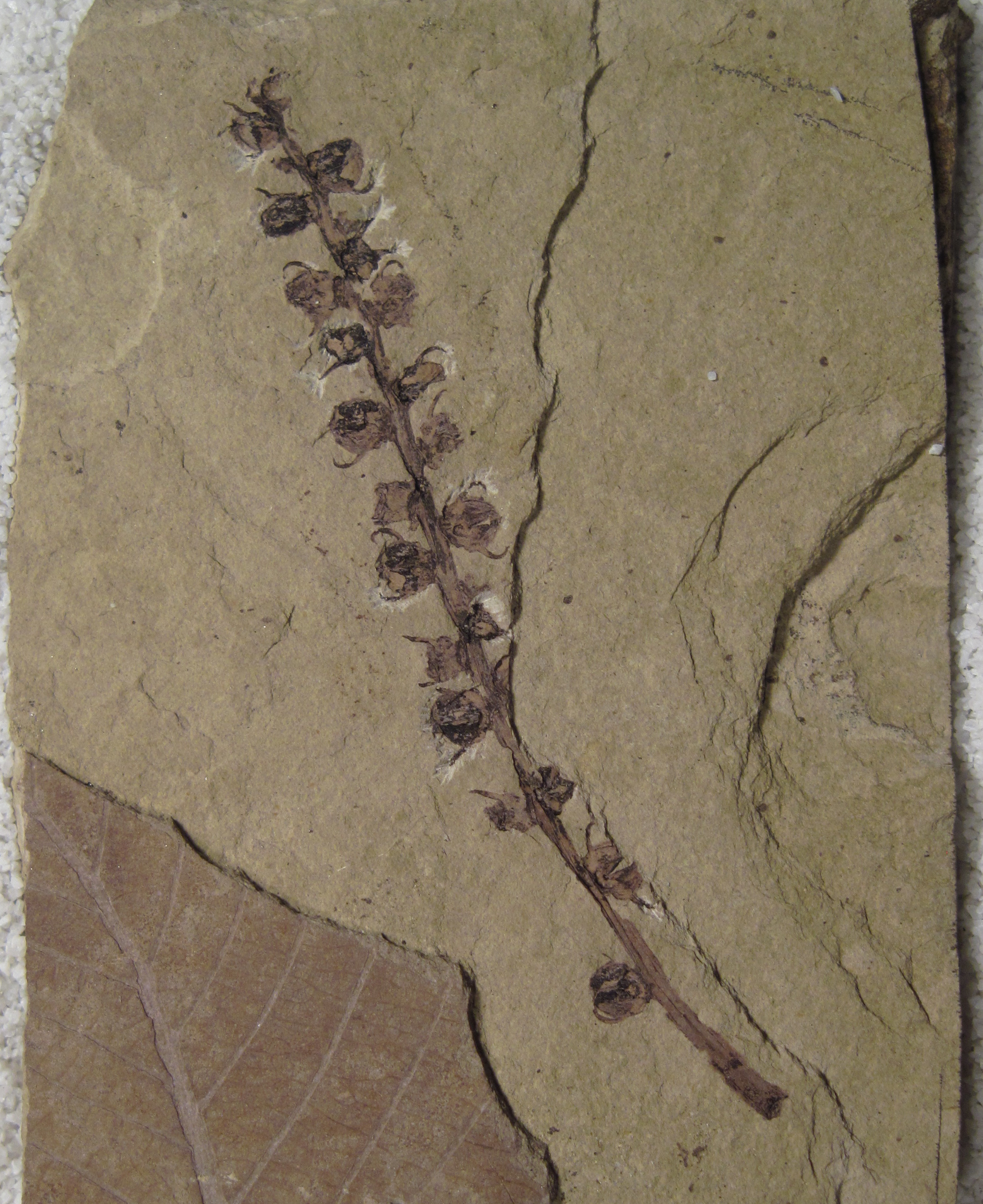
- Holotype infructescence, SR 93-08-02

Scientific classification
- Kingdom: Plantae
- Clade: Tracheophytes
- Clade: Angiosperms
- Clade: Eudicots
- Order: Trochodendrales
- Family: Trochodendraceae
- Genus: †Pentacentron
- Species: †P. sternhartae

Binomial name
- †Pentacentron sternhartae Manchester et al, 2018

= Pentacentron =

Pentacentron Temporal range: Ypresian

Extinct genus of Trochodendralean plant

Pentacentron is an extinct genus of flowering plant in the family Trochodendraceae, consisting of the single species Pentacentron sternhartae. The genus is known from fossil fruits found in the early Eocene deposits of northern Washington state, United States. P. sternhartae are possibly the fruits belonging to the extinct trochodendraceous leaves Tetracentron hopkinsii.

== Distribution and paleoenvironment ==
Pentacentron sternhartae is known from specimens which are recovered from outcrops of the early Eocene, Ypresian Klondike Mountain Formation in Republic. The Klondike Mountain Formation preserves an upland temperate flora which was first interpreted as being microthermal, however further study has shown the flora to be more mesothermal in nature. The plant community preserved in the Klondike Mountain formation is a mixed conifer–broadleaf forest with large pollen elements of birch and golden larch, but also having notable traces of fir, spruce, cypress, and palm.

== Taxonomy ==
The species was described from a type specimen, the holotype Infructescence, number SR 93-08-02, plus a group of eight paratype specimens. At the time of description, type series specimens were preserved in the Stonerose Interpretive Center paleobotanical collections in Republic, Washington. Manchester et al published their 2018 type description of the species in the International Journal of Plant Sciences along with the type description of Paraconcavistylon wehrii. The genus name Pentacentron was coined as a reference to the fruits five-fold symmetry, which is distinct from the fourfold symmetry displayed by extant Tetracentron species. They chose the specific epithet sternhartae as a combined patronym honoring Michael E. Sternberg and matronym honoring Janet L. Hartford of Republic, Washington. Sternberg and Hartford have helped to facilitate the collecting of fossils at Republic, and promoted the research and education of fossils done through the Stonerose Interpretive center.

Pe. sternhartae is one of between three and four trochodendraceae species that have been described from the Klondike Mountain Formation. Broadly circumscribed, three other species have been identified at Republic, Paraconcavistylon wehrii, Tetracentron hopkinsii, and Trochodendron nastae. Additionally the species Trochodendron drachukii is known from related Kamloops group shales at the McAbee Fossil Beds near Cache Creek, British Columbia. Manchester et al 2018 noted that Tr. drachukii is likely the fruits of Tr. nastae, while Pe. sternhartae are likely the fruits of Te. hopkinsii. If fossils of the fruits and foliage in attachment are found, that would bring the species count down to three whole plant taxa.

== Description ==
Pentacentron sternhartae fruiting spikes range between 5.8–9.2 cm (2.3–3.6 in) in length with the fruits arranged long the axis in a helical pattern. Each capsule is sessile on the thin raceme. The capsular heads consist of five fruiting chambers, arranged pentagonally around the midline of the 1.3–1.5 mm (0.051–0.059 in) wide head. Growing from the middle area of each chamber is an apically and inwardly curving persistent style, each with an elliptical nectary bulge at its base. Rimming the base of each fruit are Perianth scars creating a raised flange. The fruits opened apically, through separation lines running from just above the styles up to the fruit tip where they met to form a pentagonal star like opening.
