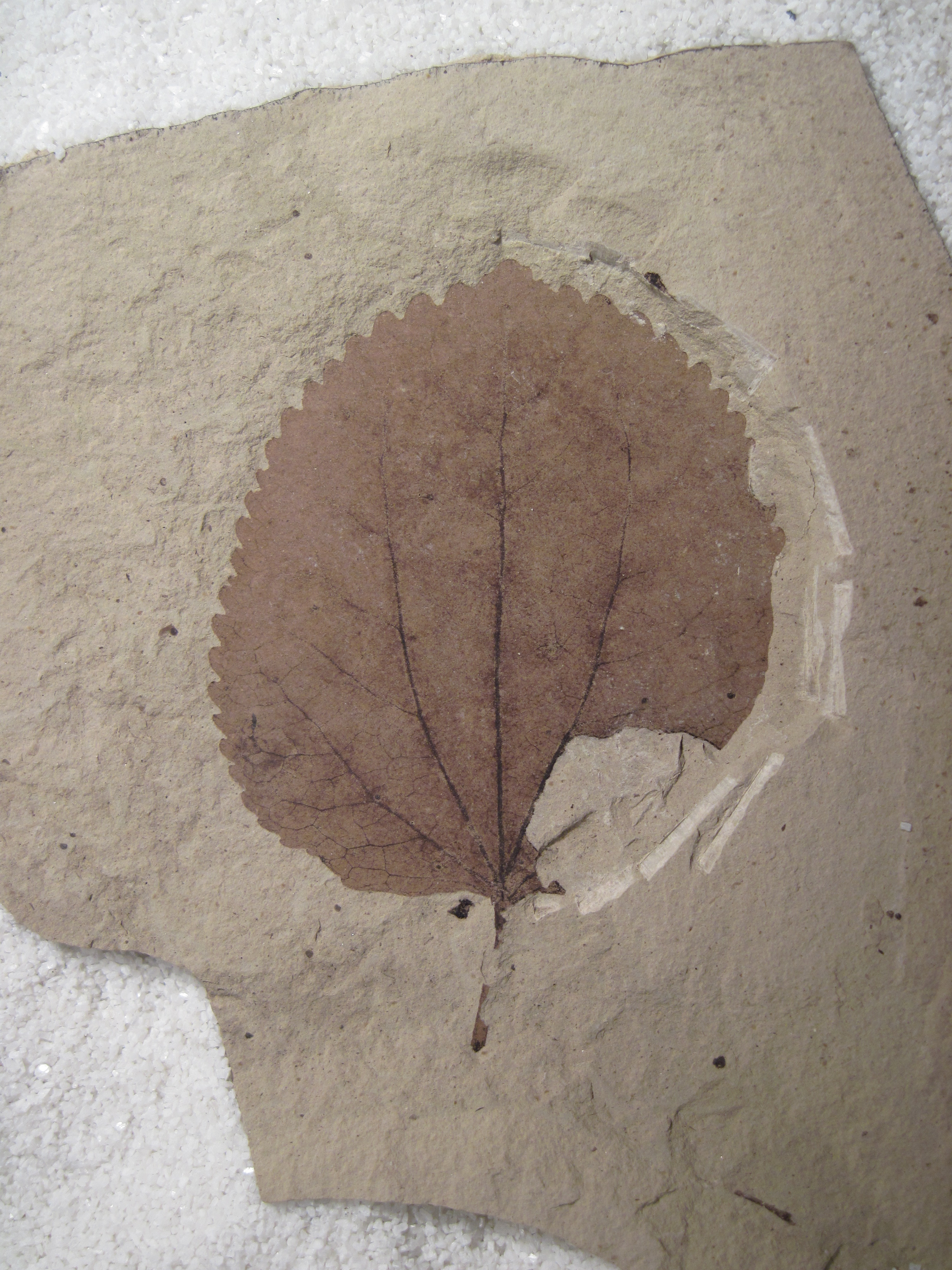
- Fossil leaf, Klondike Mountain Formation

Scientific classification
- Kingdom: Plantae
- Clade: Embryophytes
- Clade: Tracheophytes
- Clade: Spermatophytes
- Clade: Angiosperms
- Clade: Eudicots
- Order: Trochodendrales
- Family: Trochodendraceae
- Genus: Tetracentron
- Species: †T. hopkinsii

Binomial name
- †Tetracentron hopkinsii Pigg et al, 2007

= Tetracentron hopkinsii =

Tetracentron hopkinsii Temporal range: Ypresian

Extinct species of flowering plant

Tetracentron hopkinsii is an extinct species of flowering plant in the family Trochodendraceae. The species is known from fossil leaves found in the early Eocene deposits of northern Washington state, United States and south Central British Columbia. The species was first described from fossil leaves found in the Allenby Formation. T. hopkinsii are possibly the leaves belonging to the extinct trochodendraceous fruits Pentacentron sternhartae.

== Distribution and paleoenvironment ==
Tetracentron hopkinsii was initially described from two leaves, both recovered from the Early Eocene, Ypresian Allenby Formations One Mile Creek outcrop 8 km (5.0 mi) north of Princeton, British Columbia. The one mile creek site is notable for being dominated by fossils of Betula leopoldae though Acer species, Rosaceae species, Tsukada davidiifolia, and Ulmus okanaganensis are also present.

The Allenby Formation preserves an upland temperate flora which was first interpreted as being distinctly microthermal, however further study has shown the flora to be more upper microthermal to lower mesothermal in nature, with few to no days below freezing in a year. Analysis of pollen samples shows plant community preserved at the site was mesic mixed conifer–broadleaf forest, with large pollen elements of birch and golden larch, but also having notable traces of fir, spruce, cypress, and palm. The plants and animals are preserved in a finely layered light greenish-gray lacustrine shale as compression-impression fossils.

Pigg et al noted in 2007 that one leaf assignable to Tetracentron had been found in the Klondike Mountain Formation of Republic, Washington, but was not complete enough to confidently attribute it to T. hopkinsii. The recovery of additional leaves deposited in the Stonerose Interpretive Center allowed Manchester et al to assign the Republic flora specimens to T. hopkinsii in 2018, expanding the confirmed distribution of the species.

== Taxonomy ==
Examination of the species was performed by Kathleen Pigg, Richard Dillhoff, Melanie DeVore and Wesley Wehr based on the study of the holotype "UWBM 54185" and paratype "UWBM 56700ab" leaves. Both specimens were part of the Burke Museum of Natural History and Culture paleobotanical collections at the time of description. Pigg et al published their 2007 type description of the species in the International Journal of Plant Sciences along with the type description of Trochodendron drachukii. They chose the specific epithet hopkinsii as a patronym honoring Donald Q. Hopkins in recognition for his collecting efforts at both the One Mile Creek site and other sites in the Okanagan highlands floras.

Along with the 2008 description of Tetracentron atlanticum from the Mid to Late Miocene of Iceland, Grímsson et al documented and figured Tetracentron pollen recovered from the Princeton Chert locality of the Allenby Formation.

T. hopkinsii is one of between three and four trochodendraceous species that have been described from the Klondike Mountain Formation. Broadly circumscribed, three other species have been identified in the Republic flora, Paraconcavistylon wehrii, Pentacentron sternhartae, and Trochodendron nastae. Additionally the species Trochodendron drachukii is known from related Kamloops group shales at the McAbee Fossil Beds near Cache Creek, British Columbia. Manchester et al 2018 noted that Tr. drachukii is likely the fruits of Tr. nastae, while Pe. sternhartae are likely the fruits of Te. hopkinsii. If fossils of the fruits and foliage in attachment are found, that would bring the species count down to three whole plant taxa.

== Description ==
The elliptical Tetracentron hopkinsii type specimen leaves have a length to width ratio of 1.3:1, being up to 9.5 cm (3.7 in) in length and up to 7.5 cm (3.0 in). The venation is palmate with one thin midvein and two to three sets of lateral primaries which curve upwards towards the apex. The outermost set of lateral primaries are thin, branching off from the midvein at a 90° angle. Conversely the inter one to two sets of lateral primaries are thicker and arch towards the leaf apex. The secondary veins which branch off the midvein are thin, and fork out from the midvein at 32°–40° angles before meeting secondaries from the lateral primaries and forming chevrons. The tertiary veins and quaternary veins are percurrent forking at 60° to 70° angles. The margin has regular teeth formed by a convex basal side and a convex apical side which may divide into a subtooth. A persistent gland is present in the tooth tip and which is supplied by a central vein and two converging lateral veins. The robust 4.3 cm (1.7 in) long petiole starts wide at its base, and gradually thins along its length before meeting the leaf in the center of the cordate leaf base.
