= Trochodendron drachukii =

Trochodendron drachukii Temporal range: Ypresian 49.5 Ma

Scientific classification
- Kingdom: Plantae
- Clade: Tracheophytes
- Clade: Angiosperms
- Clade: Eudicots
- Order: Trochodendrales
- Family: Trochodendraceae
- Genus: Trochodendron
- Species: †T. drachukii

Binomial name
- †Trochodendron drachukii Pigg, Dillhoff, DeVore & Wehr, 2007

Extinct species of flowering plant

Trochodendron drachukii is an extinct species of flowering plants in the family Trochodendraceae known from a fossil fruiting structure found in the early Ypresian age Eocene fossils found in British Columbia, Canada. T. drachukii is one of the oldest members of the genus Trochodendron, which includes the living species T. aralioides, native to Japan, southern Korea and Taiwan and the coeval extinct species T. nastae from Washington state, United States.

== History and classification ==
Description of the new species by Dr. Kathleen Pigg, Richard Dillhoff, Melanie DeVore and Wesley Wehr was based on the study of a single complete fruiting structure specimen. The holotype fossil, number "UWBM 97819", being housed in the Burke Museum of Natural History and Culture, Seattle, Washington. They published their 2007 type description of the species in the International Journal of Plant Sciences volume number 168 and named the species drachukii in honor of Robert Drachuck in recognition for his finding and donation of the type specimen for study. The holotype was recovered from the Ypresian age Tranquille Formation outcropping at the McAbee Fossil Beds near Cache Creek, BC, which is designated the type locality.

Trochodendron drachukii is one of five trochodendraceous species that have been described from the Eocene Okanagan Highlands. Broadly circumscribed, four other species have been identified in the highlands Paraconcavistylon wehrii, Pentacentron sternhartae, Tetracentron hopkinsii and Trochodendron nastae. Manchester et al 2018 noted that Tr. drachukii are likely the fruits of Tr. nastae, while Pe. sternhartae are likely the fruits of Te. hopkinsii. If fossils of the fruits and foliage in attachment are found, that would bring the species count down to three whole plant taxa.

== Description ==
T. drachukii has been placed in the genus Trochodendron based on the morphology of the fruiting structure and overall shape of the fruits. The 11.4 centimetres (4.5 in) long raceme possess 23 distinguishable fruits grouped in twos and threes along the axis. Each fruit is 3–4 millimetres (0.12–0.16 in) by 3–4 millimetres (0.12–0.16 in) and composed of six fused carpels.

Trochodendron shares with Tetracentron the very unusual feature in angiosperms of lacking vessel elements in its wood. This has long been considered a very primitive character, resulting in the classification of these two genera in a basal position in the angiosperms; however, genetic research by the Angiosperm Phylogeny Group has shown it to be in a less basal position (early in the eudicots), suggesting that the absence of vessel elements is a secondarily evolved character, not a primitive one.
