= Acer cascadense =

Acer cascadense Temporal range: Langhian

Scientific classification
- Kingdom: Plantae
- Clade: Tracheophytes
- Clade: Angiosperms
- Clade: Eudicots
- Clade: Rosids
- Order: Sapindales
- Family: Sapindaceae
- Genus: Acer
- Section: Acer sect. Negundo
- Species: †A. cascadense

Binomial name
- †Acer cascadense Wolfe & Tanai, 1987

Extinct species of maple

Acer cascadense is an extinct maple species in the family Sapindaceae described from a series of isolated fossil samaras. The species is known from fossils found in Middle Miocene deposits of central Oregon. It is one of several extinct species placed in the living Acer section Negundo.

== Distribution and paleoenvironment ==
Acer cascadense fossils were found in the Moose Mountain Flora, formerly called the Cascadia flora or Menagerie Wilderness flora, of Linn County, Oregon. The flora is included in the Little Butte Volcanic series outcropping near the town of Cascadia in the central Oregon Cascades. Work on the flora by paleobotanist Jack Wolfe in 1964 gave an estimated age of Early Miocene, this was later revised by Wolfe and Tanai in 1987 to a Late Oligocene estimation. In the descriptive paper naming T. postnastae Manchester et al reported that radioisotope dating of plagioclase crystals collected by Robert Rosé from the fossiliferous horizon of the Moose Mountain flora had been performed. Using crystals obtained from tuffaceous sandstones, Argon–argon dating provided an age of 14.91 ± 0.23 Ma placing the flora as Middle Miocene Langhian stage. Acer cascadense is found associated with extinct species including A. smileyi, Concavistylon kvacekii, Ozakia emryi, Trochodendron postnastae, and Trochodendron rosayi.

== Taxonomy ==
The species holotype helicopter was originally collected during the 1950's by Eleanor Gordon Thompson and donated to the University of California Museum of Paleontology in Berkeley, California as specimen UCMP 9055. Several additional helicopter fossils were identified in the National Museum of Natural History paleobotany collections, and described as paratypes. The specimens were studied by paleobotanists Jack A. Wolfe of the United States Geological Survey, Denver office and Toshimasa Tanai of Hokkaido University. Wolfe and Tanai published their 1987 type description for A. cascadense in the Journal of the Faculty of Science, Hokkaido University. The etymology of the chosen specific name cascadense is in reference to the type locality, known at the time as the Cascadia flora, which is in the Northern Oregon Cascade Mountains.

== Description ==
A. cascadense samaras have a 1.0–1.1 cm (0.39–0.43 in) elliptical long nutlet that is moderately inflated. The base of the fruit has a 0.3–0.4 cm (0.12–0.16 in) attachment scar and a 35° to 50° attachment angle for the opposite fruit in the samara pair. A series of up to six veins arise from the attachment scar and run parallel across the nutlet towards the contact between wing and nutlet. The overall length of the samara wing is between 1.7–2.1 centimetres (0.67–0.83 in) with a maximum width of 0.9 centimetres (0.35 in). The lower edge of the wing is a smooth convex curve angling out from the basal sulcus up to the narrow rounded wing tip, while the upper edge of the wing is straight from nutlet to wing tip. Four to five veins branch from the proximal edge of the wing at 10° to 30° angles and from convex arcs along the wing, forking and frequently anastomising.
