= Charlotte Georgia Nast =

American botanist

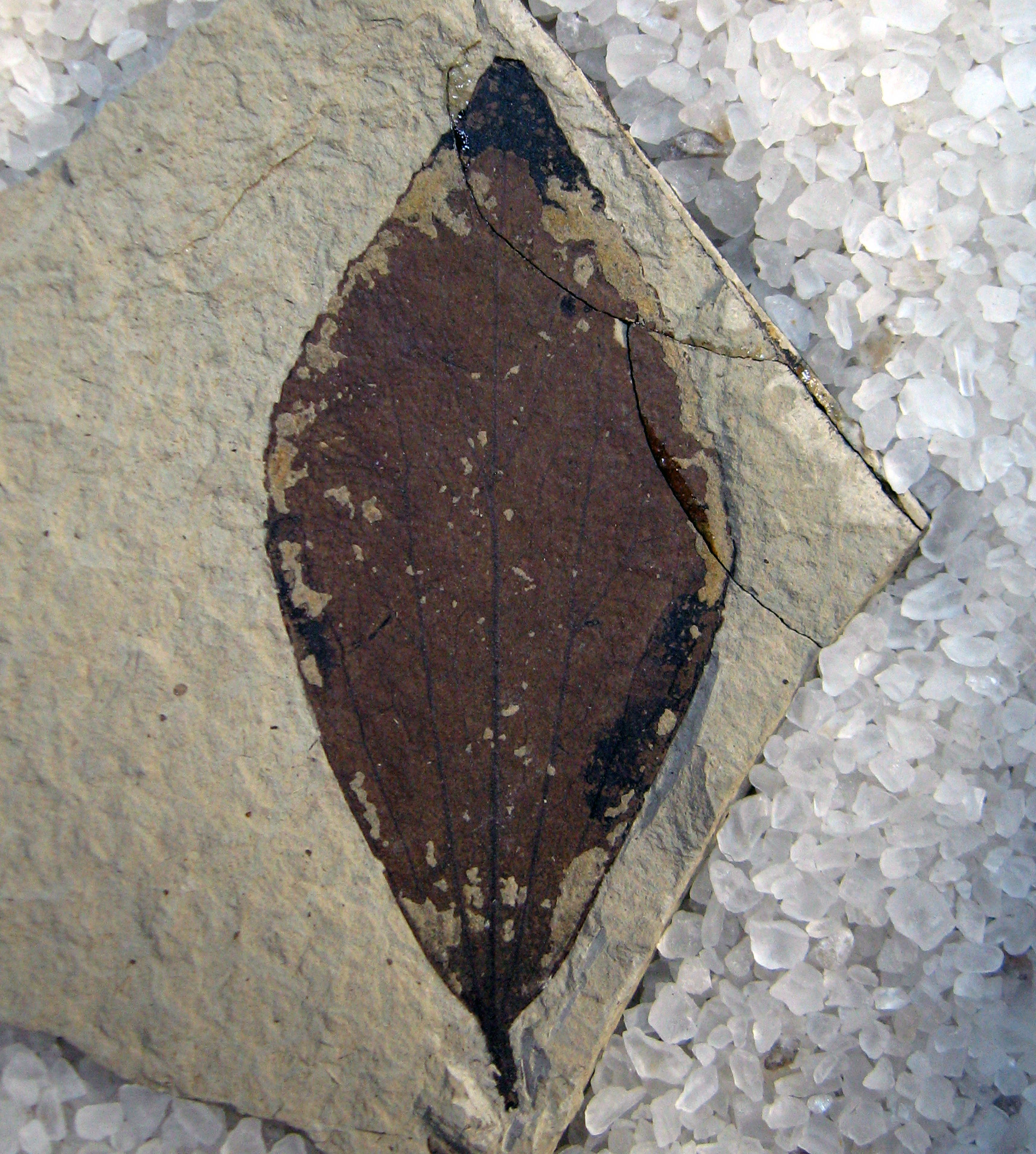
Trochodendron nastae

Charlotte Georgia Nast (1905-1991) was an American botanist and mycologist noted for her work as Curator of the Wood Anatomy Laboratory at Harvard University. Nast received her PhD in botany from the University of California, Berkeley in 1938. The fossil Trochodendron species T. nastae was named in honor of Nast. The standard author abbreviation Nast is used to indicate this person as the author when citing a botanical name.

== Works ==
- Nast, Charlotte Georgia (1929). Some cytological studies of Sordaria anserina. University of Wisconsin--Madison.
- Nast, Charlotte Georgia (1935). Morphological Development of the Fruit of Juglans Regia. University of California.
- Nast, Charlotte Georgia (1938). The Embryogeny and Seedling Morphology of Juglans Regia. University of California.
