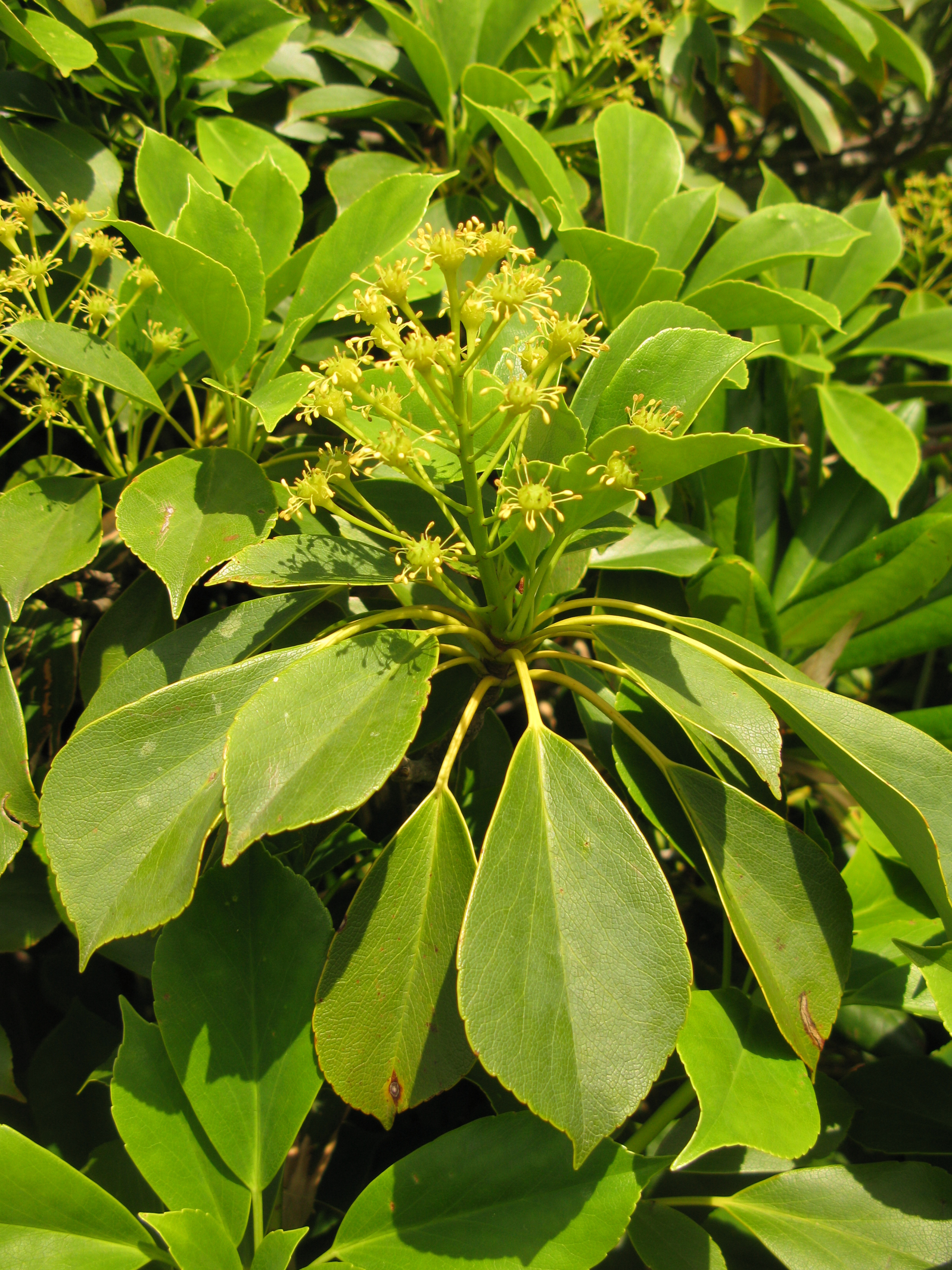
- Trochodendron aralioides

Scientific classification
- Kingdom: Plantae
- Clade: Tracheophytes
- Clade: Angiosperms
- Clade: Eudicots
- Order: Trochodendrales; Takhtajan ex Cronquist
- Family: Trochodendraceae; Eichler

Genera
- †Concavistylon; †Eotrochion; †Nordenskioeldia; †Paraconcavistylon; †Pentacentron; Tetracentron Oliv.; Trochodendron Siebold & Zucc. (wheel tree); †Zizyphoides

= Trochodendraceae =

Trochodendraceae Temporal range: Paleocene–Recent

Family of flowering plants

Trochodendraceae is the only family of flowering plants in the order Trochodendrales. It comprises two extant genera, each with a single species along with up to five additional extinct genera and a number of extinct species. The living species are native to south east Asia. The two living species (Tetracentron sinense and Trochodendron aralioides) both have secondary xylem without vessel elements, which is quite rare in angiosperms. As the vessel-free wood suggests primitiveness, these two species have attracted much taxonomic attention.

== Description ==
Tetracentron and Trochodendron are deciduous or evergreen trees, which grow to between 20 and 30 m (66 and 98 ft) tall, with Trochodendron sometimes sporting umbrella-shaped branches.

- Leaves in spirals at the end of the branches (umbrella-like appearance, Trochodendron) or separate (Tetracentron), simple, serrulate or crenulate, with chloranthoid teeth, palmately or pinnately divided, brochidodromous or actinodromous, ovate or obovate, with a cordate to cuneate base and acuminate apex, stalked, with thin stipules fused with the petiole (Tetracentron) or absent (Trochodendron). Idioblasts present, large, branched, sclerenchymatous in Trochodendron and secretory in Tetracentron. Stomata laterocytic or cyclocytic, hypostomatic.
- Stems without xylematic vessels, with tracheids, xylem rays heterogeneous, uni- and multi-seriate, branches clearly differentiated in unifoliate brachyblasts and macroblasts with distichous phyllotaxis (Tetracentron), with nodes (1-)3(-multi)-lacunar, with (1)3(−7) leaf stems.
- Hermaphroditic or androdioecious plants.
- Terminal Inflorescence in erect, aggregated racemiforms (botryoid or small panicles) (Trochodendron) or defined, axillary, multi-floral amentoid spikes with the flower in whorls of 4 (Tetracentron). Bracts and bracteoles present or absent.
- Perfect flowers, actinomorphic or dissymmetric, yellowish. Short, sub-conical, or hollow receptacle. Hypogynous disk absent. Reduced, very thin perianth, of 4 tepals in 2 decussate whorls (Tetracentron), or at most in a recognizable preantheric state (Trochodendron). Androecium of 4 decussate stamens in pairs of 40–70 in a spiral, non-versatile, basifixed, tetrasporangial, latrorso, apiculate anthers, dehiscence along 2 longitudinal valves in the theca. Gynoecium superior (Tetracentron) to slightly semi-inferior (Trochodendron), of 4–11(−17) carpels, syncarpous (alternating with the stamens in Tetracentron) to semicarpous, the dorsal part of the ovary expanded horizontally in the anthesis, abaxially nectariferous, with sunken stomata, free styles (stylodious), dry, papillose, decurrent ventral stigmas, 5–30 anatropous, apotropous, bitegmicous, crassinucelate, pendulous ovules per carpel, placentation marginal in 2 series or apicoaxial.
- Fruit in ventricidal or slightly loculicidal capsule or an aggregate of dorsally and ventrally dehiscent semicarpical follicles, with basal and external styles.
- Small, flattened, tapered seeds, 3–4 mm in length, with lateral, apical, chalazal wings, with thin testa, with abundant, oily and proteinaceous endosperm, small embryo, with 2 cotyledons.
- Pollen in small, granular, spheroidal, tricolpate, tectated-columelliform monads (10–20 μm in diameter), the surface with interwoven bars parallel to the edges of the colpus, which are granular.
- Chromosomal number: 2n = 48 in Tetracentron and 2n = 38, 40 in Trochodendron.

== Ecology ==
Pollination is probably myriophyllous, even though Tetracentron shows a clear anemophilous syndrome. The pulverulent seeds are dispersed by the wind (anemochory). Trochodendron is present in both protandrous and protogynous forms that are self-compatible.

The plants are found in wooded formations, Trochodendron between 300 m and 2.700 m above sea level and Tetracentron between 1.100 m and 3.600 m above sea level.

== Phytochemistry ==
Flavonoids (quercetin and kaempferol) and proanthocyanidins (cyanidin and delphinidin) are present. Epicuticular waxes are basically composed of nonacosan-10-ol. Tetracentron contains chalcones or dihydrochalcones. Trochodendron contains myricetin. Ellagic acid is absent.

== Fossils ==
Trochodendron and the fossil genus Eotrochion are known from the Paleocene of Wyoming, which constitute the oldest records of the family.

A diverse assemblage of trochodendraceous species have been described from the Eocene Okanagan Highlands in British Columbia and Northeastern Washington. The monotypic genera Paraconcavistylon and Pentacentron are accompanied by Tetracentron hopkinsii and the Trochodendron infructescence morphospecies Tr. drachukii plus the foliage morphospecies Tr. nastae.

The fruit and wood genus Nordenskioeldia, along with the associated leaf morphogenus Zizyphoides have been considered part of Trochodendraceae, though phylogenetic analysis by Manchester et al (2020) suggested they might be better placed as a basal stem lineage in the Trochodendrales, rather than as a crown group member of the family Trochodendraceae.

== Systematic position ==
The Trocodendraceae are a group of flowering plants that include the clade Eudicotyledoneae. In previous systems they have been related with the Cercidiphyllaceae and the Eupteleaceae, with which they share some characteristics that can be considered symplesiomorphic or convergent and that have been excluded from the order Trochodendrales because of molecular data leaving the Trocodendraceae isolated. Based on molecular and morphological data, the APW (Angiosperm Phylogeny Website) considers that it constitutes the only family in the Order Trochodendrales (cf. AP-website).

== Classification ==
The current classification of Trochodendraceae is the APG IV system published in 2016, which maintains the circumscription of Trochodendraceae used in the APG III system published in October 2009. Unlike the APG and APG II systems, the later systems place the family as the only family in the order Trochodendrales. They also includes Tetracentron, synonymizing Tetracentraceae fully with Trochodenraceae.

The APG II system, of 2003 retained the classification used in the 1998 APG system recognizing Trochodendraceae as a family. APG and APG II did not place the family in an order, leaving it among the basal lineages of the eudicots. Both APG systems accepts this as a family of two modern species, but it does allow the option of separating out the family Tetracentraceae.

This segregation would lead to two families with one species each: Tetracentraceae with Tetracentron sinense and Trochodendraceae with Trochodendron aralioides.

The Cronquist system, of 1981, accepted both Trochodendraceae and Tetracentraceae as families and placed these in the order Trochodendrales, in subclass Hamamelidae, in class Magnoliopsida.

== Taxa included ==
The family includes two living genera with very different morphological characteristics:

- Palmate leaves, with stipules, deciduous. Perianth of 4 tepals. Stamens 4. Carpels 4. Ovules 5–6 per carpel. Axillary inflorescence in amentoid spike.

Tetracentron Oliv., 1889. North-east India, Nepal, Bhutan, Burma, western and central China, Vietnam.

- Pinnate leaves, without stipules, evergreen. Perianth absent. Stamens 40–70. Carpels (4-)6–11(−17). Ovules 15–30 per carpel. Terminal racemiform inflorescence, erect.

Trochodendron Siebold & Zucc., 1839. Japan, Taiwan, Korea.
