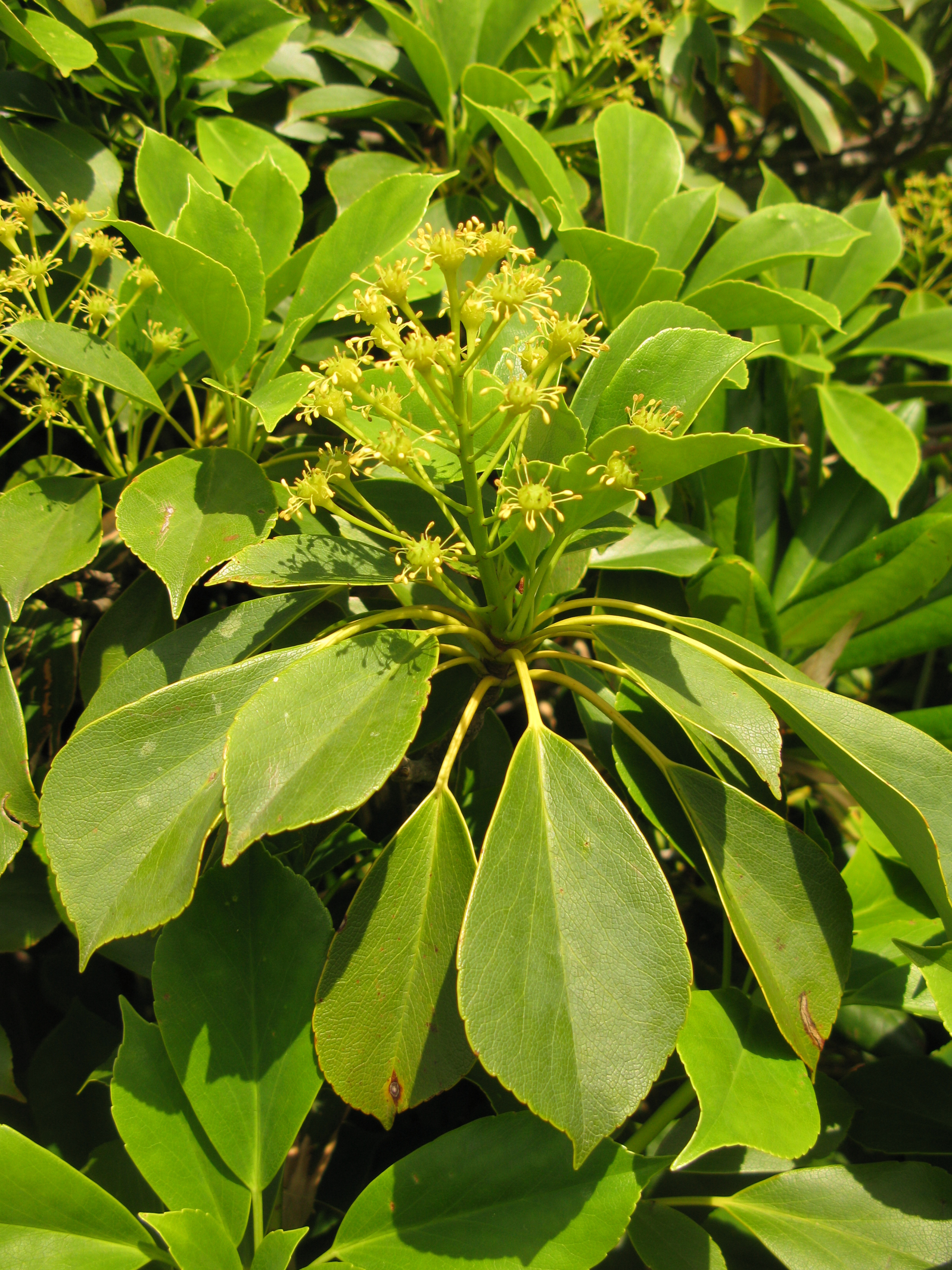

Scientific classification
- Kingdom: Plantae
- Clade: Tracheophytes
- Clade: Angiosperms
- Clade: Eudicots
- Order: Trochodendrales
- Family: Trochodendraceae
- Genus: Trochodendron
- Species: T. aralioides

Binomial name
- Trochodendron aralioides Siebold & Zucc.

= Trochodendron aralioides =

Species of tree

Trochodendron aralioides, sometimes colloquially called wheel tree, is a flowering plant and the sole living species in the genus Trochodendron, which also includes several extinct species. It was also often considered the sole species in the family Trochodendraceae, though botanists now include the distinct genus Tetracentron in the same family. T. aralioides is native to Japan, southern Korea and Taiwan. It grows in lower temperate montane mixed forests in Japan, and broad-leaved evergreen forest in the central mountain ranges and northern parts of Taiwan.

== Description ==
It is an evergreen tree or large shrub growing to 20 m tall. The leaves are borne in tight spirals at the apex of the year's growth, each leaf leathery dark green, simple broad lanceolate, 6–14 cm long and 3–8 cm broad, with a crenate margin. The flowers are produced 10–20 together in a racemose cyme 5–13 cm diameter; each flower is 15–18 mm diameter, yellowish green, without petals, but with a conspicuous ring of 40–70 stamens surrounding the 4–11 carpels. The fruit is 2 cm diameter, woody, star-shaped, composed of 4–11 follicles, each follicle containing several seeds.

== Genetics ==
Trochodendron aralioides shares with Tetracentron the very unusual feature in angiosperms, of lacking vessel elements in its wood. This has long been considered a very primitive character, resulting in the classification of these two genera in a basal position in the angiosperms; however, genetic research by the Angiosperm Phylogeny Group has shown it to be in a less basal position (early in the eudicots), suggesting the absence of vessel elements is a secondarily evolved character, not a primitive one.

From sequencing the chromosome scale (19 chromosomes and 1.614 Gb in size) genome of the species it was seen that the divergence time between T. aralioides and its common ancestor with the core eudicots was ~124.2 Mya.
