= Stonerose Interpretive Center =

Museum in Republic, Washington

Stonerose Interpretive Center and Eocene Fossil Site
- Interpretive center c. 2021

- Location of Republic, Washington
- Named after: Rose family fossils found at the site
- Founded: 1989
- Founder: Wes Wehr, Bert Chadick, Madeline Perry, Gary Anderson, Richard Slagle, Klifton Frazier
- Legal status: 501c(3)
- Purpose: Eocene fossils of Northern Ferry County
- Location: Republic, Washington, United States
- Coordinates: 48°38′52″N 118°44′22″W
- Key people: Travis Wellman, Director
- Parent organization: Friends of Stonerose Fossils
- Employees: 3
- Website: https://stonerosefossil.org/

The Stonerose Interpretive Center & Eocene Fossil Site is a 501c(3) non-profit public museum and fossil dig located in Republic, Washington. The center was established in 1989 and houses fossils that have been featured in National Geographic Magazine, Sunset magazine, and numerous scientific works.

== History ==
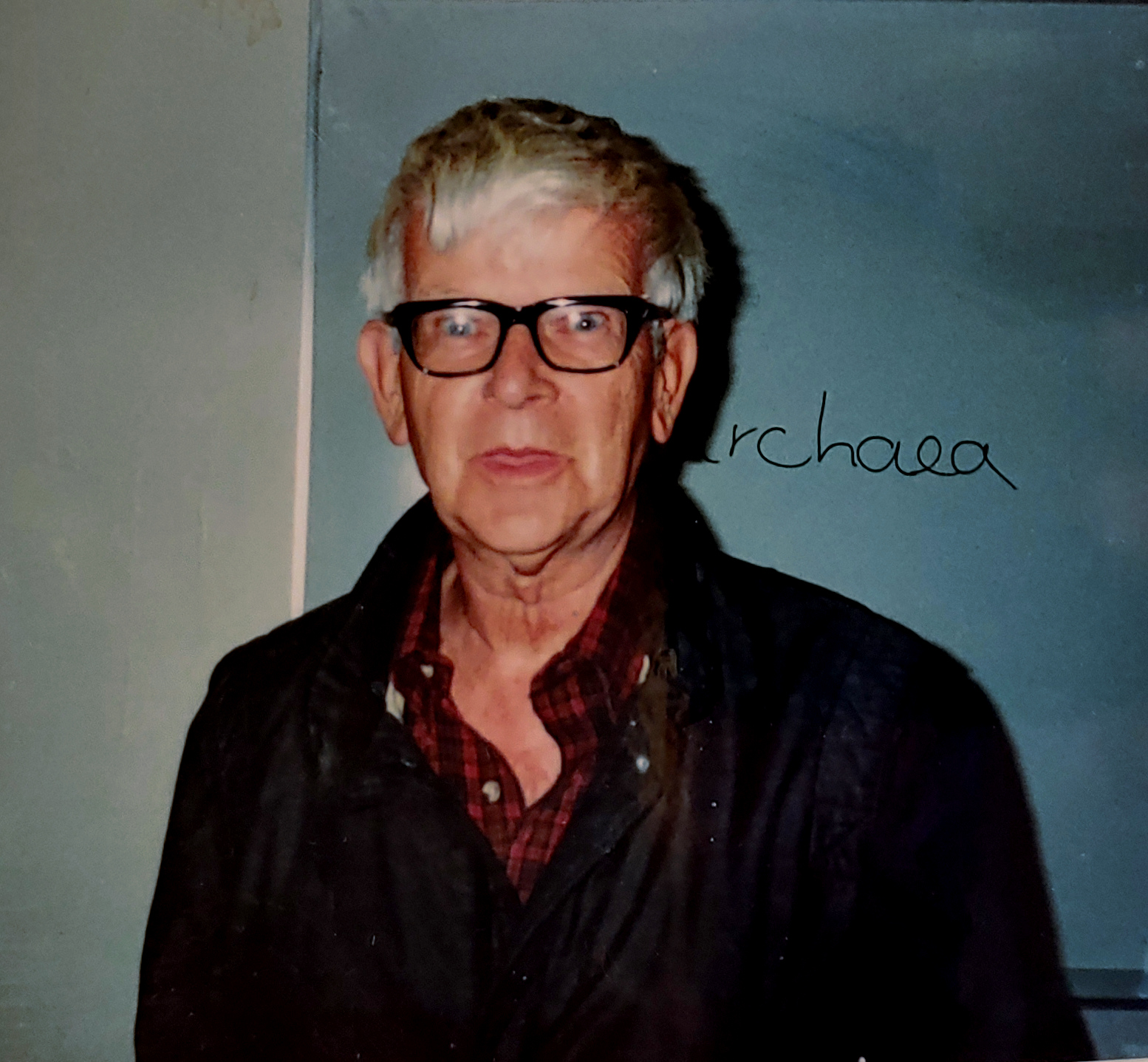
"Wes" Wehr, 1998

The original fossil site, located along Highway 20 in Republic Ferry County, was first discovered in 1977 by artist Wesley "Wes" Wehr and paleontologist Kirk Johnson, then a high school student from Seattle. The idea for the Stonerose Interpretive Center was the result of conversations in the mid-1980's between Wes Wehr and then Republic City council member Bert Chadick, who had noticed Wehr collecting fossils near the city hall. They considered the possible economic impact of a public interpretive center and fossil dig, allowing people to explore a "world class" fossil site, interact with researchers studying the finds, and show that important science could happen anywhere. Based on the discussions, Chadick and Wehr guided the city of Republic in purchasing a house for the center, funding and Curator position, and obtaining funds from the local economic district TRICO to fund an assistant curator position. The position of curator was taken on in 1987 by Madilane Perry, an anthropology graduate who had also recently taken a course in museology. While Perry had initially cautioned that the project was possibly impossible due to resources, she had been given support and training in paleobotany by Wehr on a trip to the Burke Museum in Seattle. The turn of the century house needed some renovation and repair, plus the addition of glass cases to house the fossil collection during the 1987. The center officially opened in August of that year as a proposed addition to the city parks department, with the name "Stonerose" being chosen as a reference to the rose family fossils found in the stones. While excavating for fill rock at the north end of the city, a larger more accessible site was uncovered by city residents. The Washington State Department of Community Development gave a grant allowing for the formation of the non-profit organization Friends of Stonerose fossils as a support group for the center in 1989. Another DCG grant was given in 1991 which facilitated a university accredited seminar for teachers on the use of fossils in class room teaching. The center was later moved to a house across from the city park which was jointly purchased by the city and the Ferry County Historical Society. The house was later expanded in 1996 with funds from a Washington State Legislature grant totaling $50,000. Through fund raising efforts such as "bingo bashes" the Friends of Stonerose fossils purchased over 10 city blocks of land surrounding and including the "Boot Hill" site, which itself had around 100 ft (30 m) of exposed strata. During the 1995 digging season the center recorded more than 9,000 visitors, an amount greater than the population of Ferry County that year, and as of 2014 the center averaged about 6,000 visitors per year and a since its formation had seen over 120,000 visitors.

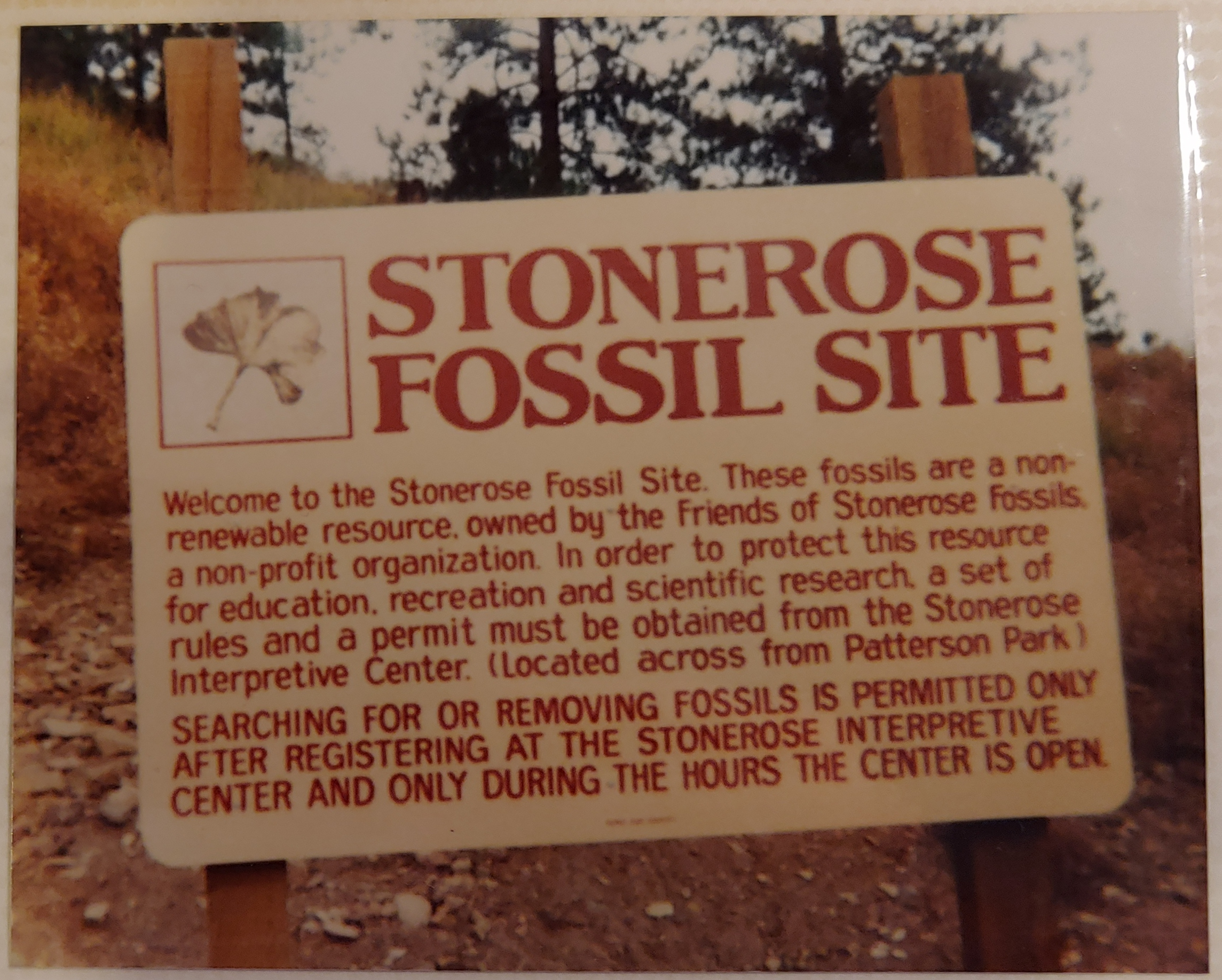
Sign on the fossil site c. 1992

In 2019 the center again prepared for the possibility of moving locations, with fundraising to purchase a 4,000 sq ft (370 m^{2}) building on Clark Avenue, the city main street. The fundraising through early 2020 raised over $20,000 in capital and allowed for the building acquisition, along with resumption of socially distanced operations by mid-summer 2020. The fossil site is a short walk away from the interpretive center and public digging is permitted with a permit. Visitors may retain a limited number of fossil pieces per person per day, while significant finds are retained by the center. Retained fossils have are accessioned into a customized database, Stonerose strata, and the finders name and details are kept both digitally and as a hardcopy with the specimen in perpetuity. The center asks that fossil finders be recognized in research publications on the fossils, and several new taxa have been named for finders. The interpretive center and fossil site are still owned and operated by the Friends of Stonerose Fossils.

== Geology ==
The Stonerose fossil beds of Eocene Epoch age and part of the Eocene Okanagan Highlands, and preserve organisms that lived in the area circa 51 million years ago when the area that is now the city of Republic was part of an ancient lake. The lake bottom layers are composed of volcanic ash which hardened into sedimentary rock, becoming fine-grained tuffaceous shales of the Klondike Mountain Formation. The fossils include various extinct insects, fish, leaves and twigs, as well as bird feathers. The Republic upland lacustrine fossil beds are significant as they represent the earliest known records of the Rosaceae (rose family) and Aceraceae (maple family). Since the rediscovery of the Republic fossil beds, more than 200 species have been found in fossilized form.

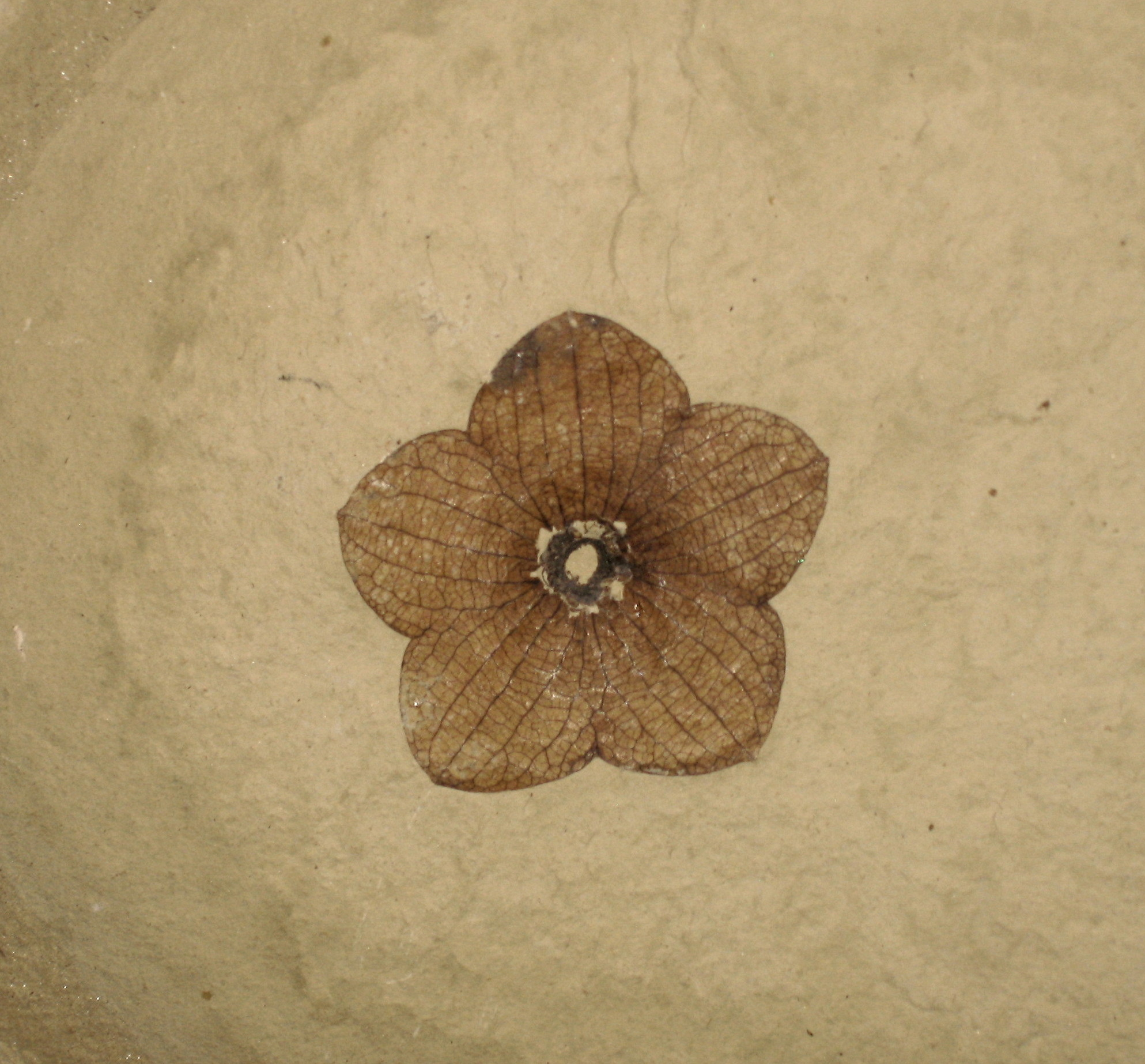
Florissantia quilchenensis, Stonerose Interpretive Center Collection, 2007

== Fossils ==
The Eocene fossil sites in Republic whose fossils feature in the Stonerose Interpretive center, are part of a series of Eocene lake beds with abundant fossil plants, insects, fish and other ancient life that extends well north into British Columbia in Canada, including the Princeton Chert, McAbee Fossil Beds, and Driftwood Canyon Provincial Park.

A fossil Florissantia quilchenensis, a flower from an extinct cocoa relative and a member of the family Malvaceae, is Stonerose's current logo. Found by Lisa Barksdale, former Stonerose curator, and Wehr, at the time a paleobotanist and Burke Museum curator, it was featured in the National Geographic Magazine, July 2002. The fossil collections at the interpretive center holds a number of published fossil specimens, such as several rare Dillhoffia cachensis fruits. The fossils and center have been included in Kirk Johnson and Ray Trolls travelling exhibit "Cruisin’ the Fossil Coastline.", which highlights the fossil history of the west coast from Alaska and Washington.
