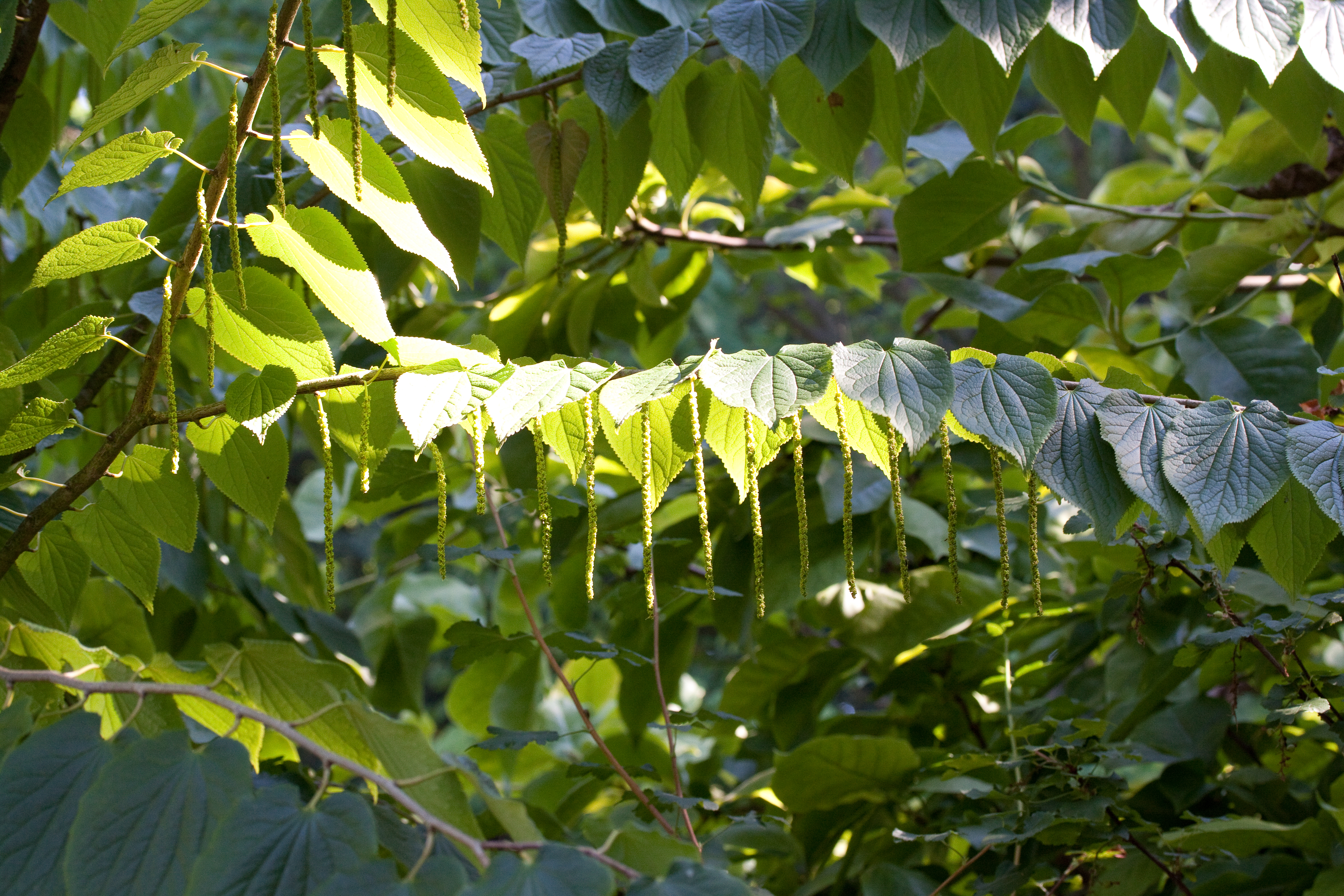
- Tetracentron sinense, leaves and flowers

Scientific classification
- Kingdom: Plantae
- Clade: Tracheophytes
- Clade: Angiosperms
- Clade: Eudicots
- Order: Trochodendrales
- Family: Trochodendraceae
- Genus: Tetracentron; Oliv.

Species
- †Tetracentron atlanticum; †Tetracentron hopkinsii; †Tetracentron piperoides; †Tetracentron remberi; Tetracentron sinense

= Tetracentron =

Genus of flowering plants in the family Trochodendraceae

Tetracentron is a genus of flowering plant with a sole living species being Tetracentron sinense and several extinct species. It was formerly considered the sole genus in the family Tetracentraceae, though it is now included in the family Trochodendraceae together with the genus Trochodendron.

== Range ==
The living Tetracentron sinense is native to southern China and the eastern Himalaya, where it grows at altitudes of 1,100–3,500 m (3,600–11,500 ft) in a temperate climate; it has no widely used common name in English, though is sometimes called "spur-leaf".

== Wood vessels ==
Tetracentron shares with Trochodendron the feature, very unusual in angiosperms, of lacking vessel elements in its wood. This has long been considered a very primitive character, resulting in the classification of these two genera in a basal position in the angiosperms; however, research in Molecular phylogenetics by the Angiosperm Phylogeny Group and others has shown that these two genera are not basal angiosperms, but basal eudicots. This suggests that the absence of vessel elements is a secondarily evolved character, not a primitive one.

== Fossil record ==
The fossil record, extending back to the Eocene, shows a much wider distribution than modern times. Fossils of this genus have been found in British Columbia, Canada,; Alaska, Washington state, United States; and Iceland. The Miocene Tetracentron atlanticum, described in 2008, is the first confirmed record of the genus in Europe. This species was described from pollen, fruits, and leaves found in Iceland.

Specimens from British Columbia and Washington state are found in a series of Eocene Lakes in the Okanagan Highlands region in association with several extinct Trochodendron species. The Paleogene species Tetracentron piperoides from Alaska is currently regarded as suspect due to the lack of associated fruits.

== Species ==
- †Tetracentron atlanticum (Miocene, Iceland)
- †Tetracentron hopkinsii (Ypresian, Allenby Formation, British Columbia; Klondike Mountain Formation, Washington state)
- †Tetracentron piperoides
- †Tetracentron remberi (Miocene, Clarkia, Idaho)
- Tetracentron sinense
