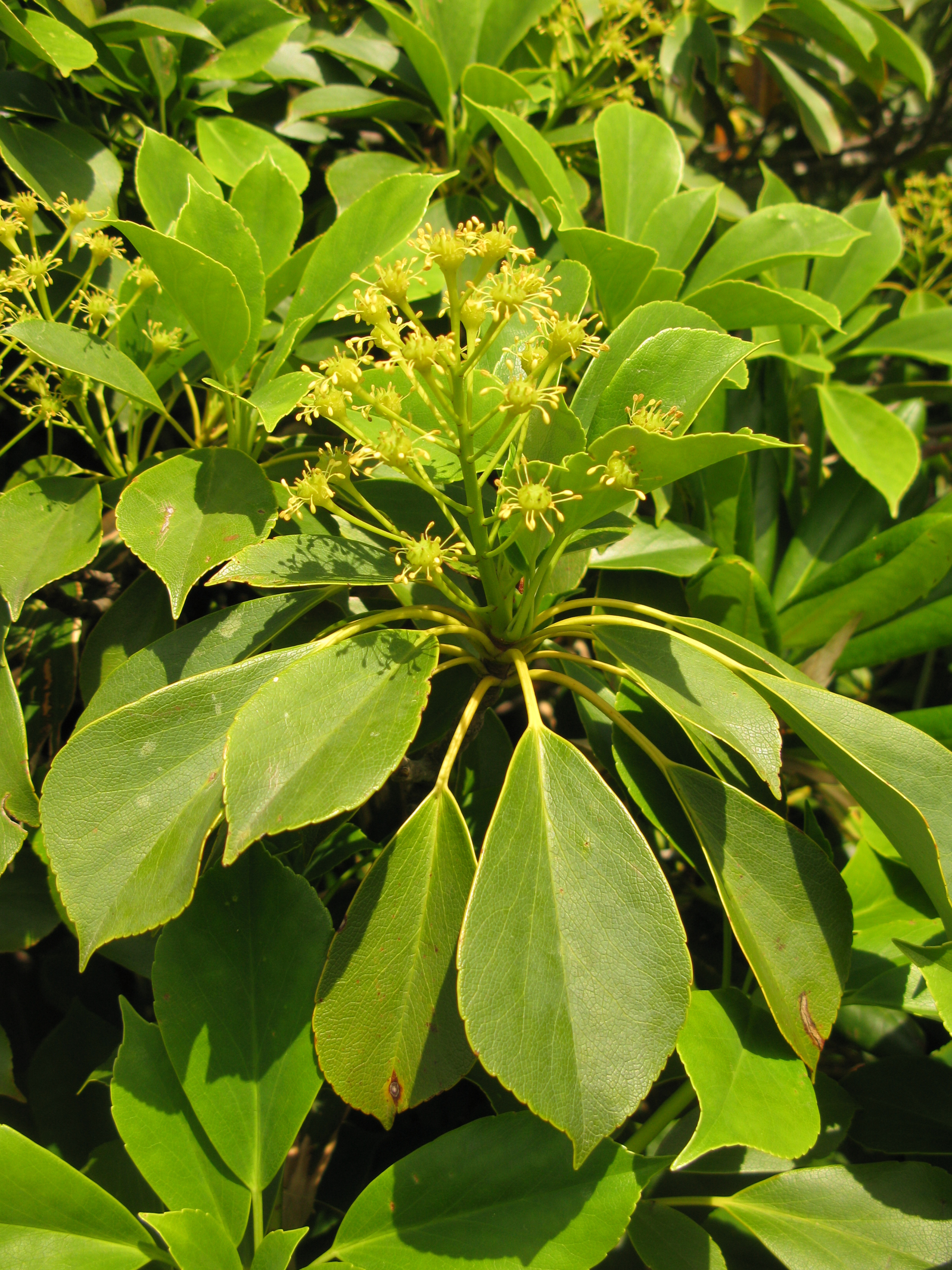

Scientific classification
- Kingdom: Plantae
- Clade: Tracheophytes
- Clade: Angiosperms
- Clade: Eudicots
- Order: Trochodendrales
- Family: Trochodendraceae
- Genus: Trochodendron; Siebold & Zucc., 1838

Species
- Trochodendron aralioides; †Trochodendron beckii; †Trochodendron drachukii; †Trochodendron evenense; †Trochodendron kamtschaticum; †Trochodendron nastae; †Trochodendron protoaralioides

= Trochodendron =

Trochodendron Temporal range: Ypresian to Recent 49.5–0 Ma

Genus of flowering plants in the family Trochodendraceae

Trochodendron is a genus of flowering plants with one living species, Trochodendron aralioides, and six extinct species known from the fossil record. It was often considered the sole genus in the family Trochodendraceae, though botanists now also include the distinct genus Tetracentron in the family.

== Species ==
- Trochodendron aralioides
- †Trochodendron beckii
- †Trochodendron drachukii (Infructescence; Ypresian, McAbee Fossil Beds, British Columbia)
- †Trochodendron evenense (Leaves; Miocene, Kamchatka)
- †Trochodendron infernense (Infructescence; Late Palaeocene, Fort Union Formation)
- †Trochodendron kamtschaticum (Infructescence; Miocene, Kamchatka)
- †Trochodendron nastae (Leaves; Ypresian, Klondike Mountain Formation, Washington state)
- †Trochodendron postnastae (Leaves; Langhian, Moose Mountain Flora, Oregon)
- †Trochodendron protoaralioides (Leaves; late Miocene, Japan)
- †Trochodendron rosayi (Infructescence; Langhian, Moose Mountain Flora, Oregon)

Trochodendron is native to Japan, southern Korea, Taiwan and the Ryukyu Islands, with fossils known from North America, Europe, and the Russian Far East.

Trochodendron aralioides is an evergreen tree or large shrub growing to 20 m tall. Trochodendron and Tetracentron lack vessel elements in their wood, a quite unusual feature in angiosperms. This has long been considered a very primitive character, resulting in the classification of these two genera in a basal position in the angiosperms; however, genetic research by the Angiosperm Phylogeny Group has shown it to be in a less basal position (early in the eudicots), suggesting the absence of vessel elements in these two genera is a secondarily evolved character, not a primitive one.

== Fossil record ==
Among the middle Miocene Sarmatian palynoflora from the Lavanttal Basin Austria researchers have recognized Trochodendron fossil pollen. The sediment containing the Trochodendron fossil pollen had accumulated in a lowland wetland environment with various vegetation units of mixed evergreen/deciduous broadleaved/conifer forests surrounding the wetland basin. Key relatives of the fossil taxa found with Trochodendron pollen are presently confined to humid warm temperate environments, suggesting a subtropical climate during the middle Miocene in Austria.
