= Infructescence =

Ensemble of fruits derived from the ovaries of an inflorescent plant

In botany, infructescence (fruiting head) is defined as the ensemble of fruits derived from the ovaries of an inflorescence. It usually retains the size and structure of the inflorescence.

In some cases, infructescences are similar in appearance to simple fruits. These are called multiple fruits. One example is the infructescence of Ananas, which is formed from the fusion of the berries with receptacle tissues and bracts.

The mature infructescence of a grain, such as wheat or maize, is known as an ear. The infructescence of Ficus is called a syconium.

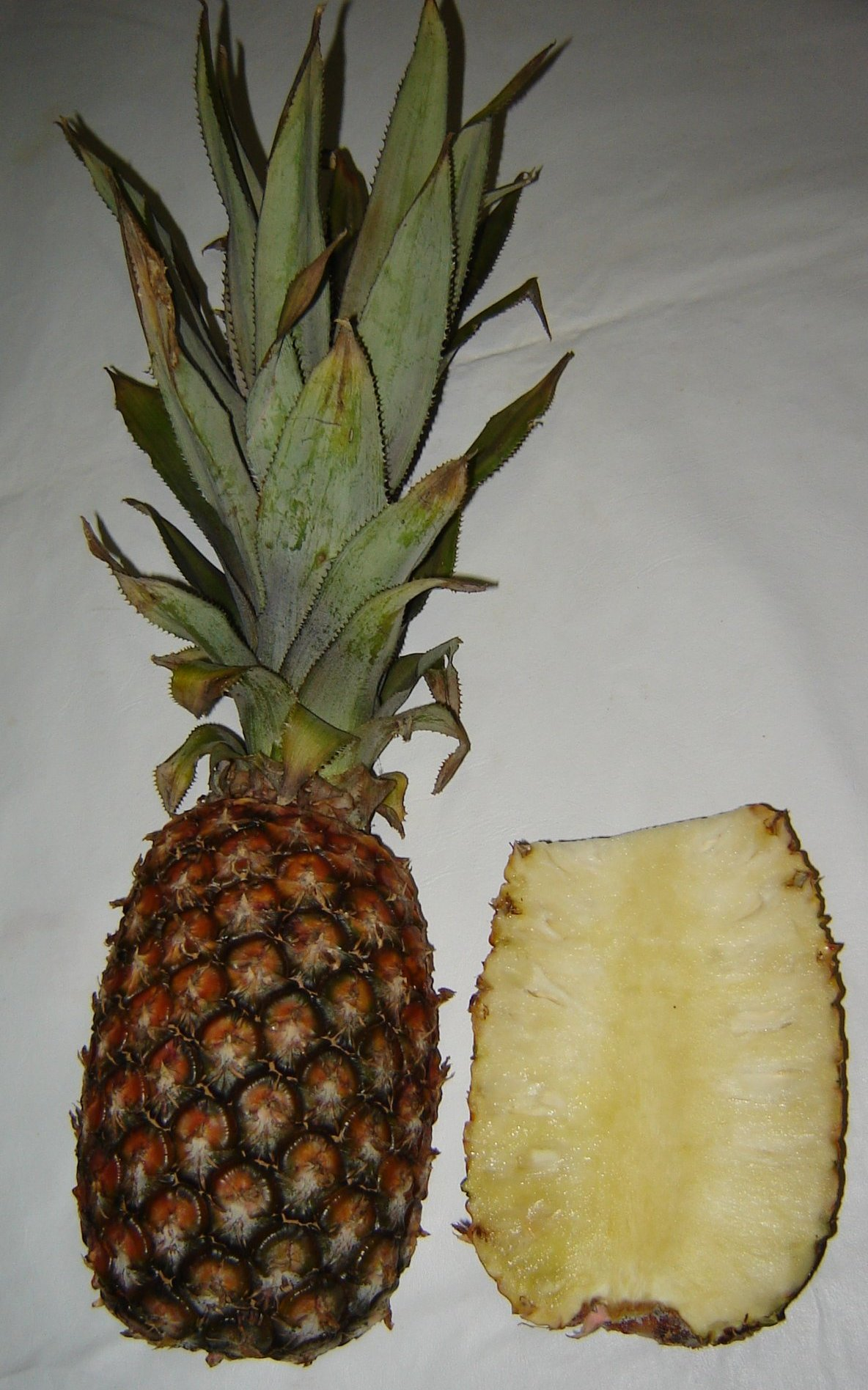
Ananas (pineapple) infructescence

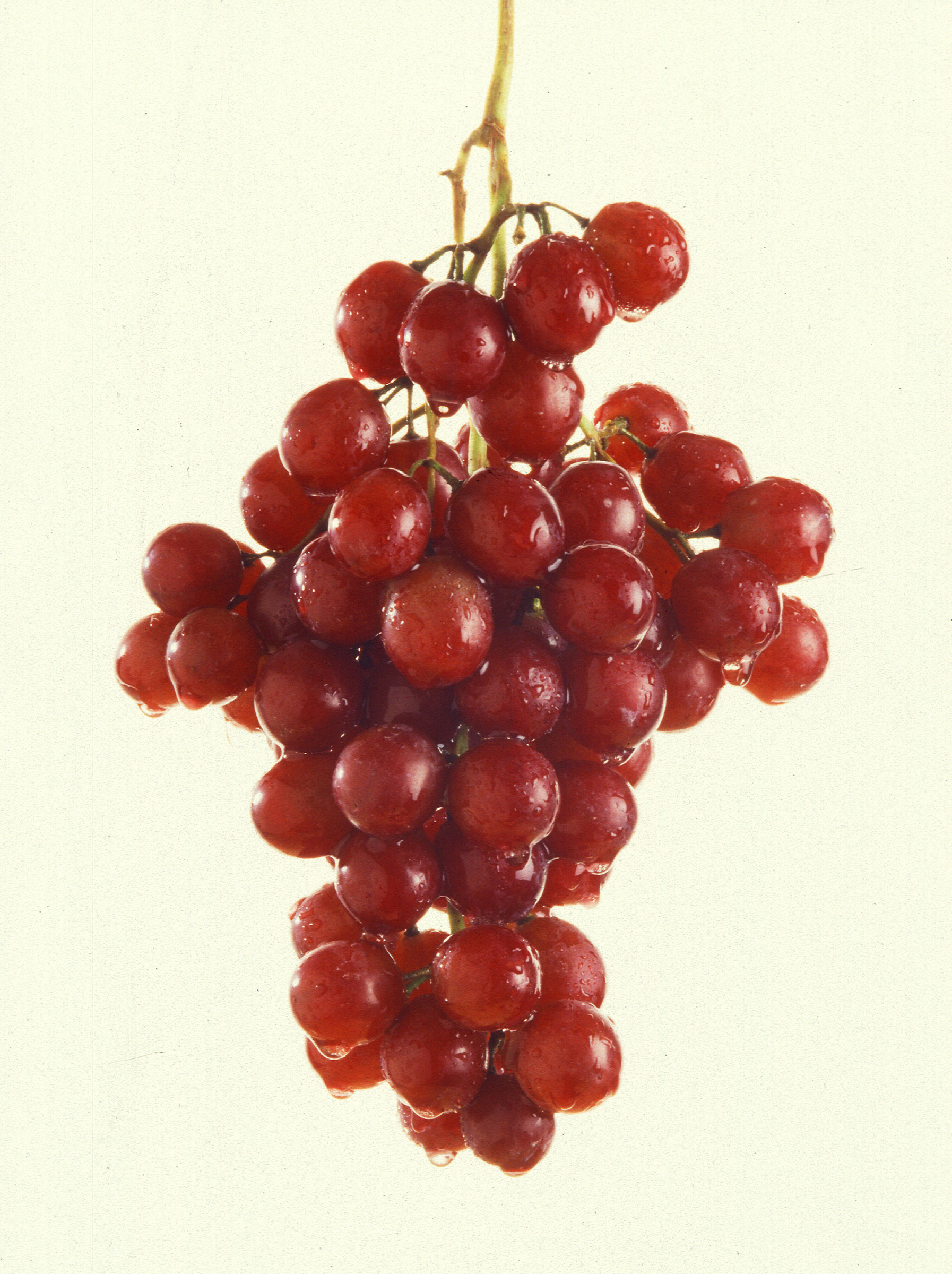
Vitis (grape) infructescence

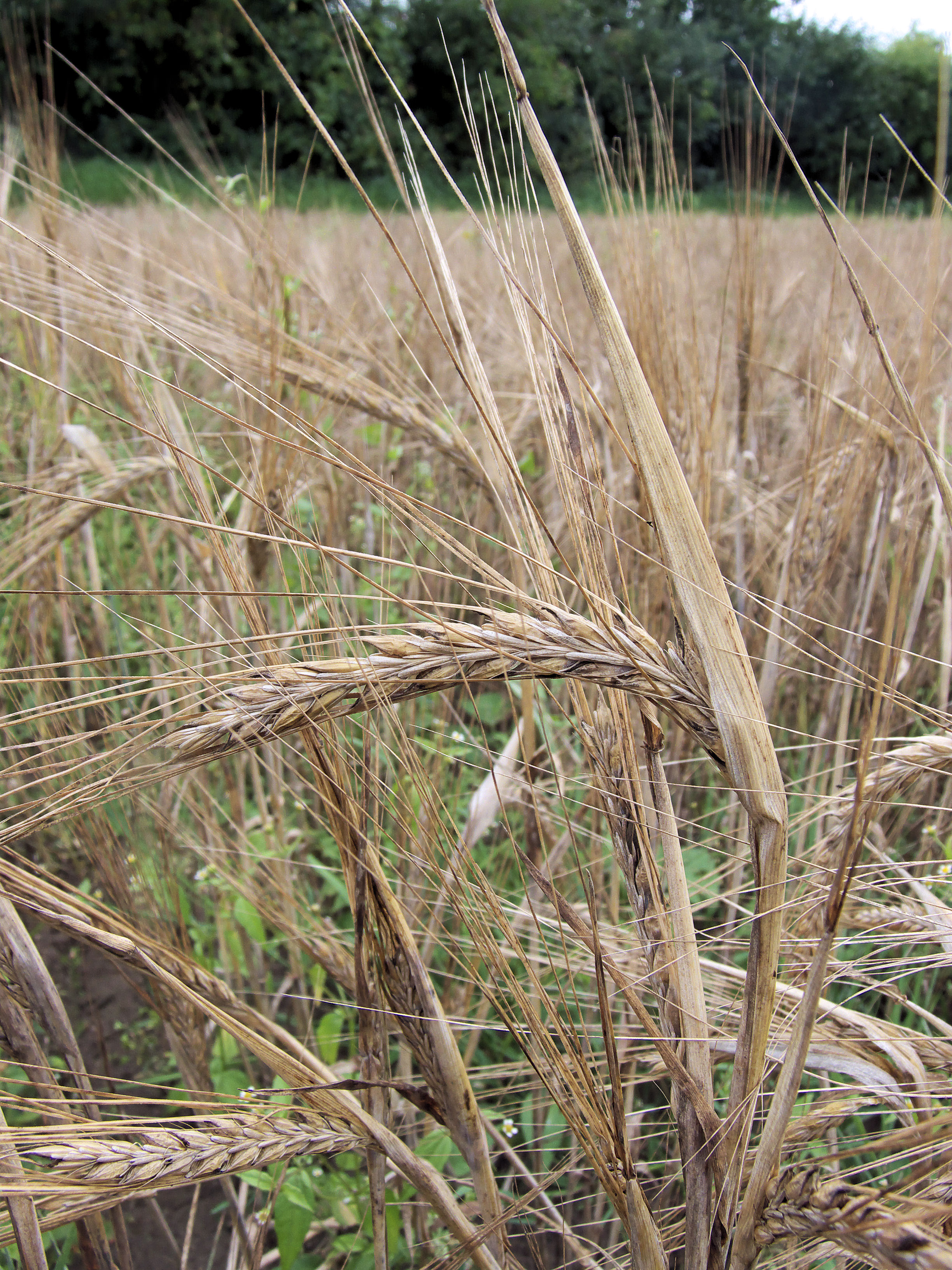
An ear of grain (barley)

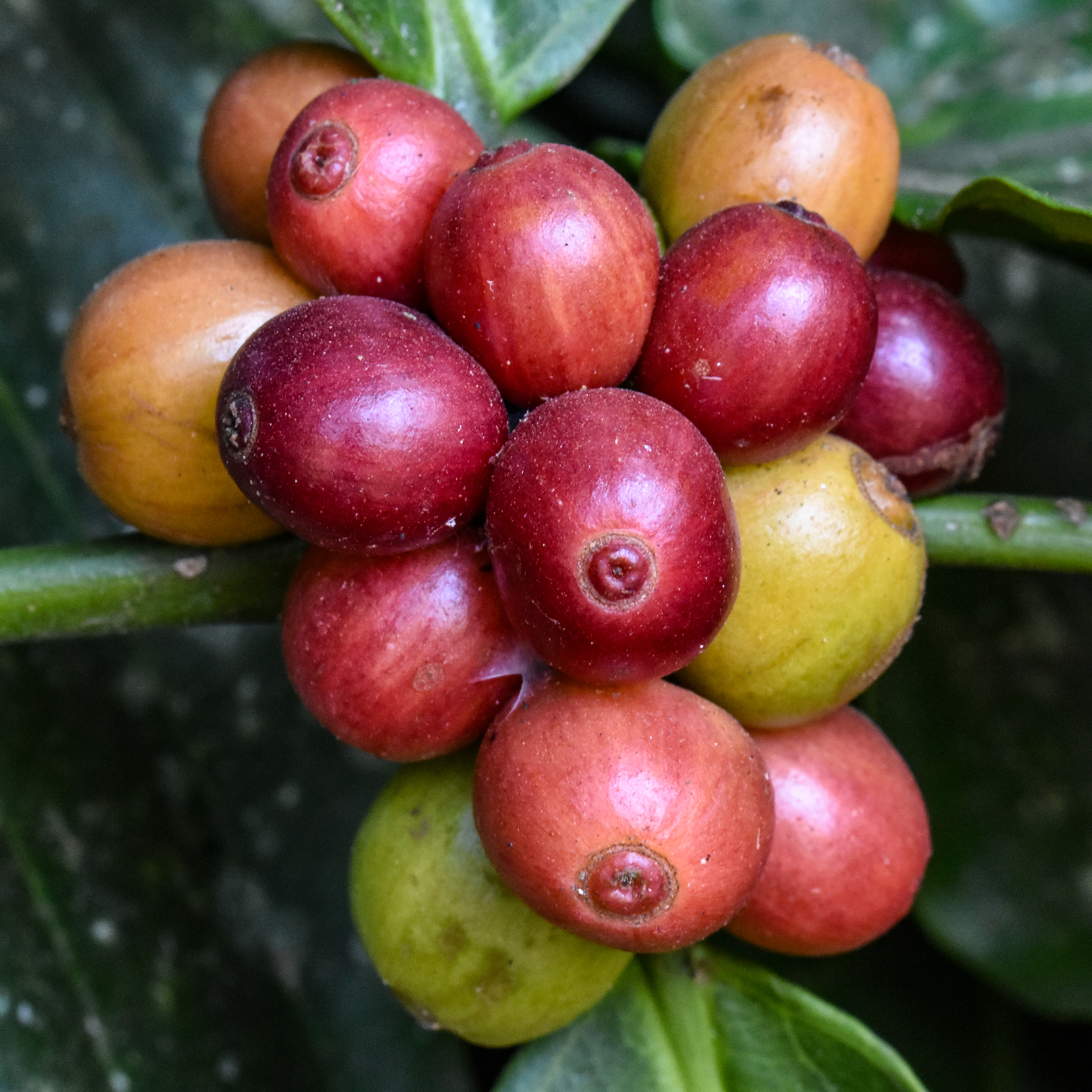
Coffea canephora (coffee robusta) berries
