= Paleobiota of the Klondike Mountain Formation =

The Paleobiota of the Klondike Mountain Formation comprises a diverse suite of Early Eocene plants and animals recovered in North Central Washington State from the Klondike Mountain Formation. The formation outcrops in locations across the north western area of Ferry County, with major sites in Republic, north west of Curlew Lake, and on the Toroda Creek area. The formation is the southern most of the Eocene Okanagan Highlands, sharing much of the paleoflora and paleofauna with site across Central and southern British Columbia.

== Plants ==
=== Bryophytes ===
Dillhoff et al. (2013) reference undescribed moss specimens known from the Klondike Mountain Formation known from vegetative gametophytes and they noted them to be similar to undescribed specimens from the Allenby Formation and Horsefly shales.

| Family | Genus | Species | Authors | Year | Notes | Images |
|---|---|---|---|---|---|---|
| Undescribed | Undescribed | Undescribed | | | Undescribed moss specimens | undescribed bryophyte |

=== Lycophytes ===
Rare specimens of Selaginella fossils were noted by Wehr (1998), with no species level description.

| Family | Genus | Species | Authors | Year | Notes | Images |
|---|---|---|---|---|---|---|
| Selaginellaceae | Selaginella | Undescribed | | | A spikemoss Not described to species | Selaginella species |

=== Pteridophytes ===
| Family | Genus | Species | Authors | Notes | Images |
|---|---|---|---|---|---|
| Cystopteridaceae | Cf. Cystopteris | Undescribed | | A possible bladder fern relative Not described to species | |
| Dennstaedtiaceae | Dennstaedtia | †Dennstaedtia christophelii | Pigg et al. | A Hayscented fern | Dennstaedtia christophelii |
| Equisetaceae | Equisetum | Undescribed | | A scouring rush Not described to species | Equisetum species Not described |
| Hymenophyllaceae | Hymenophyllum | †Hymenophyllum axsmithii | Pigg et al. | A filmy fern | |
| Lygodiaceae | Lygodium | Undescribed | | A climbing fern Not described to species | |
| Salviniaceae | Azolla | †Azolla primaeva | Arnold | A mosquito fern | Azolla primaeva |
| Salviniaceae | Salvinia | Undescribed | | A "watermoss" species. Not described to species Found only in Curlew half graben sites. | Salvinia species Not described |

=== Gymnosperms ===
Three major groups of gymnosperms are present in the Klondike Mountain Formation, with the most speciose being the pinophytes. The ginkgophytes are represented by two species of Ginkgo, while an undescribed Zamiaceae member is the sole cycadophyte.

==== Cycadophytes ====
| Family | Genus | Species | Authors | Notes | Images |
|---|---|---|---|---|---|
| Zamiaceae | Undescribed | Undescribed | | A zamiaceous cycad. Not described to genus/species | Undescribed zamiaceous leaf |

==== Gingkophytes ====
| Family | Genus | Species | Authors | Notes | Images |
|---|---|---|---|---|---|
| Ginkgoaceae | Ginkgo | Ginkgo biloba | Linnaeus | A ginkgo | Ginkgo biloba |
| Ginkgoaceae | Ginkgo | †Ginkgo dissecta | Mustoe | A ginkgo | Ginkgo dissecta |

==== Pinophytes ====
| Family | Genus | Species | Authors | Notes | Images |
|---|---|---|---|---|---|
| Cupressaceae | Calocedrus | Undescribed | | An incense cedar Not described to species | |
| Cupressaceae | Chamaecyparis | Undescribed | | A false cypress Not described to species Possibly in the Callitropsis nootkatensis lineage. | |
| Cupressaceae | Cryptomeria | Undescribed | | A sugi Not described to species | |
| Cupressaceae | Glyptostrobus | Undescribed | | A Chinese swamp cypress Not described to species | |
| Cupressaceae | Metasequoia | †Metasequoia occidentalis | (Newberry) Chaney | A dawn redwood | Metasequoia occidentalis |
| Cupressaceae | Sequoia | †Sequoia affinis | Lesquereux | A coast redwood Reported as "Sequoia langsdorfii" by Brown, 1935 | Sequoia affinis |
| Cupressaceae | Taiwania | Undescribed | | A Taiwania species not described to species | |
| Cupressaceae | Taxodium | †Taxodium dubium | (Sternberg) Heer | A bald cypress | |
| Cupressaceae | Thuja | Undescribed | | An arborvitae Not described to species | |
| Cupressaceae | Thujopsis? | Undescribed | | A possible Thujopsis; Not described to species. | |
| Pinaceae | Abies | †Abies milleri | Shorn & Wehr | Oldest true fir described | Abies milleri |
| Pinaceae | Picea | Undescribed | | A spruce Not described to species | |
| Pinaceae | Pinus | †Pinus latahensis | Berry | A 5-needle pine | Pinus latahensis |
| Pinaceae | Pinus | †"Pinus macrophylla" | Berry | A 3-needle pine, jr homonym to Pinus macrophylla Lindley 1839 | "Pinus macrophylla" |
| Pinaceae | Pinus | †Pinus monticolensis | Berry | A pine seed morphogenus | Pinus monticolensis |
| Pinaceae | Pinus | †Pinus tetrafolia | Berry | A purported 4-needle pine Noted by Berry as "highly improbable that this should represent a distinct botanic species" | "Pinus tetrafolia" |
| Pinaceae | Pseudolarix | †Pseudolarix wehrii | Gooch | A golden larch Originally described as Pseudolarix americana. | Pseudolarix wehrii |
| Pinaceae | Tsuga | Undescribed | | A hemlock Not described to species | |
| Sciadopityaceae | Sciadopitys | Undescribed | | An umbrella pine Not described to species | Sciadopitys species |
| Taxaceae | Amentotaxus | Undescribed | | A yew Not described to species | Amentotaxus sp. |
| Taxaceae | Cephalotaxus | Undescribed | | A yew Originally placed in the Miocene Cephalotaxus bonseri Not described to species | |
| Taxaceae | Taxus | Undescribed | | A yew Not described | |
| Taxaceae | Cf. Torreya | Undescribed | | A plum-yew relative Not described to genus/species | |

=== Flowering plants ===
Angiosperms, commonly called flowering plants belong to a single plant clade which diverged from other plants during the prior to the Cretaceous, and began to rapidly evolve and radiate by the Middle Cretaceous. Angiosperm diversification during the Cretaceous and Paleocene resulted in eight recognized clades that are segregated into two groups the Basal angiosperms and Core angiosperms. Present in the Klondike Mountain Formation are four of the eight groups, Nymphaeales representing Basal Angiosperms, plus Magnoliids, Monocots, and Eudicots all in the Core angiosperms.

==== Nymphaeales ====
The Basal Angiosperms are represented by a single Nymphaeales water-lily species Nuphar carlquistii, though a second member, Allenbya collinsonae, has been described from the Princeton Chert. Wehr (1995) illustrated two fossils that were tentatively identified as fruits of the banana genus Ensete and the extinct myrtle genus Paleomyrtinaea respectively, however further fossil finds resulted in the re-identification of the first as a N. carlquistii rhizome section, and the second is a seed mass from the same water-lily.

| Family | Genus | Species | Authors | Notes | Images |
|---|---|---|---|---|---|
| Nymphaeaceae | Nuphar | †Nuphar carlquistii | DeVore, Taylor, & Pigg | A waterlily, Rhizome sections were first identified as Ensete; Seed masses first identified as Paleomyrtinaea. | Nuphar carlquistii seeds |

==== Magnoliids ====
Under the APG IV system of flowering plant classification, the magnoliids are divided into four orders Canellales, Laurales, Magnoliales, and Piperales. Member species and undescribed taxa placed confidently in the Laurales and Magnoliales are present in the formation. The laurales are the most diverse magnoliid order of the formation with one described species Sassafras hesperia plus three tentatively identified genera which have not been described. Of the magnoliales, only an undescribed Magnolia, having possible affinity with Magnolia subg. Talauma, is found in the formation, while Liriodendroxylon princetonensis has described from permineralized wood in the Princeton Chert. The extinct angiosperm genus Dillhoffia has noted similarities to the piperalean family Aristolochiaceae, but was left incertae sedis as to family by Manchester and Pigg (2008) due to a lack of confident morphological characters for placement. Piperales are known from the Princeton chert, with Saururus tuckerae representing the oldest confident Saururaceae species in the fossil record.

| Family | Genus | Species | Authors | Notes | Images |
|---|---|---|---|---|---|
| Lauraceae | †Litseaphyllum | Undescribed | | A lauraceous form species. Not described to species | |
| Lauraceae | Ocotea | Undescribed | | A stinkwood species. Not described to species | |
| Lauraceae | Phoebe | Undescribed | | A Phoebe species. Not described to species | |
| Lauraceae | Sassafras | †Sassafras hesperia | Berry | A sassafras | Sassafras hesperia |
| Magnoliaceae | Magnolia | Undescribed | | A magnolia, possibly Magnolia subgenus Talauma; Not described to species | Magnolia |
| incertae sedis | †Dillhoffia | †Dillhoffia cachensis | Manchester & Pigg | A flower of uncertain floral affinity | Dillhoffia cachensis |

==== Monocots ====
The second largest clade of flowering plants, monocots are divided into eleven separate orders and of those, the Alismatales, Asparagales, Liliales, and Poales are found in the Klondike Mountain Formation, each represented by a single taxon. The Alismatales are represented by the Araceae species Orontium wolfei, which is considered similar to the modern golden clubs of eastern North America, while the extinct Paleoallium belongs to the Liliales. Asparagales and Poales are both present as undescribed species associated with the genera Smilax and Typha respectively. Extinct genera of monocots are also represented in the Princeton chert by the arecalean palm Uhlia, the alismatalean genus Heleophyton, the alismatalean Keratosperma, the asparagalean pollen morphogenus Pararisteapollis, the lilialean genus Soleredera, and the poalean genus Ethela,

| Family | Genus | Species | Authors | Notes | Images |
|---|---|---|---|---|---|
| Amaryllidaceae | †Paleoallium | †Paleoallium billgenseli | Pigg, Bryan, & DeVore | An onion relative | Paleoallium billgenseli |
| Araceae | Orontium | †Orontium wolfei | Bogner, Johnson, Kvaček & Upchurch | A golden club | Orontium wolfei |
| Smilacaceae | Smilax | Undescribed | | A greenbrier species. Not described to species. | |
| Typhaceae | Typha | Undescribed | | A cattail species. Not described to species. | |

==== Eudicots ====
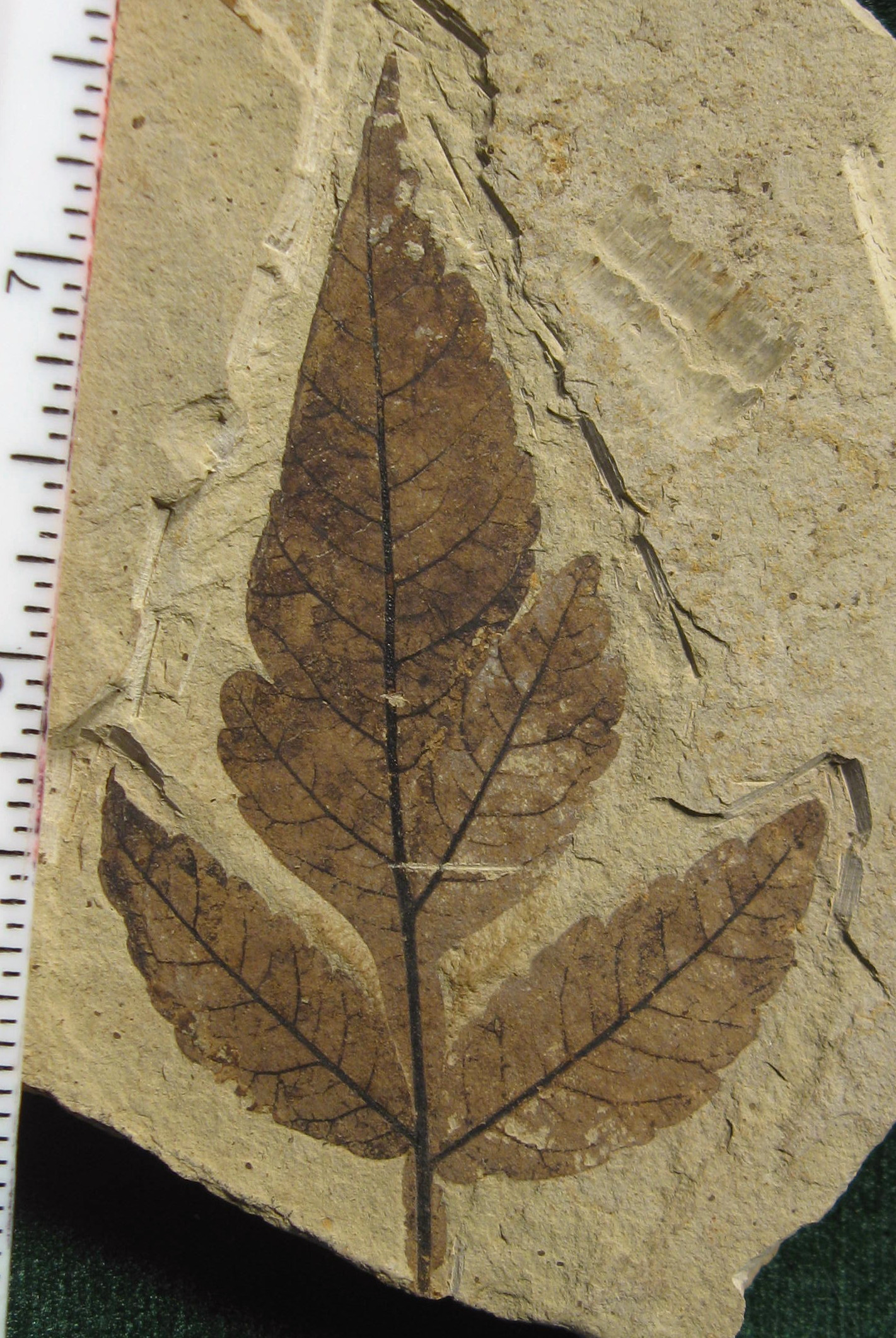
Rhus hybrid leaf with lobed terminal leaflet

Over a dozen different Rosaceae genera, both extant and extinct, have been identified in the formation providing some of the oldest reliable macrofossil records (excluding fossil pollen) for the family. Benedict et al. (2011) described first fossils for the prunoid genus Oemleria along with the oldest Prunus flowers. The Prunus flowers are complemented by leaf fossils representing five to six distinct morphotypes. Spiraea is known from an inflorescence with multiple flowers and leaves that are either from the genus or a closely related extinct type. The leaves frequently are preserved with a persistent stipule, a feature not found in modern Spiraea species. The firethorn genus Pyracantha and the South American genus Hesperomeles have been tentatively identified from leaves while Maloidea leaves belonging to either Malus or Pyrus have been found. Two distinct species of the Asian endemic genus Photinia are known, however only one of them Photinia pageae had been described as of 2007. The rosaceous genus Physocarpus had been reported by Hopkins and Wehr (1994) as also occurring in the formation, however subsequent examination of the fossils by Oh & Potter (2005) failed to find stellate trichomes which are a distinct feature of the genus. They noted the fossils might be stem Neillieae, the rose tribe containing both Physocarpus and Neillia, or possibly Rubus, Crataegus, or Ribes.

Fossils of both Sorbus and Rhus species leaves showing evidence of being interspecies hybrids have been noted from the formation and Flynn, DeVore and Pigg (2019) described four species of sumac which formed multiple hybrids. Between three and four Trochodendraceae species that have been described from the Klondike Mountain Formation. Broadly circumscribed four species in three genera have been identified at Republic, Paraconcavistylon wehrii, Pentacentron sternhartae, Tetracentron hopkinsii, and Trochodendron nastae. Additionally the species Trochodendron drachukii is known from related Kamloops group shales at the McAbee Fossil Beds near Cache Creek, British Columbia. Manchester et al. 2018 noted that Tr. drachukii is likely the fruits of Tr. nastae, while Pe. sternhartae are likely the fruits of Te. hopkinsii. If fossils of the fruits and foliage in attachment are found, that would bring the species count down to three whole plant taxa. Additionally, the extinct genus Nordenskioldia is also known from the formation. The placement of Nordenskioldia is debated, with some treatments placing it into Trochodendraceae, while a 2020 analysis placed it outside of the crown-group Trochodendaceae. Wesley Wehr in 1994 reported Bignoniaceae seeds along with a single Rubiaceae fruit and an isolated Fabaceae leaf. An update of the floral list by Wehr and Manchester published in 1996 added an additional fifteen taxa identified from reproductive structures such as flowers fruits or seeds.

Pigg, Manchester, and Wehr (2003) noted in during the description of Corylus johnsonii and Carpinus perryae that they were the oldest confirmed hazelnut and hornbeam fossils. That status was affirmed by Forest et al. (2005) who used both as fossil calibration points for phylogenetic analysis of Betulaceae. Within the family Bignoniaceae, the fossil seeds and fruits are noted by Ze-Long Nie et al (2006) as the oldest confirmed for the family.

| Family | Genus | Species | Authors | Notes | Images |
|---|---|---|---|---|---|
| Anacardiaceae | Rhus | †Rhus boothillensis | Flynn, DeVore, & Pigg | A sumac, Hybridized with other Klondike Mountain Formation Rhus | Rhus boothillensis |
| Anacardiaceae | Rhus | †Rhus garwellii | Flynn, DeVore, & Pigg | A sumac, Hybridized with other Klondike Mountain Formation Rhus | Rhus garwellii |
| Anacardiaceae | Rhus | †Rhus malloryi | (Wolfe and Wehr) Flynn, DeVore & Pigg | A sumac, Hybridized with other Klondike Mountain Formation Rhus | Rhus malloryi |
| Anacardiaceae | Rhus | †Rhus republicensis | Flynn, DeVore, & Pigg | A sumac, Hybridized with other Klondike Mountain Formation Rhus | |
| Aquifoliaceae | Ilex | Undescribed | | A holly Not described to species | |
| Araliaceae | Aralia | Undescribed | | A spikenard species Not described to species. | |
| Betulaceae | Alnus | †Alnus parvifolia | (Berry) Wolfe & Wehr | An Alder | Alnus parvifolia |
| Betulaceae | Betula | †Betula leopoldae | Wolfe & Wehr | A birch | Betula leopoldae |
| Betulaceae | Carpinus | †Carpinus perryae | Pigg, Manchester, & Wehr | A hornbeam | Carpinus parryae |
| Betulaceae | Corylus | †Corylus johnsonii | Pigg, Manchester, & Wehr | A hazel nut | Corylus johnsonii |
| Betulaceae | †Palaeocarpinus | †Palaeocarpinus barksdaleae | Pigg, Manchester, & Wehr | A birch relative | Palaeocarpinus barksdaleae |
| Betulaceae | †Palaeocarpinus | Undescribed | | A birch relative different from the other Okanagan Highlands species | undescribed Palaeocarpinus species |
| Bignoniaceae | Undescribed | Undescribed | | A catalpa family member Not described to species | Bignoniaceae sp. fruit |
| Burseraceae | †Barghoornia | †Barghoornia oblongifolia | Wolfe & Wehr | An extinct Bursera relative | Barghoornia oblongifolia |
| Celtidaceae | Pteroceltis | Undescribed | | A cannabaceous fruit Not described to species | Pteroceltis species fruit |
| Cercidiphyllaceae | Cercidiphyllum | †Cercidiphyllum obtritum | (Dawson) Wolfe & Wehr | A katsura with suggested affinity to †Joffrea, First described as "Populus" obtrita | Cercidiphyllum obtritum |
| Cornaceae | Cornus | Undescribed | | A dogwood species, Not described to species | |
| Elaeocarpaceae | Sloanea | Undescribed | | An elaeocarpaceous fruit Not described to species | Sloanea sp. |
| Ericaceae | Arbutus | Undescribed | | A madrone relative Not described to species | |
| Ericaceae | Rhododendron | Undescribed | | A rhododendron Not described to species | |
| Ericaceae | Cf. Leucothoe | Undescribed | | A doghobble relative Not described to species | |
| Eucommiaceae | Eucommia | †Eucommia montana | Brown | A "hard rubber tree" | Eucommia montana |
| Fagaceae | †Castaneophyllum | Undescribed | | A Castanea relative Not described to species | |
| Fagaceae | †Fagopsis | †Fagopsis undulata | (Knowlton) Wolfe & Wehr | A beech relative | Fagopsis undulata |
| Fagaceae | Fagus | †Fagus langevinii | Manchester & Dillhoff | A beech | Fagus langevinii |
| Fagaceae | Quercus | Undescribed | | An oak Not described to species | |
| Grossulariaceae | Ribes | "Species 1" | | A current Not described to species | |
| Grossulariaceae | Ribes | "Species2" | | A current Not described to species | |
| Hamamelidaceae | Corylopsis | †Corylopsis reedae | Radtke, Pigg, & Wehr | A winter-hazel | Corylopsis reedae |
| Hamamelidaceae | Fothergilla | †Fothergilla malloryi | Radtke, Pigg, & Wehr | A witch alder | Fothergilla malloryi |
| Hydrangeaceae | Hydrangea | Undescribed | | A Hydrangea. Not described to species | |
| Hydrangeaceae | Philadelphus | Undescribed | | A mock-orange Not described to species | |
| Icacinaceae | †Palaeophytocrene | Unidentified | | A Phytocrene relative Not described to species | |
| Iteaceae | Itea | Undescribed | | A virginia willow species Not described to species. | |
| Juglandaceae | Carya | Undescribed | | A walnut family relative. Not described to species. | |
| Juglandaceae | †Cruciptera | †Cruciptera simsonii | (Brown) Manchester | A walnut family relative. | |
| Juglandaceae | Juglans | Undescribed | | A walnut family relative. Not described to species. | |
| Juglandaceae | Pterocarya | Undescribed | | A wing nut Not described to species | |
| Lythraceae | Decodon | Undescribed | | A swamp loosestrife Not described to species | |
| Malvaceae | Craigia | Undescribed | | A Craigia species Not described to species | Craigia sp. |
| Malvaceae | †Florissantia | †Florissantia quilchenensis | (Mathewes & Brooke) Manchester | A chocolate relative | Florissantia quilchenensis |
| Malvaceae | Hibiscus | Undescribed | | A hibiscus Not described to species | |
| Malvaceae | †Plafkeria | Undescribed | | A linden relative Not described to species | |
| Malvaceae | Tilia | †Tilia johnsoni | Wolfe & Wehr | A Linden | Tilia johnsoni |
| Malvaceae | Cf. Tilia | Undescribed | | Linden relative fruits Not described to species | Cf. Tilia fruits |
| Melastomataceae? | "Schoepfia" | †"Schoepfia" republicensis | (LaMotte) Wolfe & Wehr | First described as a dogwood under "Cornus acuminata then a possible Schoepfia species, Placement in Schoepfiaceae rejected by Malécot and Lobreau‐Callen, (2005); S. republicensis fossil figured as Melastomataceae by Renner et al (2001) | "Schoepfia" republicensis |
| Menispermaceae | Calycocarpum | Undescribed | | A moonseed Not described to species | |
| Moraceae | Morus | Undescribed | | A mulberry, two types known. Not described to species | |
| Myricaceae | Comptonia | †Comptonia columbiana | Dawson | A Comptonia | Comptonia columbiana |
| Nyssaceae | †Tsukada | †Tsukada davidiifolia | Wolfe & Wehr | A dove-tree relative | Tsukada davidiifolia |
| Oxalidaceae? | †Averrhoites | Undescribed | | A leaf morphotype of uncertain affiliation. First described as visually similar to Averrhoa; Not described to species. | |
| Platanaceae | †Langeranthus | †Langeranthus dillhoffiorum | Huegele & Manchester | A plane tree fruit taxon affiliated with Langeria | |
| Platanaceae | †Langeria | †Langeria magnifica | Wolfe & Wehr | A plane tree Formerly identified as a witch hazel relative | Langeria magnifica |
| Platanaceae | †Macginicarpa | Undescribed | Manchester | A plane tree fruit taxon Not described to species | Macginicarpa species |
| Platanaceae | †Macginitiea | †Macginitiea gracilis | (Lesquereux) Wolfe & Wehr | A plane tree relative | Macginitiea gracilis |
| Platanaceae | †Platananthus | Undescribed | | A sycamore stamen head isolated stamen clusters placed as Macginistemon; Not described to species | Macginistemon stamen cluster |
| Polygalaceae | †Deviacer | Undescribed | | A milkwort relative Not described to species | Deviacer species |
| Ranunculaceae | Clematis | Undescribed | | A Clematis; Not described to species | Clematis species |
| Rosaceae | Amelanchier | Undescribed | | A service berry Not described to species | |
| Rosaceae | Cf. Crataegus | Undescribed | | A hawthorn relative Not described to species | |
| Rosaceae | Malus | Undescribed | | An apple Not described to species | |
| Rosaceae | Cf. Malus | Undescribed | | A maloid species possibly apple or pear Not described to species | |
| Rosaceae | Neviusia | Undescribed | | A snow-wreath Not described to species | |
| Rosaceae | Oemleria | †Oemleria janhartfordae | Benedict, DeVore, & Pigg | An Osoberry | |
| Rosaceae | Photinia | †Photinia pageae | Wolfe & Wehr | A Christmas-berry relative | Photinia pageae |
| Rosaceae | Aff. Physocarpus | Undescribed | | A possible nine-bark Not described to species Possibly stem Neillieae | |
| Rosaceae | Prunus | †Prunus cathybrownae | Benedict, DeVore, & Pigg | A cherry relative | Prunus cathybrownae |
| Rosaceae | Prunus | "Species 1" | | A prunoid leaf Not described to species | |
| Rosaceae | Prunus | "Species 2" | | A prunoid leaf Not described to species | |
| Rosaceae | Prunus | "Species 3" | | A prunoid leaf Not described to species | |
| Rosaceae | Pyracantha | Undescribed | | A firethorn sp. Tentative record, Not described to species. | |
| Rosaceae | Cf. Pyrus | Undescribed | | A maloid species possibly apple or pear Not described to species | |
| Rosaceae | Rubus | Undescribed | | A blackberry Not described to species | |
| Rosaceae | Aff. Sorbus | Undescribed | | A rowan relative Not described to species. | |
| Rosaceae | Spiraea | Undescribed | | A bridal wreath Not described to species. | |
| Rosaceae | Cf. Spiraea | Undescribed | | A bridal wreath relative Not described to species | |
| Sabiaceae | Meliosma | Undescribed | | A Meliosma species Not described to species | |
| Sabiaceae | Sabia | Undescribed | | A Sabia species Not described to species | |
| Salicaceae | Populus | Undescribed | | A cottonwood Not described to species First identified as †Populus lindgreni | |
| Salicaceae | †Pseudosalix | Undescribed | | A willow relative Not described to species | |
| Salicaceae | Salix | Undescribed | | A willow Not described to species | |
| Sapindaceae | Acer? | †"Acer" arcticum | Heer, 1876 | A possible maple | |
| Sapindaceae | Acer | †Acer hillsi | Wolfe & Tanai | A maple | |
| Sapindaceae | Acer | †Acer republicense | Wolfe & Tanai | A maple | |
| Sapindaceae | Acer | †Acer spitzi | Wolfe & Tanai | A maple | |
| Sapindaceae | Acer | †Acer stonebergae | Wolfe & Tanai | A maple | |
| Sapindaceae | Acer | †Acer toradense | Wolfe & Tanai | A maple | |
| Sapindaceae | Acer | †Acer washingtonense | Wolfe & Tanai | A maple | |
| Sapindaceae | Acer | †Acer wehri | Wolfe & Tanai | A maple | |
| Sapindaceae | Aesculus | Undescribed | | A horse chestnut Not described to species. | |
| Sapindaceae | Cf. Boniodendron | †"Koelreuteria" arnoldii | Becker | A sapindaceous species first described as a Koelreuteria species, considered Cf. Boniodendron by Wang et al. (2012). | "Koelreuteria" arnoldii |
| Sapindaceae | †Bohlenia | †Bohlenia americana | (Brown) Wolf & Wehr | An extinct sapindalean species | Bohlenia americana |
| Sapindaceae | Dipteronia | †Dipteronia brownii | McClain & Manchester | A Dipteronia | Dipteronia brownii |
| Sapindaceae | Koelreuteria | †Koelreuteria dilcheri | Wang et al. | A Koelreuteria species | Koelreuteria dilcheri |
| Schisandraceae | Kadsura | Undescribed | | A kadsura species. Not described to species | |
| Theaceae | †Ternstroemites | "Species A" | | A theaceous species similar to Gordonia; Not described to species | Ternstroemites 'Species A' |
| Theaceae | †Ternstroemites | "Species B" | | A theaceous species similar to Cleyera; Not described to species | Ternstroemites 'Species B' |
| Trochodendraceae? | †Nordenskioldia | Undescribed | | A trochodendroid of uncertain placement. Fruits of the leaf taxon Zizyphoides; Not described to species. | |
| Trochodendraceae | †Paraconcavistylon | †Paraconcavistylon wehrii | (Manchester et al.) | A Trochodendrale first described as "Concavistylon" wehrii moved to a new genus in 2020. | |
| Trochodendraceae | †Pentacentron | †Pentacentron sternhartae | Manchester et al. | A Trochodendrale | Pentacentron sternhartae |
| Trochodendraceae | Tetracentron | †Tetracentron hopkinsii | Pigg et al. | A Trochodendrale, possibly the leaves of Pentacentron sternhartae | Tetracentron hopkinsii |
| Trochodendraceae | Trochodendron | †Trochodendron nastae | Pigg, Wehr, & Ickert-Bond | A Trochodendron; Possibly the leaves of Trochodendron drachukii | Trochodendron nastae |
| Trochodendraceae | †Zizyphoides | Undescribed | | A trochodendroid of uncertain placement. Leaves of the fruit taxon Nordenskioldia; Not described to species. | Zizyphoides species |
| Ulmaceae | †Cedrelospermum | Undescribed | | An elm relative Not described to species | |
| Ulmaceae | Ulmus | †Ulmus chuchuanus | (Berry) LaMotte | An elm species Leaves with features of Ulmus subg. Ulmus fruits with features of Ulmus subg. Oreoptelea | Ulmus chuchuanus |
| Ulmaceae | Ulmus | †Ulmus okanaganensis | Denk & Dillhoff | An elm species, the fruits were first identified as Ulmus section Chaetoptelea. | Ulmus okanaganensis |
| Vitaceae | Vitis | Undescribed | | Grape seeds and leaves Not described to species | |
| Incertae sedis | †Calycites | †Calycites ardtunensis | Crane | A winged fruit of unidentified affinities | Calycites ardtunensis |
| Incertae sedis | †Pteroheterochrosperma | †Pteroheterochrosperma horseflyensis | Smith, Greenwalt & Manchester | A samara of uncertain affiliation. | Pteroheterochrosperma horseflyensis |
| Incertae sedis | †Pteronepelys | †Pteronepelys wehrii | Manchester | A samara of uncertain affinities. | Pteronepelys wehrii |
| Incertae sedis | †Republica | †Republica hickeyi | Wolfe & Wehr | An incertae sedis angiosperm possibly of Hamamelididae affiliations | Republica hickeyi |

== Animals ==
=== Arthropods ===
The insect fauna of the Klondike Mountain Formation includes representatives from over 13 orders, based on a 1992 estimate, including immature though adult specimens and both terrestrial and aquatic taxa. The most prevalent orders are Diptera and Hemiptera, each making up approximately 30% of the fossil insects known in 1992.

==== Blattodea ====
| Family | Genus | species | Authors | Notes | Images |
|---|---|---|---|---|---|
| Blaberidae | Diploptera | †Diploptera praecisus | Archibald et al., 2026 | A beetle cockroach described from isolated tegmina. Also found in the Coldwater Beds at Quilchena | Paratype tegmina |
| Blaberidae | Diploptera | †Diploptera simeoptera | Archibald et al., 2026 | A beetle cockroach described from isolated tegmina. | holotype and paratypes |
| Blaberidae | Diploptera | Unidentified | | Diplopterine cockroaches Not detailed enough to place to species | |
| Blattoidae | Undescribed | Undescribed | | A blattoidean cockroach Not described to genus/species | Undescribed Blattoidea |
| Isoptera | Undescribed | Undescribed | | Undescribed termites of uncertain affiliation | undescribed isopteran |

==== Coleoptera ====
A list of Coleopteran families identified by 1992 included Carabidae, Cerambycidae, Chrysomelidae, Curculionidae, Dytiscidae, Elateridae and Lucanidae, but the beetle fauna has not been described in depth yet, with only two weevil species having been fully described. A third beetle group belonging to the bean beetle tribe Pachymerini has been identified as palm beetles of the Caryobruchus–Speciomerus genus group.

| Family | Genus | Species | Authors | Notes | Images |
|---|---|---|---|---|---|
| Brentidae | †Eoceneithycerus | †Eoceneithycerus carpenteri | Legalov, 2013 | An Ithycerinae weevil | Eoceneithycerus carpenteri |
| Brentidae | †Ithyceroides | †Ithyceroides klondikensis | Legalov, 2015 | An Ithycerinae weevil | |
| Carabidae | Undescribed | Undescribed | | A ground beetle Not described to genus/species | Unidentified Carabidae |
| Cerambycidae | Undescribed | Undescribed | | A long-horn beetle Not described to genus/species | |
| Chrysomelidae | Caryobruchus–Speciomerus genus group | Undescribed | | palm beetles in the tribe Pachymerini. Not described to genus/species | |
| Dytiscidae | Undescribed | Undescribed | | A diving beetle Not described to genus/species | |
| Elateridae | Undescribed | Undescribed | | A click beetle Not described to genus/species | |
| Lucanidae | Undescribed | Undescribed | | A stag beetle Not described to genus/species | |
| Unidentified | Undescribed | Undescribed | | A possible staphylinoid beetle not described | |

==== Dermaptera ====
The order Dermaptera was first reported in 1992 and is known from a series of isolated partial specimens, mostly abdominal sections with the distinct anal forceps attached. Based on the forceps structuring the specimens were tentatively assigned to the modern family Forficulidae, as the oldest North American representatives of the family known at that time.

| Family | Genus | Species | Authors | Notes | Images |
|---|---|---|---|---|---|
| Forficulidae? | Unidentified | "Forficulid species 1" | | A possible forficulid earwig with long cerci Not described to genus/species | "Forficulid species 1" |
| Forficulidae? | Unidentified | "Forficulid species 2" | | A possible forficulid earwig with short cerci Not described to genus/species | "Forficulidae species 2" undescribed |

==== Diptera ====
| Family | Genus | Species | Authors | Notes | Images |
|---|---|---|---|---|---|
| Bibionidae | Undescribed | Undescribed | | A march fly Not described to genus/species | unidentified Bibionidae |
| Cecidomyiidae | Undescribed | Undescribed | | Trace fossils Cecidomyiid midge galling on various host leaves Not described to genus/species | Cecidomyiidae gall on Prunus |
| Empididae | Undescribed | Undescribed | | A dagger fly Not described to genus/species | |
| Mycetophilidae | Undescribed | Undescribed | | A fungus gnat Not described to genus/species | |
| Pipunculidae | †Metanephrocerus | †Metanephrocerus belgardeae | Archibald, Kehlmaier, & Mathewes, 2014 | A pipunculid big-headed fly | Metanephrocerus belgardeae |
| Syrphidae | Unidentified | Unidentified | | A hover fly Not described to genus/species | |
| Tipulidae | Undescribed | Undescribed | | A crane fly Not described to genus/species | Undescribed Tipulidae |

==== Ephemeroptera ====
Lewis (1992) listed one species of Heptageniidae and three specimens that he did not place to family. The next year Lewis and Wehr (1993) gave a slightly more detailed description of the specimens again identifying one to Heptageniidae, possibly in the genera Heptagenia or Stenonema. The specimens were later examined by Nina D. Sinitchenkova (1999) who described one as a squaregill mayfly and the oldest member of the genus Neoephemera, confirmed the Heptageniidae identification but that it was unidentifiable to genus. The last specimen she confirmed as an ephemeropteran, but unidentifiable below order level.

| Family | Genus | Species | Authors | Notes | Images |
|---|---|---|---|---|---|
| Heptageniidae | Indeterminate | Indeterminate | | A flat headed mayfly nymph. Tentatively suggested as Heptagenia or Stenonema by Lewis & Wehr (1993); Deemed indeterminate below family level by Sinitchenkova (1999) | Heptageniidae nymph |
| Neoephemeridae | Neoephemera | †Neoephemera antiqua | Sinitchenkova, 1999 | A squaregill mayfly | |

==== Hemiptera ====
| Family | Genus | Species | Authors | Notes | Images |
|---|---|---|---|---|---|
| Aphididae | Undescribed | Undescribed | | An aphid Not described to genus/species. | |
| Aphrophoridae | Aphrophora | Undescribed | | An aphrophorid spittlebug Not described to species. | Aphrophora species |
| Aphrophoridae | †Petrolystra | Undescribed | | An aphrophorid spittlebug Not described to species. | |
| Cercopidae | †Palecphora | Undescribed | | A cercopid froghopper Not described to species. | |
| Cercopidae | Undescribed | Undescribed | | A cercopid froghopper Not described to genus/species. | undescribed Cercopidae |
| Fulgoroidea | Undescribed | Undescribed | | A frog hopper Not described to genus/species. | |
| Pentatomidae | Undescribed | Undescribed | | A Shield or stink bug Not described to genus/species | undescribed Pentatomidae |

==== Hymenoptera ====
A review of the Okanagan highlands hymenoptera published in 2018 identified four "Symphyta" families in the formation Cimbicidae, Pamphiliidae, Siricidae, and Tenthredinidae. Of the "Apocrita" families thirteen are represented, the "Parasitica" families are Braconidae, Diapriidae Ichneumonidae, Proctotrupidae, and Roproniidae while the Vespoidea families are Formicidae, Pompilidae, Scoliidae and Vespidae. Within Apoidea the "Spheciformes" families include Angarosphecidae and Sphecidae while Halictidae is the sole "Apiformes" family known from body fossils. Prunus and Ulmus leaves have been found having damage that is consistent with the damage pattern left by Megachilidae species bees when they remove sections of tissue for nest lining. There are several additional Apoidea fossils that were left as incertae sedis in the group based on the similarity between them and Paleorhopalosoma menatensis, a Paleocene species described from the Menat Formation Auvergne, France. The placement of P. menatensis is uncertain, having been initially described as a member of Rhopalosomatidae, but is possibly an Angarosphecidae or closely related taxon, based on the wing and body morphology.

| Family | Genus | Species | Authors | Notes | Images |
|---|---|---|---|---|---|
| Angarosphecidae | †Eosphecium | Undescribed | | An angarosphecid spheciform wasp. Not described to species | |
| Angarosphecidae | Undescribed | Undescribed | | An angarosphecid spheciform wasp Likely not Eosphecium. Not described to species | |
| Braconidae | Undescribed | Undescribed | | braconid parasitic wasps Not described to genus/species. | Unidentified Braconidae |
| Cimbicidae | †Leptostigma | †Leptostigma alaemacula | Archibald & Rasnitsyn, 2023 | A cenocimbicine cimbicid sawfly. | |
| Cimbicidae | †Leptostigma | †Leptostigma brevilatum | Archibald & Rasnitsyn, 2023 | A cenocimbicine cimbicid sawfly Tentatively identified from Republic described from the McAbee fossil beds | Leptostigma brevilatum? |
| Cynipidae | Undescribed | Undescribed | | Trace fossils cynipid Cynipoid gallwasp galling on various host leaves Not described to genus/species | Cynipidae gall on Prunus |
| Diapriidae | Undescribed | Undescribed | | A diapriid diaprioid wasp Not described to species | |
| Formicidae | †Klondikia | †Klondikia whiteae | Dlussky & Rasnitsyn, 2003 | An ant of uncertain subfamily affiliation | |
| Formicidae | Myrmeciites | "Indesterminate" | Archibald, Cover, & Moreau, 2006 | A bulldog ant form genus | Myrmeciities sp. |
| Formicidae | Oecophylla | †Oecophylla kraussei | (Dlussky & Rasnitsyn, 1999) | An ant, described as Camponotites kraussei, Moved to Oecophylla kraussei in 2017 | |
| Formicidae | †Propalosoma | †Propalosoma gutierrezae | Dlussky & Rasnitsyn, 1999 | A bulldog ant, first described as a Rhopalosomatidae wasp, moved to myrmeciinae in 2018 | Propalosoma gutierrezae |
| Formicidae | Undescribed | Undescribed | | Ants of uncertain subfamily placement. | Unidentified formicidae |
| Halictidae (?) | Undescribed | Undescribed | | A possible sweat bee Not described to genus/species | |
| Ichneumonidae | Undescribed | Undescribed | | ichneumonid parasitic wasps unplaced to subfamily Not described to genus/species | Undescribed Ichneumonidae |
| Megachilidae | Undescribed | Undescribed | | Megachilid leaf-cutter bee herbivory trace fossils on leaves Not described to genus/species | |
| Pamphiliidae | †Ulteramus | †Ulteramus republicensis | Archibald & Rasnitsyn, 2015 | A parasitic wasp | |
| Pompilidae | Undescribed | Undescribed | | A pompilid spider wasp Not described to genus/species | |
| Proctotrupidae | Undescribed | Undescribed | | A proctotrupid parasitic wasp Not described to genus/species | |
| Roproniidae | Undescribed | Undescribed | | A roproniid (sensu lato) proctotrupoid wasp Not described to genus/species | |
| Siricidae | †Eourocerus | †Eourocerus anguliterreus | Archibald & Rasnitsyn, 2022 | A siricine horntail. | Eourocerus anguliterreus |
| Scoliidae | Undescribed | Undescribed | | An archaeoscoliine scoliid wasps Not described to genus/species | |
| Sphecidae | Undescribed | Undescribed | | A sphecid (sensu stricto) wasp Not described to genus/species | |
| Tenthredinidae | Undescribed | Undescribed | | A Tenthredinid sawfly Not described to genus/species | |
| Vespidae | Undescribed | Undescribed | | A vespid wasp Not described to genus/species | |

==== Lepidoptera ====
A solitary lepidopteran body fossil has been recovered, but no full descriptive work has been made on the specimen, aside from a single PhD dissertation. Early examination placed the moth in the family Geometridae, but later work has identified it as the oldest member of the tiger moth subfamily Arctiinae. Trace fossil evidence from leaf fossil herbivory indicates at least four other possible lepidopteran families were present in the formation.

| Family | Genus | Species | Authors | Notes | Images |
|---|---|---|---|---|---|
| Coleophoridae | Undescribed | Undescribed | | Trace fossils Coleophorid hole feeding and larval cases Not described to genus/species | |
| Erebidae | Undescribed | Undescribed | | An arctiine tiger moth Not described | Arctiinae undescribed |
| Heliozelidae | Undescribed | Undescribed | | Trace fossils heliozelid leaf mining similar to Antispila mines Not described to genus/species | |
| Incurvariidae | Aff. Incurvaria | Undescribed | | Trace fossils incurvariid leaf mining similar to Incurvaria; Not described to genus/species | |
| Nepticulidae | Stigmella | Undescribed | | Trace fossils nepticulid leaf mining referred to Stigmella; Not described to genus/species | |

==== Mecoptera ====
A number of mecopteran species belonging to the families Cimbrophlebiidae, Dinopanorpidae, Eorpidae, and Panorpidae are also known.

| Family | Genus | Species | Authors | Notes | Images |
|---|---|---|---|---|---|
| †Cimbrophlebiidae | †Cimbrophlebia | †Cimbrophlebia brooksi | Archibald, 2009 | A Cimbrophlebiid scorpionfly | Cimbrophlebia brooksi |
| †Cimbrophlebiidae | †Cimbrophlebia | †Cimbrophlebia westae | Archibald, 2009 | A Cimbrophlebiid scorpionfly | Cimbrophlebia westae |
| †Dinopanorpidae | †Dinokanaga | †Dinokanaga andersoni | Archibald, 2005 | A scorpion fly species | Dinokanaga andersoni |
| †Dinopanorpidae | †Dinokanaga | †Dinokanaga dowsonae | Archibald, 2005 | A scorpion fly species | Dinokanaga dowsonae |
| †Dinopanorpidae | †Dinokanaga | †Dinokanaga sternbergi | Archibald, 2005 | A scorpion fly species | |
| †Eorpidae | †Eorpa | †Eorpa elverumi | Archibald, Mathewes, & Greenwood, 2013 | A mecopteran scorpionfly | Eorpa elverumi |
| †Eorpidae | †Eorpa | ?†Eorpa ypsipeda | Archibald, Mathewes, & Greenwood, 2013 | A mecopteran scorpionfly, tentatively identified | Possible E. ypsipeda |
| Panorpidae | Undescribed | Undescribed | | Undescribed common scorpionflies Not described to genus/species | |

==== Neuroptera ====
The neuropteran insects (lacewings and their allies) identified as of 2014 include species from the families Berothidae, Chrysopidae, Hemerobiidae, Ithonidae (including Polystoechotidae), Nymphidae, Osmylidae, and Psychopsidae.

| Family | Genus | Species | Authors | Year | Notes | Images |
|---|---|---|---|---|---|---|
| Chrysopidae | †Adamsochrysa | †Adamsochrysa wilsoni | Makarkin & Archibald, 2013 | 2013 | A nothochrysine green lacewing | Adamsochrysa wilsoni |
| Hemerobiidae | †Archibaldia | †Archibaldia wehri | (Makarkin, Archibald, & Oswald, 2003) | 2003 | A hemerobiid lacewing originally placed in †Cretomerobius; Moved to †Proneuronema (2016); Moved to †Archibaldia (2023) | |
| Ithonidae | †Allorapisma | †Allorapisma chuorum | Makarkin & Archibald, 2009 | 2009 | A moth lacewing | Allorapisma chuorum |
| Ithonidae | †Palaeopsychops | †Palaeopsychops barthae | Archibald & Makarkin, 2025 | 2025 | A polystechotid group moth lacewing | Palaeopsychops barthae |
| Ithonidae | †Palaeopsychops | †Palaeopsychops goodwini | Archibald & Makarkin, 2025 | 2025 | A polystechotid group moth lacewing | Palaeopsychops goodwini |
| Ithonidae | †Palaeopsychops | †Palaeopsychops marringerae | Archibald & Makarkin, 2006 | 2006 | A polystechotid group moth lacewing | Palaeopsychops marringerae |
| Ithonidae | †Palaeopsychops | †Palaeopsychops timmi | Archibald & Makarkin, 2006 | 2006 | A polystechotid group moth lacewing | Palaeopsychops timmi |
| Ithonidae | †Polystoechotites | †Polystoechotites barksdalae | Archibald & Makarkin, 2006 | 2006 | A polystechotid group moth lacewing | Polystoechotites barksdalae |
| Ithonidae | †Polystoechotites | †Polystoechotites falcatus | Archibald & Makarkin, 2006 | 2006 | A polystechotid group moth lacewing | Polystoechotites falcatus |
| Ithonidae | †Polystoechotites | †Polystoechotites lewisi | Archibald & Makarkin, 2006 | 2006 | A polystechotid group moth lacewing | Polystoechotites lewisi |
| Nymphidae | ?Nymphes | †Nymphes? georgei | Archibald, Makarkin, & Ansorge, 2009 | 2009 | A nymphid lacewing, possibly a species of †Epinesydrion | Nymphes georgei |
| Osmylidae | †Osmylidia | †Osmylidia glastrai | Makarkin, Archibald, & Mathewes, 2021 | 2021 | A protosmyline osmylid lacewing | |
| Psychopsidae? | †Ainigmapsychops | †Ainigmapsychops inexspectatus | Makarkin & Archibald, 2014 | 2014 | A possible psychopsid lacewing | Ainigmapsychops inexspectatus |

==== Odonata ====
| Family | Genus | Species | Authors | Year | Notes | Images |
|---|---|---|---|---|---|---|
| Aeshnidae | †Antiquiala | †Antiquiala snyderae | Archibald & Cannings, 2019 | 2019 | A darner dragonfly | Antiquiala snyderae |
| Aeshnidae | †Idemlinea | †Idemlinea versatilis | Archibald & Cannings, 2019 | 2019 | A darner dragonfly | Idemlinea versatilis |
| Aeshnidae | †Ypshna | †Ypshna brownleei | Archibald & Cannings, 2019 | 2019 | A darner dragonfly | Ypshna brownleei |
| †Dysagrionidae | †Dysagrion | †Dysagrion pruettae | Archibald & Cannings, 2021 | 2021 | A Dysagrionine cephalozygopteran odonate | Dysagrion pruettae |
| †Dysagrionidae | †Dysagrionites | †Dysagrionites delinei | Archibald & Cannings, 2021 | 2021 | A dysagrionine cephalozygopteran odonate | Dysagrionites delinei |
| †Dysagrionidae | †Okanagrion | †Okanagrion dorrellae | Archibald & Cannings, 2021 | 2021 | A Dysagrionine cephalozygopteran odonate | Okanagrion dorrellae |
| †Dysagrionidae | †Okanagrion | †Okanagrion hobani | Archibald & Cannings, 2021 | 2021 | A Dysagrionine cephalozygopteran odonate | Okanagrion hobani |
| †Dysagrionidae | †Okanagrion | †Okanagrion liquetoalatum | Archibald & Cannings, 2021 | 2021 | A Dysagrionine cephalozygopteran odonate | Okanagrion liquetoalatum |
| †Dysagrionidae | †Okanagrion | †Okanagrion threadgillae | Archibald & Cannings, 2021 | 2021 | A Dysagrionine cephalozygopteran odonate | Okanagrion threadgillae |
| †Dysagrionidae | †Okanagrion | †Okanagrion worleyae | Archibald & Cannings, 2021 | 2021 | A Dysagrionine cephalozygopteran odonate | Okanagrion worleyae |
| †Dysagrionidae | †Okanopteryx | †Okanopteryx jeppesenorum | Archibald & Cannings, 2021 | 2021 | A Dysagrionine cephalozygopteran odonate | Okanopteryx jeppesenorum |
| †Dysagrionidae | †Stenodiafanus | †Stenodiafanus westersidei | Archibald & Cannings, 2021 | 2021 | A Dysagrionine cephalozygopteran odonate | Stenodiafanus westersidei |
| Euphaeidae | †Republica | †Republica weatbrooki | Archibald & Cannings, 2021 | 2021 | A gossamerwing damselfly. Not to be confused with the plant Republica, also from the formation | Republica weatbrooki |
| †Whetwhetaksidae | †Whetwhetaksa | †Whetwhetaksa millerae | Archibald & Cannings | 2021 | A cephalozygopteran odonate | Whetwhetaksa millerae |

==== Orthoptera ====
| Family | Genus | Species | Authors | Year | Notes | Images |
|---|---|---|---|---|---|---|
| Palaeorehniidae | †Republicopteron | †Republicopteron douseae | Archibald, Gu, & Mathewes | 2022 | A grasshopper/hump-back grig relative | Republicopteron douseae |

==== Phasmatodea ====
Fossil wings first described in 2015 were identified as being from Susumanioidea stick-insects, a group that had previously been known from the Jurassic to the Paleocene only. Archibald and Bradler (2015) did not place Eoprephasma into Susumaniidae family, maintaining that known characters of the describe specimens did not match taxa in the family, they instead kept the genus as Susumanioidea incertae sedis. Phylogenetic analysis of Susumanioidea published by Yang et al. (2021) resulted in placement of Eoprephasma as the sister group to Renphasma deep within the Susumaniidae subfamily Susumaniinae. The phylogeny produced by Yang et al. indicated a sister group state with the Cretaceous genus Renphasma of China, and placed both as the most derived of the Susumaniinae taxa.

| Family | Genus | Species | Authors | Year | Notes | Images |
|---|---|---|---|---|---|---|
| †Susumaniidae | †Eoprephasma | †Eoprephasma hichensi | Archibald & Bradler, 2015 | 2015 | A Susumaniinae stick insect species | |

==== Raphidioptera ====
| Family | Genus | Species | Authors | Year | Notes | Images |
|---|---|---|---|---|---|---|
| Raphidiidae | †Megaraphidia | †Megaraphidia klondika | Archibald & Makarkin, 2021 | 2021 | A raphidiid snakefly | |

==== Trichoptera ====
Trichopterans are known mainly from laraval cases and occasional isolated wings.

| Family | Genus | species | Authors | Year | Notes | Images |
|---|---|---|---|---|---|---|
| Phryganeidae | Unidentified | Unidentified | | | giant caddisflies Not described to genus/species | |
| Limnephilidae | Unidentified | unidentified | | | northern caddisflies Not described to genus/species | |

=== Vertebrates ===
Five species of fish have been identified from the formation, four of which are known from skeletal elements, while the fifth is only known from isolated scales. Of the five species, two are unique to the formation, Hiodon woodruffi and Libotonius pearsoni were both described by paleoichthyologist Mark V. H. Wilson in 1978 and 1979 respectively. The other three species, "Amia" hesperia, Amyzon aggregatum, and Eosalmo driftwoodensis, were first described from Okanagan Highlands formations in British Columbia and subsequently also identified from Ferry County fossils. The first notation of fish fossils in the Republic area was by Joseph Umpleby in his 1910 visit to the area, who collected fish near the Tom Thumb Mine, and sent them to the National Museum of Natural History. After examining the fossils, Charles R. Eastman listed the specimens as belonging to the extinct species Amyzon brevipinne in his Fossil fishes in the collection of the United States National Museum. Research tapered off until a series of fish were collected in the Toroda Creek Graben northwest of Republic by Robert Carl Pearson during his early 1960's field mapping for the Geologic map of the Bodie Mountain quadrangle, Ferry and Okanogan Counties, Washington. The fossils were tentatively identified by paleoichthyologist David Dunkle in 1962 and 1965 as members of the genera Amyzon, Tricophanes, Erismatopterus and an undefined salmonid. Pearson sent almost all of the specimens collected to the Smithsonian, but the fossils were never accessioned into the collections and are now considered lost. He did retain one fossil from the initial collection which was later donated to the USGS collections. The largest single work on the fish of the Okanagan Highlands was published by Mark Wilson in 1977 and covered fossils collected from the known British Columbian Okanagan Highlands fossil sites of the time. While not covering the Washington State fossils, Wilson named two of the species that are currently recognized from the Klondike Mountain Formation Amyzon aggregatum and Eosalmo driftwoodensis. Additionally scales attributed to the genus Amia were discussed and the genus Libotonius was named from fossils in the Allenby Formation. In the late 1960s a collection of fish from near the Tom Thumb Mine in Republic was compiled by resident R. Woodward. During the summers of 1976 and 1977 the University of Alberta conducted field collecting in both the Republic and Toroda Creek areas, along with the donation of the Woodward collection, yielded a number of fossil catostomids, along with a single percopsid, a salmonid, a hiodontid, and an Amia scale. The hiodontids were subsequently described as the species Eohiodon woodruffi in 1978 based on differences between the Tom thumb Tuff fossils and those found in British Columbian sites. A year later the percopsid fossils were also described as Libotonius pearsoni, extending the range of the genus south from the Allenby Formation.

Bird fossils are limited to mostly isolated feathers that are preserved in the finer grained strata of the lake bed, though one partial bird skeleton has also been recovered.

| Family | Genus | Species | Authors | Year | Notes | Images |
|---|---|---|---|---|---|---|
| Amiidae | Amia | †"Amia" hesperia | Wilson, 1977 | 1977 | A bowfin, known from isolated scales | "Amia" hesperia scale |
| Catostomidae | †Amyzon | †Amyzon aggregatum | Wilson, 1977 | 1977 | A sucker | Amyzon aggregatum |
| Catostomidae | †Amyzon | Unidentified | (Wilson, 1977) | 1977 | A sucker, originally identified as Amyzon aggregatum | |
| Salmonidae | †Eosalmo | †Eosalmo driftwoodensis | Wilson, 1977 | 1999 | A Salmon | Eosalmo driftwoodensis |
| Hiodontidae | Hiodon | †Hiodon woodruffi | Wilson, 1978 | 1978 | A mooneye, first described as "Eohiodon" woodruffi. | Hiodon woodruffi |
| †Libotoniidae | †Libotonius | †Libotonius pearsoni | Wilson, 1979 | 1979 | A sand roller relative. | Libotonius pearsoni |
| incertae sedis (Aves) | Unidentified | "Unnamed" | | 2019 | indeterminate feathers and a skeleton | Unidentified feather |
