= Neoephemera maxima =

Scientific classification
- Domain: Eukaryota
- Kingdom: Animalia
- Phylum: Arthropoda
- Class: Insecta
- Order: Ephemeroptera
- Family: Neoephemeridae
- Genus: Neoephemera
- Species: N. maxima

Binomial name
- Neoephemera maxima (Joly, 1871)

Species of mayfly

Neoephemera maxima is a species of mayfly belonging to the family Neoephemeridae.

It is native to Europe.

Synonym:

- Leucorhoenanthus maximus
