= Neoephemera antiqua =

Neoephemera antiqua Temporal range: Ypresian

Scientific classification
- Kingdom: Animalia
- Phylum: Arthropoda
- Class: Insecta
- Order: Ephemeroptera
- Family: Neoephemeridae
- Genus: Neoephemera
- Species: †N. antiqua

Binomial name
- †Neoephemera antiqua Sinitchenkova, 1999

Extinct species of insect

Neoephemera antiqua is an extinct species of square-gill mayfly in the family Neoephemeridae that is known from early Eocene, Ypresian stage, lake deposits near the small community of Republic in Ferry County, Washington, USA.

== History and classification ==
Neoephemera antiqua is known only from one fossil, the holotype, number "UWBM76324". It is a single, mostly complete naiad of undetermined sex, preserved as a compression fossil in fine grained shale. The fossil specimen is from the University of Washington site number UWBM A0307B which works sediments from the Tom thumb tuff member of the Klondike Mountain Formation. Outcrops of the formation are found in and around Republic. The type specimen is currently preserved in the paleoentomology collections housed in the Burke Museum of Natural History and Culture, part of the University of Washington in Seattle, Washington, USA. N. antiqua was first studied by Nina D. Sinitchenkova of the Paleontological Institute of the Russian Academy of Sciences, with her 1999 type description being published in the Russian text Palaeontological Journal. The specific epithet antiqua was coined from the Latin "antiquus", meaning old.

When the holotype of Neoephemera antiqua was first described by Sinitchenkova, The Klondike Mountain Formation as assigned a Middle Eocene age. Further refinement of the dating has resulted in the formation being given a slightly older age, placing it in the Ypresian stage of the late Early Eocene. Neoephemera antiqua is the oldest known occurrence of the family Neoephemeridae, being older than the Oligocene species Potamanthellus rubiens, described from Montana in 1977 by Standley Lewis.

== Description ==
The compression fossil of the naiad is preserved dorsal side up and is nearly complete, only missing the head, ends of the fore and middle legs, and the ends of the three caudal filaments. The full naiad is estimated to have been 8.5 millimetres (0.33 in) in length, and is distinguishable from other species of neoepherids by is shorter pronotum and the structure of the posterior margins of the abdominal segments. The side margins of the pronotum are moderately dilated. The gill opercula have a diagonal rib and the anterolateral angles of the mesonotum have distance processes. Both of these features are only found in the modern genus Neoephemera leading to the placement of the fossil species in the genus.
