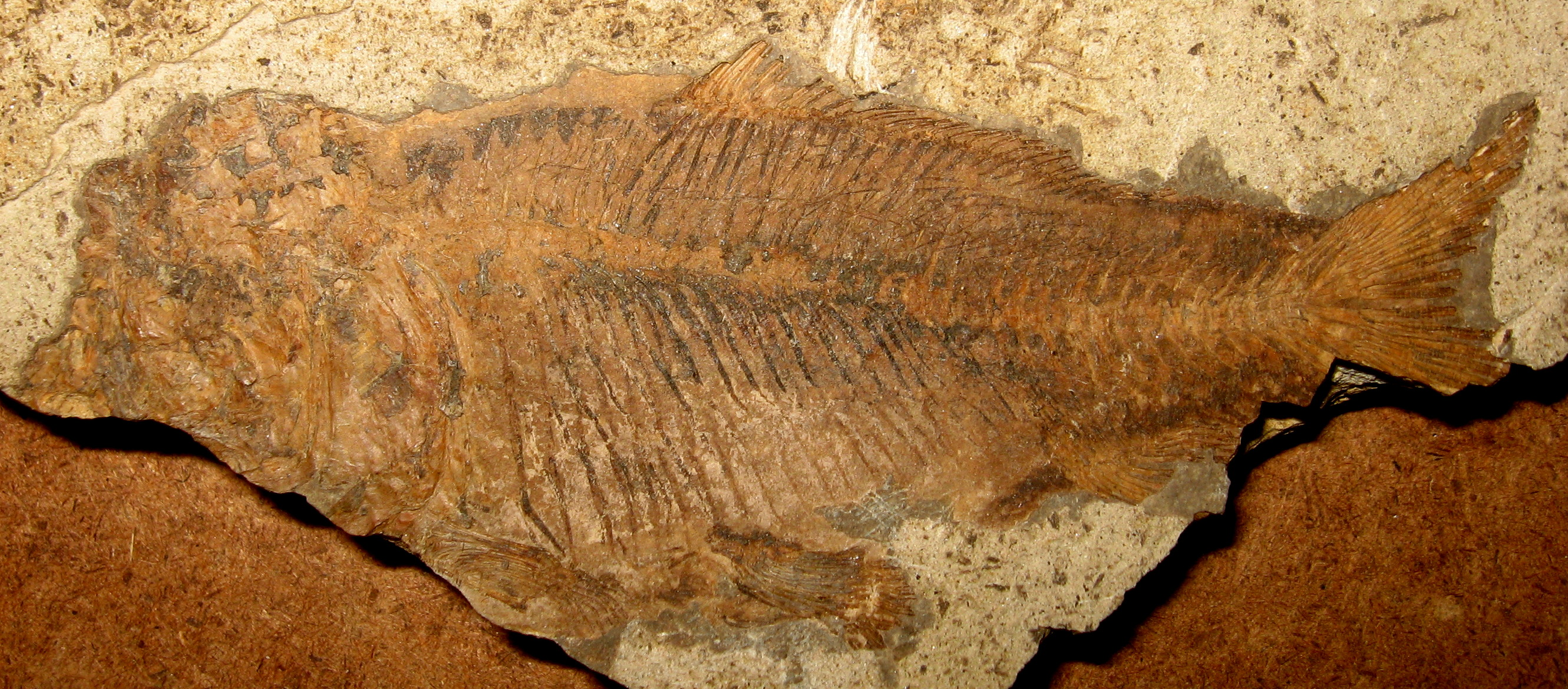
- 10 cm (3.9 in) A. aggregatum fossil

Scientific classification
- Kingdom: Animalia
- Phylum: Chordata
- Class: Actinopterygii
- Order: Cypriniformes
- Family: Catostomidae
- Subfamily: Ictiobinae
- Genus: †Amyzon; Cope, 1872

Type species
- †Amyzon mentale Cope, 1872

Species
- See text

= Amyzon (fish) =

Amyzon Temporal range: Middle Eocene–Oligocene

Extinct genus of fishes

Amyzon is an extinct genus of cypriniform fish in the sucker family Catostomidae first described in 1872 by E. D. Cope. There are six valid species in the genus. Amyzon are found in North American fossil sites dated from the Early Eocene in Montana and Washington USA, as well as the British Columbian sites at McAbee Fossil Beds, Driftwood Canyon, and the "Horsefly shales", as well as Early Oligocene sites in Nevada USA. One Middle Eocene species is known from the Xiawanpu Formation of China. The Ypresian species A. brevipinne of the Allenby Formation was redescribed in 2021 and moved to a separate monotypic genus Wilsonium.

== Species ==
There are six valid species included in Amyzon with up to nine species having been described.

- A. aggregatum Wilson, 1977 Early Eocene (Ypresian), Horsefly Beds, Horsefly, B.C.
- A. commune (Cope, 1874) late Eocene Florissant Formation, Colorado (junior synonyms A. fusiforme Cope, 1875 & A. pandatum Cope, 1874 )
- A. gosiutensis Grande, Eastman, & Cavender, 1982 Eocene Green River Formation
- A. hunanensis (Cheng, 1962) Middle Eocene, Xiawanpu Formation, China
- A. kishenehnicum Liu, Wilson, & Murray, 2016, Eocene, Kishenehn Formation, Montana
- A. mentale Cope, 1872 Oligocene, Osino Oil Shales, Nevada

Moved from Amyzon

- A. brevipinne Cope, 1894 moved to Wilsonium brevipinne (Cope, 1894), Early Eocene, Allenby Formation, Tulameen River, British Columbia
