= Boniodendron minus =

Conservation status
- Vulnerable (IUCN 3.1)

Scientific classification
- Kingdom: Plantae
- Clade: Tracheophytes
- Clade: Angiosperms
- Clade: Eudicots
- Clade: Rosids
- Order: Sapindales
- Family: Sapindaceae
- Genus: Boniodendron
- Species: B. minus

Binomial name
- Boniodendron minus (Hemsl.) T.C.Chen

Synonyms
- Koelreuteria minor Hemsl.; Sinoradlkofera minor (Hemsl.) F.G.Mey.

Species of flowering plant

Boniodendron minus is a species of plant in the family Sapindaceae. It is native to China and Vietnam.

== Conservation ==
Boniodendron minus was assessed as "vulnerable" in the 1998 IUCN Red List, where it is said to be native only to Vietnam. As of February 2023, Plants of the World Online gives it a wider distribution, including Yunnan to Hunan in China.
