= Klondikia =

Klondikia Temporal range: 49.42 Ma Ypresian

Scientific classification
- Domain: Eukaryota
- Kingdom: Animalia
- Phylum: Arthropoda
- Class: Insecta
- Order: Hymenoptera
- Family: Formicidae
- Genus: †Klondikia
- Species: †K. whiteae

Binomial name
- †Klondikia whiteae Dlussky & Rasnitsyn, 2002

Extinct genus of ants

Klondikia is an extinct hymenopteran genus in the ant family Formicidae with a single described species Klondikia whiteae. The species is solely known from the Early Eocene sediments exposed in northeast Washington state, United States. The genus is currently not placed into any ant subfamily, being treated as incertae sedis.

== History and classification ==
Klondikia whiteae was identified from two type specimens, the holotype male, number SR 94-05-07 and paratype female, number SR 94-04-24 and both compression fossils are preserved in the Stonerose Interpretive Center paleoentomological collection. The holotype was found at the Klondike Mountain Formations UWBM site B4131, which is designated the type locality, while the paratype was from site B4599 north of Republic at Mt Elizabeth. The fossils were described by myrmecologists Gennady Dlussky and Alexandr Rasnitsyn (2002) who picked the genus name Klondikia as a reference to the Klondike Mountain Formation, and coined the specific epithet as a matronym honoring Pat White who found the holotype.

Dlussky and Rasnitsyn noted in the type description that while the holotype male and paratype female were found in separate outcrops of the Klondike Mountain Formation, they felt the two shared enough similarities to be considered from the same species. K. whiteae males differ from the Ypresian Green River Formations species Eoformica pinguis in notably more sclerotized reproductive stipes, while the K. whiteae female has a shorter alitrunk and differing head proportions. E. pinguis females have heads wider than long, while in K. whiteae the head is longer than wide.

== Distribution and paleoecology ==
Klondikia whiteae is known from two locations in the Eocene Okanagan Highlands, both outcrops of the Ypresian Klondike Mountain Formation in and north of Republic. The formation preserves an upland lake system surrounded by a mixed conifer–broadleaf forest with nearby volcanism. The pollen flora has notable elements of birch and golden larch, and distinct trace amounts of fir, spruce, cypress, and palm. Wolfe and Tanai (1987) interpreted the forest climate to have been microthermal, having distinct seasonal temperature swings which dipped below freezing in the winters. However further study has shown the lake system was surrounded by a warm temperate ecosystem that likely had a mesic upper microthermal to lower mesothermal climate, in which winter temperatures rarely dropped low enough for snow, and which were seasonably equitable. The Okanagan highlands paleoforest surrounding the lakes have been described as precursors to the modern temperate broadleaf and mixed forests of Eastern North America and Eastern Asia. Based on the fossil biotas the lakes were higher and cooler than the coeval coastal forests preserved in the Puget Group and Chuckanut Formation of Western Washington, which are described as lowland tropical forest ecosystems. Estimates of the paleoelevation range between 0.7–1.2 km (0.43–0.75 mi) higher than the coastal forests. This is consistent with the paleoelevation estimates for the lake systems, which range between 1.1–2.9 km (1,100–2,900 m), which is similar to the modern elevation 0.8 km (0.50 mi), but higher.

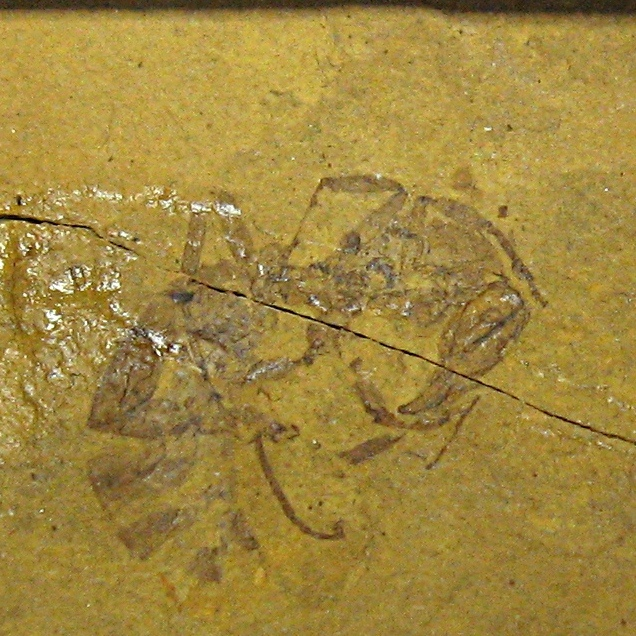
Myrmeciites sp.

Estimates of the mean annual temperature for the Klondike Mountain Formation have been derived from climate leaf analysis multivariate program (CLAMP) analysis and leaf margin analysis (LMA) of the Republic paleoflora. The CLAMP results after multiple linear regressions for Republic gave a mean annual temperature of approximately 8.0 °C (46.4 °F), while the LMA gave 9.2 ± 2.0 °C (48.6 ± 3.6 °F). This is lower than the mean annual temperature estimates given for the coastal Puget Group, which is estimated to have been between 15–18.6 °C (59.0–65.5 °F). The bioclimatic analysis for Republic suggests mean annual precipitation amounts of 115 ± 39 cm (45 ± 15 in).

Klondikia whiteae is one of four ants described from in and around Republic. Two other fossils have been placed as members of the subfamily Myrmeciinae, the species Propalosoma gutierrezae and one identified to the form genus Myrmeciites. The fourth species was first described as a member of the carpenter ant genus Camponotus but was moved to the weaver ant genus Oecophylla as Oecophylla kraussei in 2017.

== Description ==
The known male of Klondikia whiteae has a 4.8 mm (0.19 in) body with 2.05 mm (0.081 in) alitrunk and small petiole of subtrapizoidal outline. The antennae have filiform funiculi attached to a curved scape approximately as long as the head width. The gaster has "massive" genital stipes which sport rounded tops and a small denticle in the center. Both the male and female have rather thick short legs. The female's body is slightly longer than the male's at 5.5 mm (0.22 in) with a 1.31 mm (0.052 in) alitrunk. The small petiole is similar to the male's, with a subtrapizoidal outline in side profile. The female's head is rectangular, slightly longer than wide and has rounded rear margins above the eye sockets. As with the male's antennae, the female's antennae have scapes curved in the basal area.
