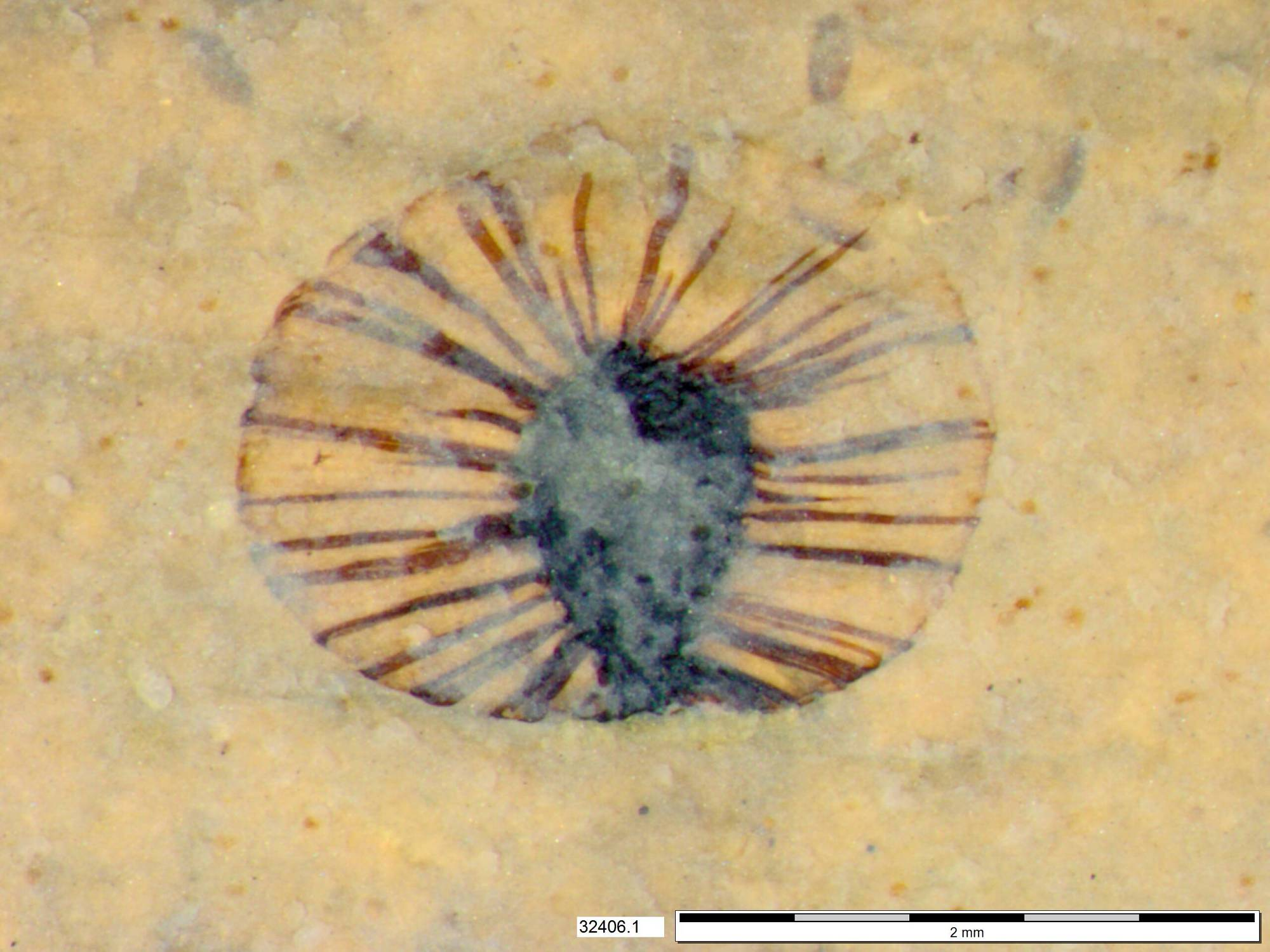
- Holotype Kishenehn Formation specimen

Scientific classification
- Kingdom: Plantae
- Clade: Embryophytes
- Clade: Tracheophytes
- Clade: Spermatophytes
- Clade: Angiosperms
- Order: incertae sedis
- Genus: †Pteroheterochrosperma
- Species: †P. horseflyensis

Binomial name
- †Pteroheterochrosperma horseflyensis Smith, Greenwalt, & Manchester

= Pteroheterochrosperma =

Pteroheterochrosperma Temporal range: Eocene

Fossil genus of flowering plants

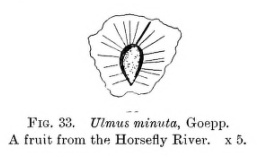
1908 illustration of the Horsefly specimen

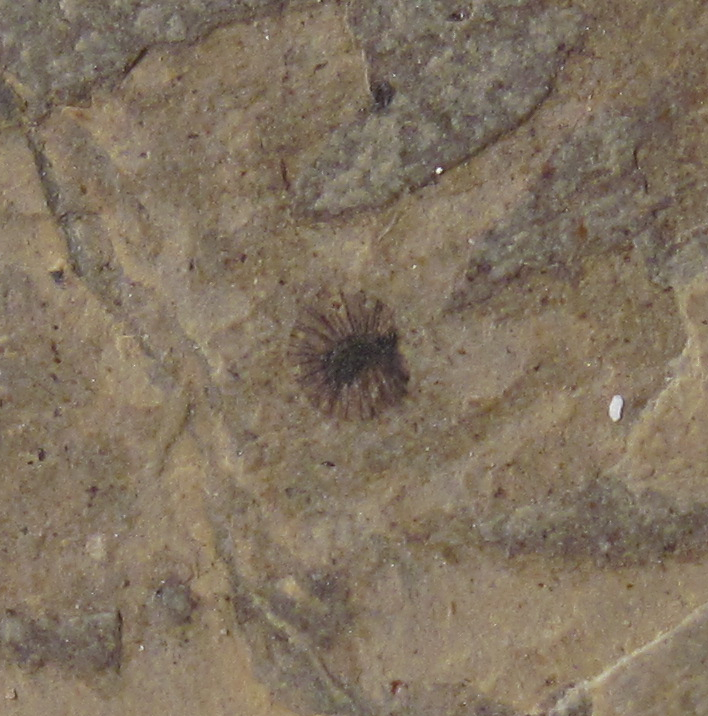
Republic, Washington, specimen

Pteroheterochrosperma is an extinct genus of angiosperm known only from isolated seeds. Its sole species is Pteroheterochrosperma horseflyensis. The species is named after the Canadian community of Horsefly, British Columbia, where the fossil was found. Additional occurrences for the seeds have been reported from near Cache Creek, British Columbia; Republic, Washington; and the Middle Fork Flathead River, Montana. Fossils were initially found in 1906 by the Lawrence Lambes expedition along the Horsefly River, and reported in 1908 by David P. Penhallow as "Ulmus minuta" fruits. Further study published in 2023 determined the fossils to be distinct from elms, and were renamed as a result. Discussion of the fossils in a PhD dissertation suggested the genus as a possible relative to the cruciferous genus Boechera.

== Distribution ==
Pteroheterochrosperma horseflyensis was first reported from the Horsefly Shales in the Horsefly River valley of central eastern British Columbia. Further Eocene Okanagan Highlands occurrences have been found in the Tranquille Formation at the McAbee Fossil Beds near Cache Creek, British Columbia and the Klondike Mountain Formation around Republic, Washington. All three formations are of similar age, with radiometric dating at McAbee and Republic placing the sites in the Late Ypresian of the Early Eocene. While dating has not been performed on the undescribed shales of Horsefly, both floral and faunal correlations between the other Eocene Okanagan highlands sites confidently correlate all the sites.

The only known occurrence outside of the Eocene Okanagan Highlands was reported in 2023. A single fossil was recovered from the Kishenehn Formation's "Dakin Site" on the Middle Fork Flathead River in Flathead County, Montana. This occurrence is younger than that of the others, being confidently placed around 44 Myr old and within the Lutetian of the Middle Eocene.

== History and classification ==
The oldest mentions of these fruits come from the detailed description of Lawrence Lambe's expeditions through the greater Central British Columbian region from Horsefly southeast to Princeton. Within the fossil material from Horsefly were "a few" fossils of minute fruits that Penhallow had not seen before. While giving them a brief description and providing an illustration of one, it was not named as a new species. Instead, based on the finding of several small elm leaves, Penhallow placed both leaf and fruit fossils into the European species Ulmus minuta. This placement was not questioned for over a century, with report of the fossils at Republic by Wesley Wehr and Kathleen Pigg in 2002 not mentioning the prior record at all.

In 2023, graduate student MacKenzie A. Smith, in collaboration with Steven Manchester and David Greenwalt, reported on a 2018 find for the fruits in the Kishenehn Formation of Montana. They noted that Penhallow's placement in the European species was problematic, with the original description by Heinrich Göppert only including leaves, not fruit. Ulmus minuta was deemed a junior synonym of Ulmus pyramidalis, described by Göppert from the same site, by Irina Iljinskaja and that species is a junior homonym to the living species Ulmus glabra.

Additionally, as noted by Penhallow, the north American fossils are smaller than all known elm fruits. Given they lack the wing venation and style morphology now seen as diagnostic for the genus, Smith et al. determined the fruits to not be elm relatives at all. However, since the names that had been applied to the fossils were already all dedicated to leaf taxa and not available for the fruits, a new species name was needed. Given the identifiable characters of the fossils, Smith et al. were not able to identify any family or order relationships for the fossils, leaving the affiliations to other flowering plants obscure. As such, they chose to erect a new genus, as well as giving the fossils a formal species description and name, while leaving the genus unplaced within Angiospermae. They coined the new genus name Pteroheterochrosperma as a combination of the Greek words ptero- meaning "wing", -heterochros- meaning "variegated" plus -sperma meaning "seed" which they translate as "variegated winged seed". They picked the species name horseflyensis in reference to the original fossils being from Horsefly. While Smith et al. (2023) did not place the genus to any angiosperm group, Smith did posit a possible relationship in their PhD dissertation. In the discussion of Pteroheterochrosperma, Smith suggests that a possible modern relation to be the brassicaceous genus Boechera.

== Description ==
Pteroheterochrosperma horseflyensis disseminules are comprised of very small seeds surrounded by a wing-like membrane. The specimen described from Horsefly by Penhallow (1908) had an ovate fruit of 1.75 mm (0.069 in) in height and 1 mm (0.039 in) in width, while the Kishenehn specimen possesses an obovate outline and is described as having a minutely wrinkled surface texturing. Its smaller than the Horsefly specimen with proportions of 1.28 mm (0.050 in) by only 0.77 mm (0.030 in). Both specimens have an orbicular to elliptical wing-like membrane enclosing the seeds body. Again, the Kishenehn specimen is smaller than the Horsefly specimen at 2.1 mm × 2.7 mm (0.083 in × 0.106 in) versus 3 mm × 3.75 mm (0.118 in × 0.148 in). The wing membranes have numerous veins radiating out from the seed body towards the membrane edges, with the majority reaching the edges and terminating. Some veins do not reach the edges, while some others are forked into two parallel veins. The Kishenehn fossil has an estimated 27 veins and a few are noted to fork into three veins.

== Paleoenvironment ==
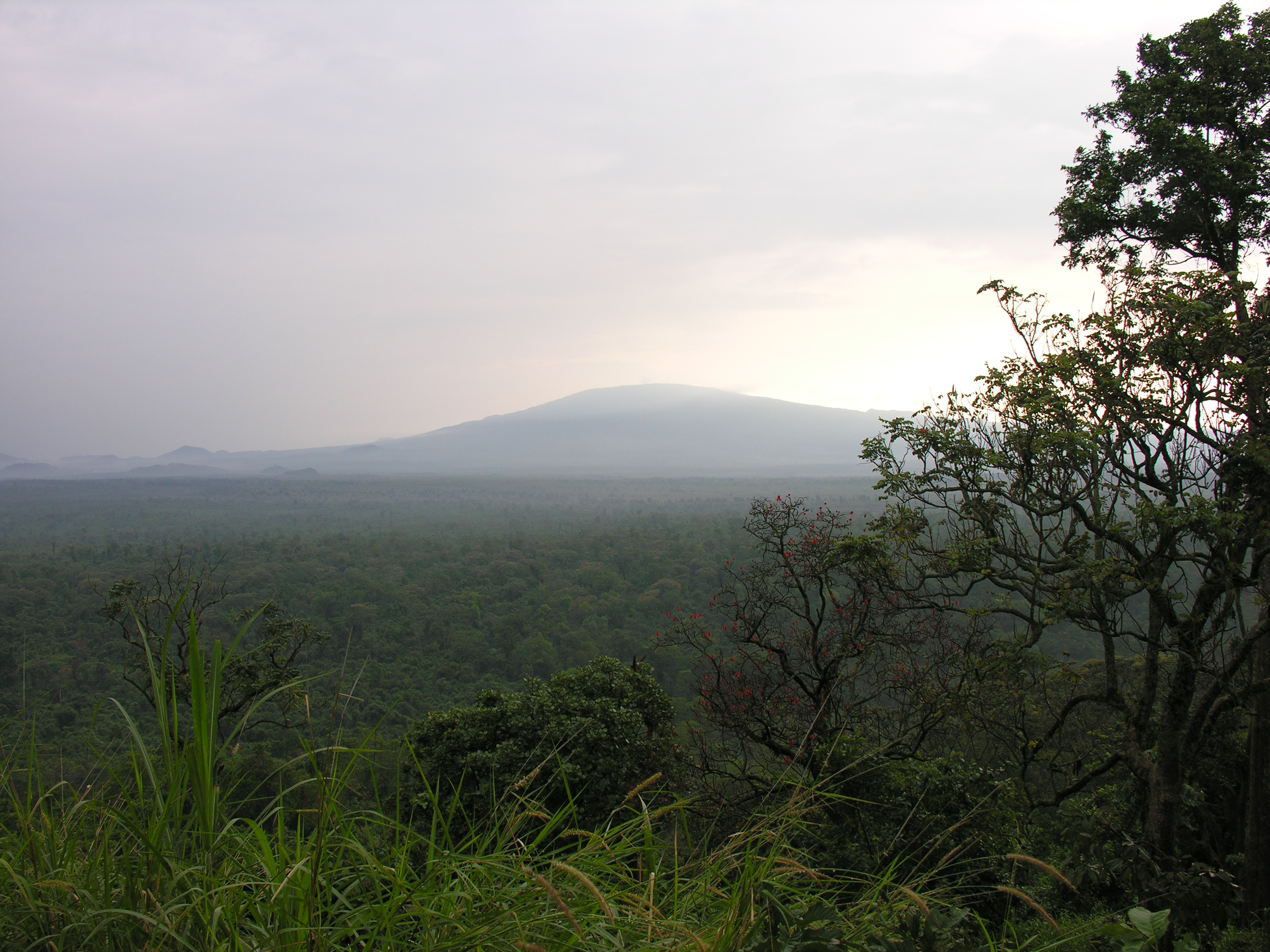
Virunga National Park, Albertine Rift, Democratic Republic of the Congo

The Republic, McAbee and Horsefly sites are part of a larger fossil site system collectively known as the Eocene Okanagan Highlands. The highlands, including the Early Eocene formations between Driftwood Canyon at the north and Republic at the south, have been described as one of the "Great Canadian Lagerstätten" based on the diversity, quality and unique nature of the paleofloral and paleofaunal biotas that are preserved. The highlands temperate biome preserved across a large transect of lakes recorded many of the earliest appearances of modern genera, while also documenting the last stands of ancient lines. The warm temperate highland floras, in association with downfaulted lacustrine basins and active volcanism, are noted to have no exact modern equivalents. This is due to the more seasonally equitable conditions of the Early Eocene, resulting in much lower seasonal temperature shifts. However, the highlands have been compared to the upland ecological islands of the Virunga Mountains within the African rift valley's Albertine Rift.

The Klondike Mountain Formation represents the pinpoint spot along an upland lake system series that was surrounded by a warm temperate ecosystem with nearby volcanism dating from during and just after the early Eocene climatic optimum. The Okanagan Highlands likely had a mesic upper microthermal to lower mesothermal climate, in which winter temperatures rarely dropped low enough for snow, and which were seasonably equitable. The paleoforest surrounding the lakes have been described as precursors to the modern temperate broadleaf and mixed forests of Eastern North America and Eastern Asia. Based on the fossil biotas, the lakes were higher and cooler then the coeval coastal forests preserved in the Puget Group and Chuckanut Formation of Western Washington, which are described as lowland tropical forest ecosystems. Estimates of the paleoelevation range between 0.7 and 1.2 km (0.43 and 0.75 mi) higher than the coastal forests. This is consistent with the paleoelevation estimates for the lake systems, which range between 1.1 and 2.9 km (1,100 and 2,900 m), which is similar to the modern elevation of 0.8 km (0.50 mi), but higher.

Estimates of the mean annual temperature have been derived from climate leaf analysis multivariate program (CLAMP) analysis of the Republic paleoflora, while bioclimatic and mutual climate range analyses (BA/MCRA) was used for the Kishenehn paleoflora. The CLAMP results after multiple linear regressions for Republic gave a mean annual temperature of approximately 8.0 °C (46.4 °F), with the leaf margin analysis giving 9.2 ± 2.0 °C (48.6 ± 3.6 °F). BA/MCRA on the Republic flora suggested a mean annual temperatures around 13.5 ± 2.2 °C (56.3 ± 4.0 °F). BA/MCRA results for the Kishenehn flora returned 8.91–12.10 °C (48.04–53.78 °F), with wider temperature change between summer and winter, with average annual low temperatures around −5.00–0.5 °C (23.00–32.90 °F), averaging around −1.5 °C (29.3 °F), lower than Republic estimates. The bioclimatic analysis for Republic and Kishenehn suggest mean annual precipitation amounts of 115 ± 39 cm (45 ± 15 in) and 945–1,204 cm (372–474 in) respectively.

The Kishenehn paleolake is thought to have been surrounded by a dense forest environment, which is supported by the presence of taxa like Juniperus which are often found in low light environments, and faunal elements such as the long-bodied cranefly †Cyttaromyia lynnae and a number of arboreal mammals. The forest experienced distinct seasonality, unlike the older Republic flora, having a warm summer in which the majority of the annual precipitation happened, and a cold winter, with temperatures dipping below freezing. The climate of the surrounding lake basin is suggested to have possibly been moderated by a black-body effect from the lake, in which the water mass provided warmer average temperature levels. Smith et al. do note that their climate estimates may be problematic, with the annual low temperatures being problematic due to fossils of both subtropical insects and teeth from undescribed crocodilians coming from the formation.
