= Neoephemera purpurea =

Scientific classification
- Domain: Eukaryota
- Kingdom: Animalia
- Phylum: Arthropoda
- Class: Insecta
- Order: Ephemeroptera
- Family: Neoephemeridae
- Genus: Neoephemera
- Species: N. purpurea

Binomial name
- Neoephemera purpurea (Traver, 1931)

Synonyms
- Oreianthus purpureus Traver, 1931

Species of mayfly

Neoephemera purpurea is a species of large squaregill mayfly in the family Neoephemeridae. It is found in North America.
