= Boniodendron =

Scientific classification
- Kingdom: Plantae
- Clade: Tracheophytes
- Clade: Angiosperms
- Clade: Eudicots
- Clade: Rosids
- Order: Sapindales
- Family: Sapindaceae
- Subfamily: Dodonaeoideae
- Genus: Boniodendron; Gagnep.

Synonyms
- Sinoradlkofera F.G.Mey.

Genus of plants

Boniodendron is a genus of plant in the family Sapindaceae. It contains the following species:

- Boniodendron minus (Hemsl.) T.C.Chen
- Boniodendron parviflorum (Lecomte) Gagnep.
