= Rolf Mathewes =

Canadian paleoecologist and professor

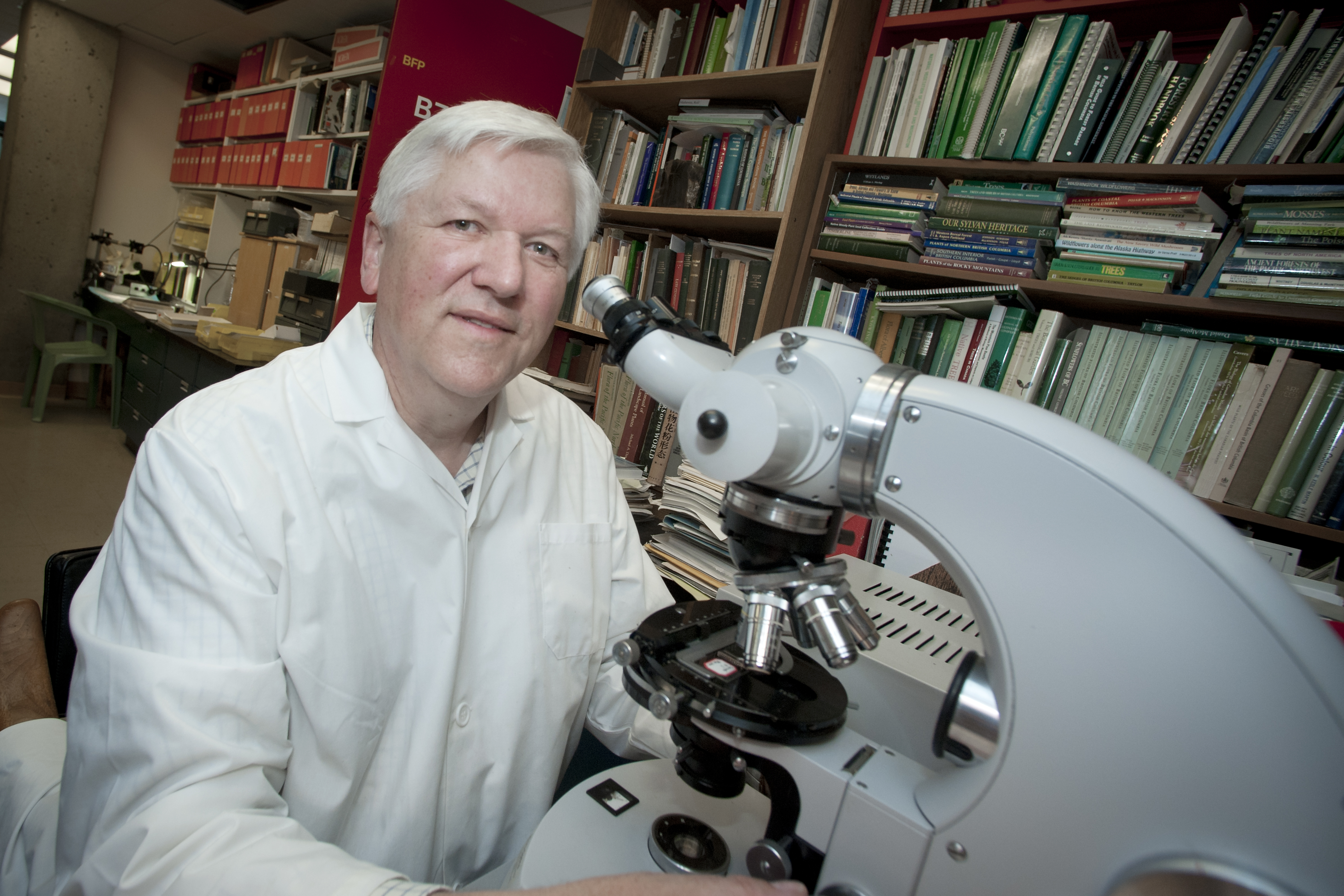
- Mathewes in 2010
- Born: Surrey, British Columbia, Canada
- Spouse: Donna
- Children: 2

Academic background
- Education: B.S.c, 1969, Simon Fraser University; PhD., Botany, 1973, University of British Columbia; Postdoc, Cambridge University
- Thesis: Paleoecology of postglacial sediments in the Fraser Lowland region of British Columbia (1973)

Academic work
- Institutions: Simon Fraser University

Rolf Walter Mathewes is a Canadian paleoecologist. He is a full professor and former associate dean of science at Simon Fraser University.

== Education ==
Mathewes attended Princess Margaret Secondary School and was taught biology by Rene Savenye. He earned his Bachelor of Science from Simon Fraser University before achieving his PhD at the University of British Columbia.

== Career ==
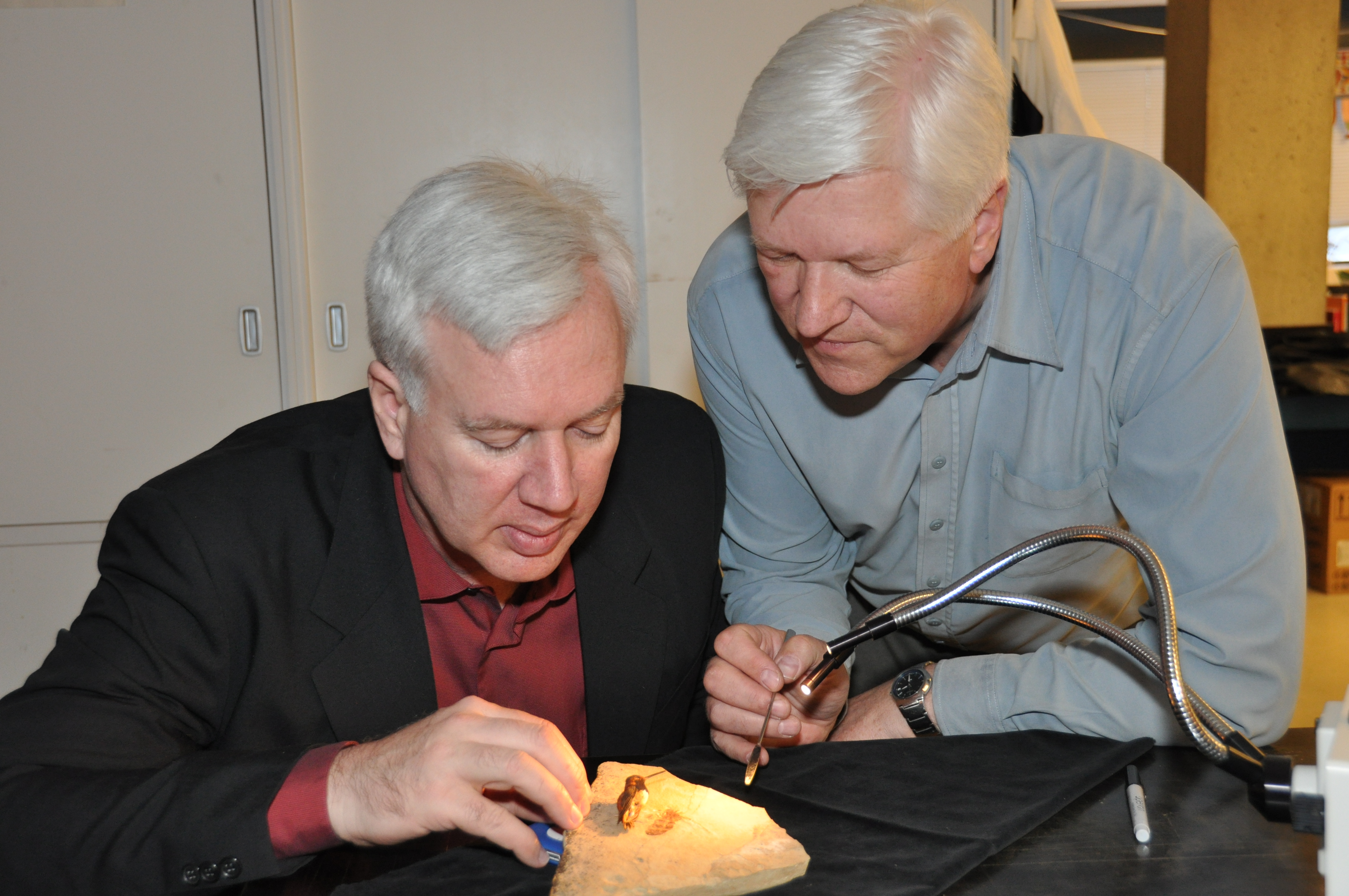
Bruce Archibald and Mathewes in 2011

Mathewes joined the Faculty of Biological Sciences at Simon Fraser University in 1975. He was promoted to Associate Professor in 1982 before becoming a full professor in 1987. A few years later, he served a three year term as Associate Chair of Biology and was elected president of the American Association of Stratigraphic Palynolygists. On August 1, 2000, he was appointed Associate Dean of Science at Simon Fraser University. In 2001, he co-published "Late Quaternary paleoenvironments of Northwestern North America: implications for inland versus coastal migration routes."

In 2004, Mathewes was repeatedly contacted by the Vancouver Police Department to analyze evidence at the crime scene. A few years later, in 2007, he was part of a group of researchers working at Simon Fraser University's Centre for Forensic Studies.

In 2011, Mathewes was honoured with Simon Fraser University's Outstanding Alumni Award. A few years later, while collaborating with Bruce Archibald and researchers from Naturmuseum Senckenberg, he discovered three extinct fossil species of big-headed flies. Only one of the fossils was well-enough preserved to be named as a new species. In 2019, Mathewes was part of an archeology team that discovered proof of life in Haida Gwaii that dated back 13,000 years, which indicated that the land was occupied approximately 2,200 years prior to the previous estimates of 10,000 to 10,800 years ago.
