= Calycites =

Calycites Temporal range: Cretaceous–Paleogene
- Calycites ardtunensis

Scientific classification
- Kingdom: Plantae
- Clade: Tracheophytes
- Clade: Angiosperms
- Order: incertae sedis
- Genus: †Calycites; A. Massalongo, 1850

Species
- see text

Form genus for fossil flowers

Calycites is an extinct form genus of flowering plant used as a dustbin for fossil flowers of uncertain relationship.

== Species ==
The following species are assigned to this genus:

- Calycites alatus Hollick, 1904
- Calycites ardtunensis Crane, 1988
- Calycites davillaformis E.W.Berry, 1916
- Calycites diospyriformis Newberry, 1895
- Calycites hydrangeoides Krassilov, 2005
- Calycites lythroides Krassilov, 2005 (junior homonym)
- Calycites lythroides Visiani & Massalongo, 1856 (Sr homonym)
- Calycites middendorfensis E.W.Berry, 1914
- Calycites obovatus Hollick, 1906
- Calycites ostryaformis E.W.Berry, 1916
- Calycites parvus Newberry, 1895
- Calycites pentasepalus Massalongo, 1850
- Calycites polysepala Newberry, 1868
- Calycites puryearensis E.W.Berry, 1930
- Calycites quinquesepalus Menzel, 1913
- Calycites rhizophoroides E.W.Berry, 1930
- Calycites ripleyensis E.W.Berry, 1925
- Calycites sexpartitus E.W.Berry, 1919
- Calycites verbenaceus Menzel, 1913

Species moved to other genera:

- Calycites hexaphylla Lesq., 1873 moved to Diospyros hexaphylla (Lesq.) Knowlt., 1920
- Calycites mikanoides MacGinitie, 1941 moved to Macginistemon mikanoides (MacGinitie) Manchester, 1986
- Calycites milanensis E.W.Berry, 1930 jr synonym to Heisteria sapindifolium (Hollick) Berry, 1938
