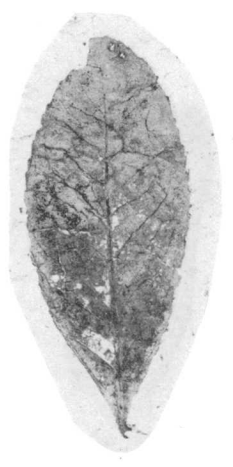

Scientific classification
- Kingdom: Plantae
- Clade: Tracheophytes
- Clade: Angiosperms
- Clade: Eudicots
- Clade: Asterids
- Order: Ericales
- Family: Pentaphylacaceae
- Genus: †Ternstroemites; E.W.Berry, 1916

= Ternstroemites =

Ternstroemites Temporal range: Cretaceous–Eocene

Extinct tea genus

Ternstroemites is an extinct tea relative from the Ravenian (late Eocene). The fossil was found near Puryear, Henry County, Tennessee. Ternstroemites is a form genus for Theaceae-like leaves.

== Species ==
The following species have been described.

- Ternstroemites aureavallis
- Ternstroemites bockwitzensis
- Ternstroemites claibornensis
- Ternstroemites crassus
- Ternstroemites cretaceus
- Ternstroemites crowleyensis
- Ternstroemites dentatus
- Ternstroemites diversifolius
- Ternstroemites egeriae
- Ternstroemites engelhardtii
- Ternstroemites eoligniticus
- Ternstroemites floersheimensis
- Ternstroemites harwoodensis
- Ternstroemites idahoensis
- Ternstroemites kamtschaticus
- Ternstroemites klettwitzensis
- Ternstroemites lanceolatus
- Ternstroemites longifolius
- Ternstroemites magdae
- Ternstroemites neueweltensis
- Ternstroemites ovatus
- Ternstroemites palibinii
- Ternstroemites pereger
- Ternstroemites preclaibornensis
- Ternstroemites ravenensis
- Ternstroemites ripleyensis
- Ternstroemites shapiroi
- Ternstroemites sokolovensis
- Ternstroemites stiriacus
- Ternstroemites texensis
- Ternstroemites variabilis
- Ternstroemites viridiflumensis
- Ternstroemites waltheri
- Ternstroemites woodbinensis
