= Republica weatbrooki =

- holotype wing

Scientific classification
- Kingdom: Animalia
- Phylum: Arthropoda
- Clade: Pancrustacea
- Class: Insecta
- Order: Odonata
- Suborder: Zygoptera
- Family: Euphaeidae
- Genus: †Republica
- Species: †R. weatbrooki

Binomial name
- †Republica weatbrooki Archibald & Cannings, 2022

Genus of damselflies

Republica is an extinct zygopteran genus in the damselfly family Euphaeidae with a single described species, Republica weatbrooki. The species is solely known from the Early Eocene sediments exposed in the northeast of the U.S. state of Washington.

== Distribution ==
Republica weatbrooki is known from a single location in the Eocene Okanagan Highlands, an outcrop of the Ypresian Klondike Mountain Formation in Republic. The holotype was recovered from the UWBM site B4131, which is designated the type locality, on May 24, 2006. Modern work on the fossil-bearing strata of the formation via radiometrically dating has given an estimated age in the Late Ypresian stage of the early Eocene, between 49.4 ± .5 million years ago at the youngest, with an oldest age estimate of 51.2 ± 0.1 million years ago, given based on detrital zircon isotopic data published in 2021.

== History and classification ==
Republica weatbrooki was identified from only the type specimen, the holotype, number SR 06–59–08, which is a compression fossil preserved in the Stonerose Interpretive Center paleoentomological collection. The holotype was found at the Klondike Mountain Formations "B4131" locality, also called the "Boot hill" site. The fossil was described by paleontologist S. Bruce Archibald and entomologist Robert Cannings in 2021 and they coined the specific epithet weatbrooki as a patronym honoring Alex Weatbrook who found the fossil and donated it to Stonerose. They chose the genus name as a Latinized feminine form of the city name Republic.

Archibald and Cannings (2022) placed the new genus into the damselfly family Euphaeidae, extending the known range of the fossil lineage in the family to the Ypresian northwestern North American. The placement was based on the angle and thickened appearance in the quadrangle cells distal wall, densely reticulate venation, plus a smoothly "S"-curved CuA vein, which match Euphaeidae while being contrary to the family Zacallitidae. Within Euphaeidae, Republica was placed in subfamily Eodichromatinae based on the presence of enlarged and thickened Ax1 and Ax2 veins near the base of the wing. Of the members of Eodichromatinae, the closest genus to Republic seems to be Labandeiraia, known from Ypresian species described from the Green River Formation in North America and the Fur Formation and Oise Amber in Europe. Modern Euphaeidae species are found in the Australasian, Indomalayan, and Palearctic biogeographic realms, while the known fossil record restricted to Europe and North America.

With the naming of the genus, Archibald and Cannings created a hemihomonym. The damselfly is the second Klondike Mountain Formation genus named Republica with the enigmatic plant Republica being named by Jack Wolfe and Wesley Wehr in 1987.

== Description ==
Major damselfly wing veins

The only known forewing is 40.7 mm (1.60 in) long and 10.4 mm (0.41 in) at its widest giving it a length to width ratio of 3.9, narrower than several other eodichromatines. The length between wing base and nodus is 14.0 mm (0.55 in) while the length to pterostigma is 33.3 mm (1.31 in). The pterostigma is elongate, being 4.0 mm (0.16 in) long and only 0.7 mm (0.028 in) wide, and has slanted cell walls on both the basal and apical sides.

Due to poor preservation of the finer venation of the wing, many of the delicate crossveins between more robust major veins are missing making total vein counts impossible from the holotype. The space between the Costa, which forms the frontal wing edge, and the Subcosta has at least 26 crossveins and likely more, all positioned between the Ax1 crossvein near the wing base and the nodus. Both the An isolated crossvein is present between the Ax1 and Ax2 veins of the other C-Sc space, both of which are distinctly more robust than any crossveins in the space.

The wing was possibly slightly darkened across the basal region of the wing, with a lighter to hyaline window across the apical 1/3 of the wing surrounding a darkened tip area. However Archibald and Cannings noted the possibility of this "coloration" being a result of preservation artifacts and not coloration during life.

== Paleoenvironment ==
Republica distribution

The formation preserves an upland lake system surrounded by a mixed conifer–broadleaf forest with nearby volcanism. The pollen flora has notable elements of birch and golden larch, and distinct trace amounts of fir, spruce, cypress, and palm. Wolfe and Tanai (1987) interpreted the forest climate to have been microthermal, having distinct seasonal temperature swings which dipped below freezing in the winters. However, further study has shown the lake system was surrounded by a warm temperate ecosystem that likely had a mesic upper microthermal to lower mesothermal climate, in which winter temperatures rarely dropped low enough for snow, and which were seasonably equitable.

The Okanagan highlands paleoforest surrounding the lakes have been described as precursors to the modern temperate broadleaf and mixed forests of Eastern North America and Eastern Asia. Based on the fossil biotas the lakes were higher and cooler than the coeval coastal forests preserved in the Puget Group and Chuckanut Formation of Western Washington, which are described as lowland tropical forest ecosystems. Estimates of the paleoelevation range between 0.7–1.2 km (0.43–0.75 mi) higher than the coastal forests. This is consistent with the paleoelevation estimates for the lake systems, which range between 1.1–2.9 km (1,100–2,900 m), which is similar to the modern elevation 0.8 km (0.50 mi), but higher.

Estimates of the mean annual temperature for the Klondike Mountain Formation have been derived from climate leaf analysis multivariate program (CLAMP) analysis and leaf margin analysis (LMA) of the Republic paleoflora. The CLAMP results after multiple linear regressions for Republic gave a mean annual temperature of approximately 8.0 °C (46.4 °F), while the LMA gave 9.2 ± 2.0 °C (48.6 ± 3.6 °F). This is lower than the mean annual temperature estimates given for the coastal Puget Group, which is estimated to have been between 15–18.6 °C (59.0–65.5 °F). The bioclimatic analysis for Republic suggests mean annual precipitation amounts of 115 ± 39 cm (45 ± 15 in).
