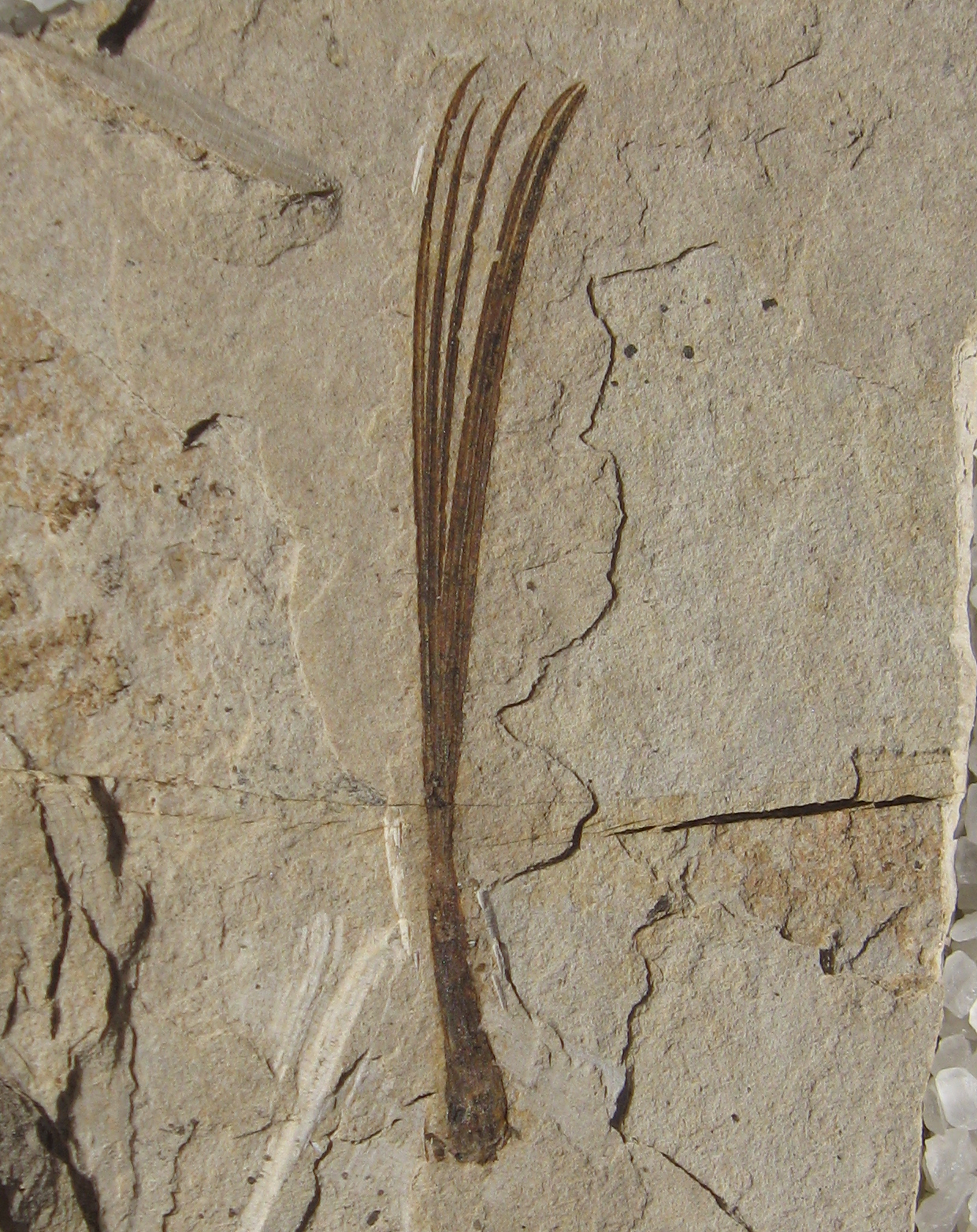
- P. latahensis needles SR 87-61-08

Scientific classification
- Kingdom: Plantae
- Clade: Tracheophytes
- Clade: Gymnosperms
- Division: Pinophyta
- Class: Pinopsida
- Order: Pinales
- Family: Pinaceae
- Genus: Pinus
- Species: †P. latahensis

Binomial name
- †Pinus latahensis Berry, 1929

= Pinus latahensis =

Pinus latahensis Temporal range: 49.5–49.5 Ma

Extinct species of conifer

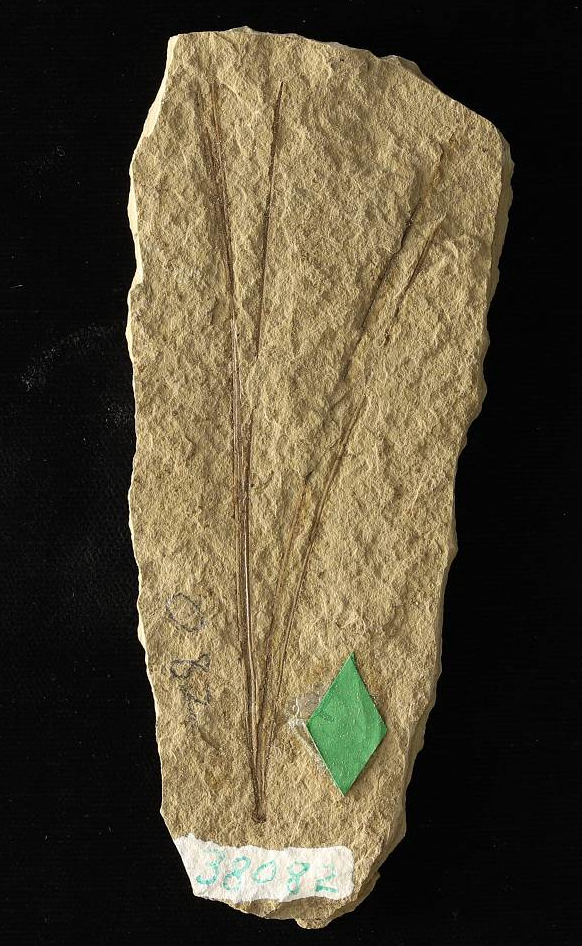
1929 holotype fossil

Pinus latahensis is an extinct species of conifer in the pine family Pinaceae. The species is known from fossil leaves found in the early Eocene deposits of northern Washington state, United States, and southern British Columbia, Canada.

== Age ==
Pinus latahensis was first documented by Edward W. Berry in 1929 based on a compression fossil recovered from shale outcrops in the Republic, Washington area. When published, the specimens type locality at Republic was misidentified as being an extension of the much younger Latah Formation, located southeast of Republic around the Spokane region, which was then considered to be of Late Miocene age. Roland W. Brown determined the Republic flora to be an older deposit and not part of the Latah formation in 1937. In a written communication c. 1958, Brown again revised the age still older, stating fossils found in the area of Mount Elizabeth, northeast of Republic indicated an Oligocene age. This age was followed by Herman Becker (1961) while discussing the Ruby Flora of Montana and Jack Wolfe (1965) in discussing the Fingerrock Wash Flora of Nevada. This age was also used by R.L. Parker and J. A. Calkins (1964) in their assessment of the Curlew Quadrangle of Ferry County.

Potassium-argon radiometric dating of samples taken near the Tom Thumb mine in 1966 resulted in a tentative age of 55 million years old. Further refinement of sample dating had yielded an approximately Early Eocene, Ypresian age, being radiometrically dated as 49.4 million years old. A 2003 report using dating of detrital zircon crystals with the tuffs of the Klondike Mountain Formation had been dated to 49.42 ± 0.54 million years ago, the youngest of the Okanagan Highlands sites, A 2021 report revised the possible oldest age to around 51.2 ± 0.1 million years ago based on isotopic data from zircon crystals.

== Distribution and paleoenvironment ==
In his 1955 review of conifer fossils found in the Princeton coal fields of British Columbia, Chester A. Arnold noted the marked similarities between the Klondike Mountain and Allenby Formations and interpreted the shared taxa of the formations to indicated that the Klondike Mountain Formation was of Oligocene age like the Allenby Formation was thought to be at the time. This similarity was also noted and commented on by Charles Miller (1975) who agreed the Republic and Princeton floras were coeval, and of Eocene age.

Both sites represent upland lake systems that were surrounded by a warm temperate ecosystem with nearby volcanism. The highlands likely had a mesic upper microthermal to lower mesothermal climate, in which winter temperatures rarely dropped low enough for snow, and which were seasonably equitable. The Okanagan highlands paleoforest surrounding the lakes have been described as precursors to the modern temperate broadleaf and mixed forests of Eastern North America and Eastern Asia. Based on the fossil biotas the lakes were higher and cooler then the coeval coastal forests preserved in the Puget Group and Chuckanut Formation of Western Washington, which are described as lowland tropical forest ecosystems. Estimates of the paleoelevation range between 0.7–1.2 km (0.43–0.75 mi) higher than the coastal forests. This is consistent with the paleoelevation estimates for the lake systems, which range between 1.1–2.9 km (1,100–2,900 m), which is similar to the modern elevation 0.8 km (0.50 mi), but higher.

Estimates of the mean annual temperature have been derived from climate leaf analysis multivariate program (CLAMP) analysis and leaf margin analysis (LMA) of both the Princeton and Republic paleofloras. The CLAMP results after multiple linear regressions for Republic gave a mean annual temperature of approximately 8.0 °C (46.4 °F), while the LMA gave 9.2 ± 2.0 °C (48.6 ± 3.6 °F). Princetons multiple linear regression CLAMP results gave a slightly lower 5.1 °C (41.2 °F), and the LMA returned a mean annual temperature of 5.1 ± 2.2 °C (41.2 ± 4.0 °F). This is lower than the mean annual temperature estimates given for the coastal Puget Group, which is estimated to have been between 15–18.6 °C (59.0–65.5 °F). The bioclimatic analysis for Republic and Prionceton suggest mean annual precipitation amounts of 115 ± 39 cm (45 ± 15 in) and 114 ± 42 cm (45 ± 17 in) respectively.

In his assessment of the Driftwood Canyon Provincial Park fossils, originating from an unnamed formation in the Ootsa Lake Group and northernmost of the Eocene Okanagan highlands lake system, Rolf Ludvigsen identified the compression 5-needle fossils as P. latahensis. At Driftwood creek, it co-occurs with the permineralized species Pinus driftwoodensis The needles at driftwood had also been tentatively identified as equivalent to the needles of Pinus arnoldii from the Princeton Chert by Ruth Stockey in a 1984 paper.

== Taxonomy and phylogeny ==
The type description given by Berry was brief, with an image of the holotype fossil printed in conjunction with three other pine species, Pinus macrophylla, Pinus monticolensis, and the dubious Pinus tetrafolia. Specimen USNM P38082 of the Smithsonians National Museum of Natural History collection is the designated species holotype, though Berry did not list it as such in the type description. Based on the erroneous assumption that the shales of Republic were part of the Latah formation Berry chose the species specific epithet latahensis.

In 1961, Becker discussed the taxonomy of P. latahensis in his monograph on the Oligocene Ruby basin flora of Southwestern Montana. Based on the assumption that the Klondike Mountain Formation was of Oligocene age, he placed several Ruby Basin fossils into a revised definition of P. monticolensis. Becker noted that the name P. latahensis was chosen to honor a formation of different age and location then the type locality, and so he opted to suggest synonymy of P. latahensis into P. monticolensis as a whole plant species definition. He noted that taxonomic priority would favor the use of the name P. latahensis over P. monticolensis, as it was the first species described in the 1929 publication, but chose to ignore the rule.

Three years later Jack Wolfe (1964) also briefly discussed P. latahensis this time in reference to Miocene fossils found of the Fingerrock Wash Flora of Southwestern Nevada. Wolfe took a more conservative approach to the fossils, and suggested that all Oligocene to modern fossils that resemble the living Pinus monticola should be considered to belong to that species. As such P. latahensis, along with four other fossil species were considered by Wolfe as junior synonyms of P. monticola.

== Description ==
Needles on the P. latahensis type specimen are 1 mm (0.039 in) wide by approximately 9 cm (3.5 in) long, displaying two faces to each of the 5 individual needles. The needle sheath is deciduous, indicating a possible placement within the "white" pines (Pinus subgenus Strobus). The needles found in the Allenby Formation range 7 cm (2.8 in) or more in length growing from dwarf shoots ranging between 2–3 mm (0.079–0.118 in) in diameter by 5–6 mm (0.20–0.24 in) long. In the type description, Berry noted the fossil examined to be very similar to both the living western white pine and sugar pines.
