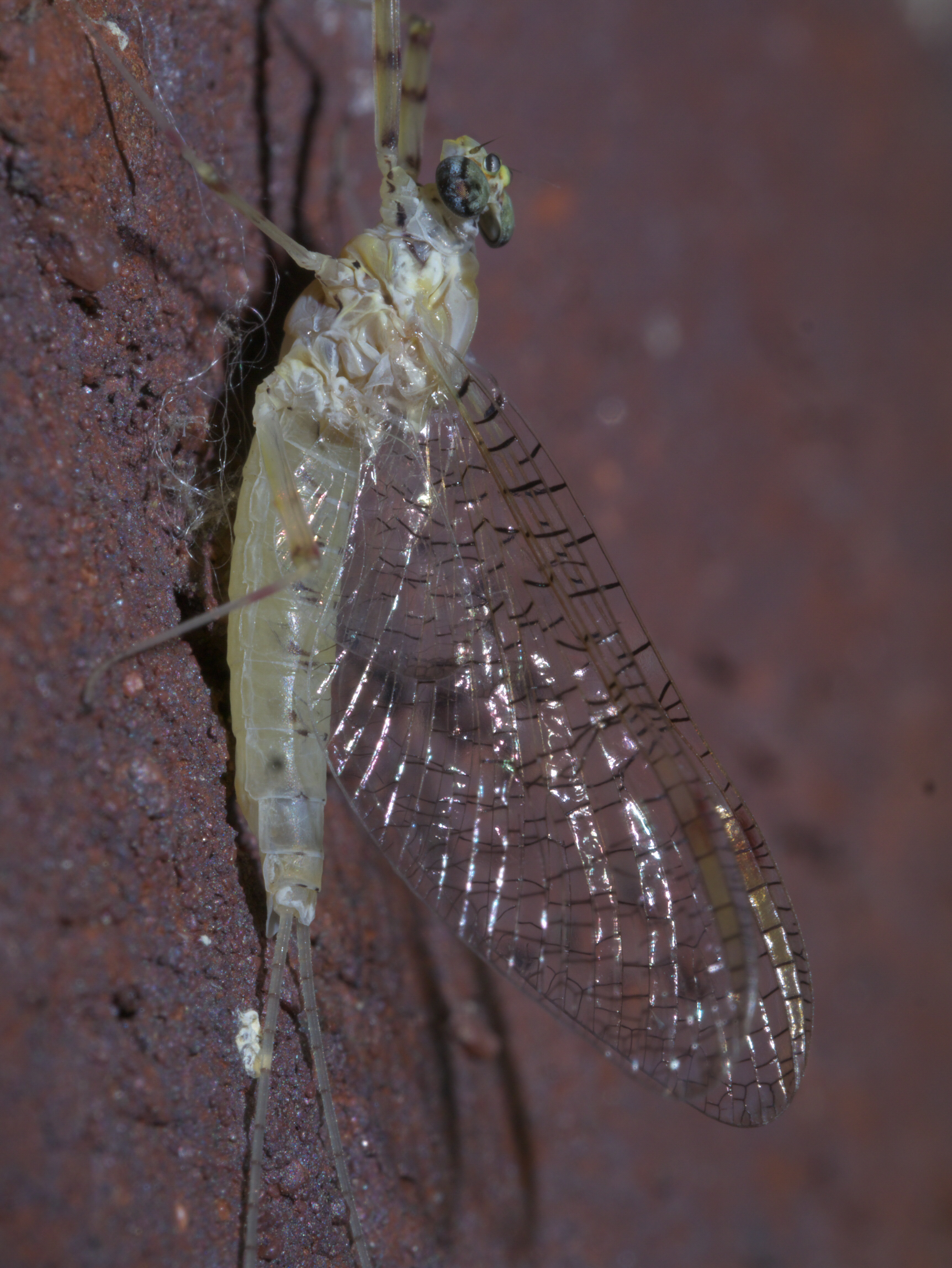
- Stenonema femoratum

Scientific classification
- Kingdom: Animalia
- Phylum: Arthropoda
- Clade: Pancrustacea
- Class: Insecta
- Order: Ephemeroptera
- Family: Heptageniidae
- Genus: Stenonema; Traver, 1933

= Stenonema =

Genus of mayflies

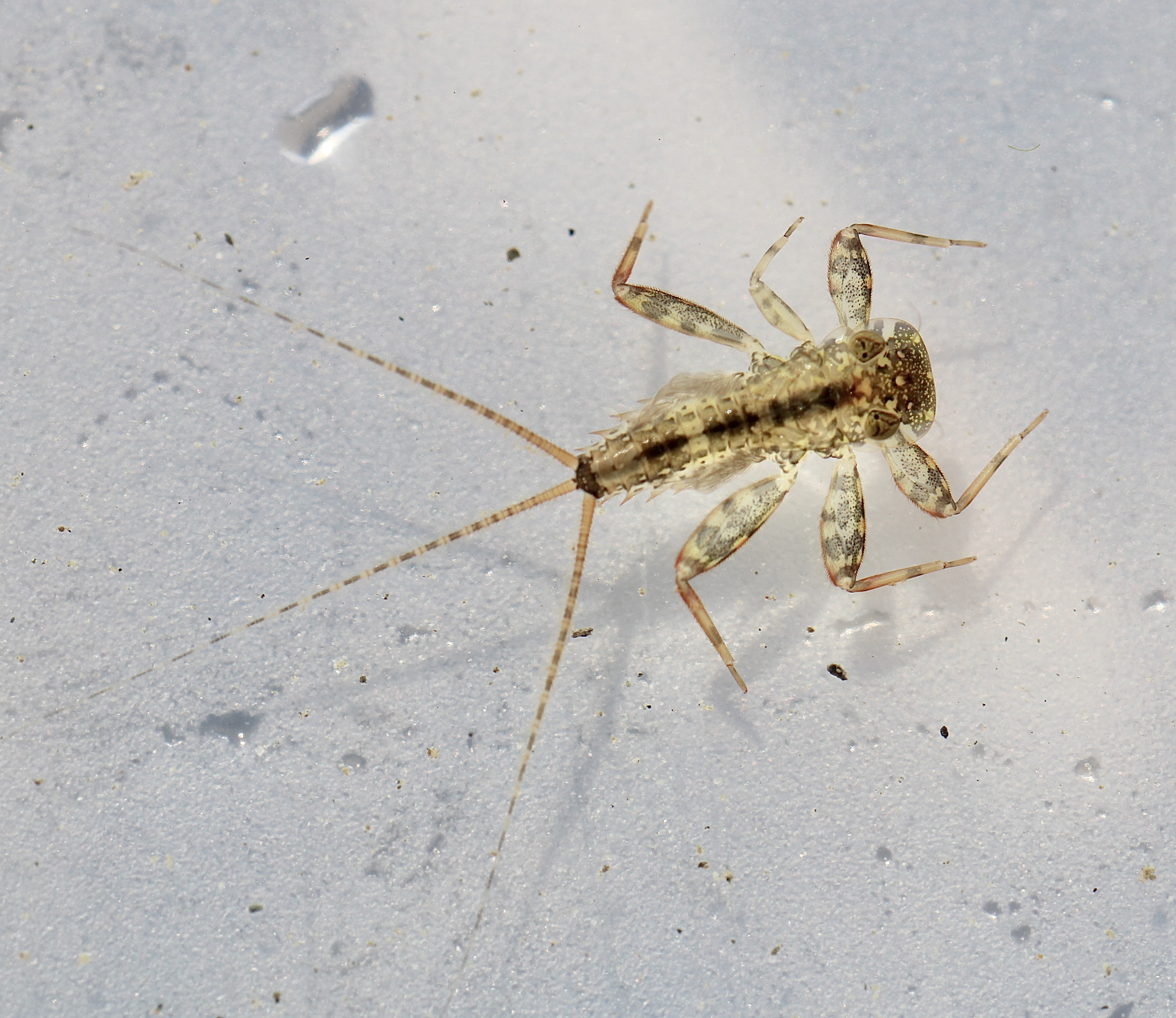
The nymphal stage of a Dark Cahill (Stenonema femoratum)

Stenonema is a genus of mayflies in the family Heptageniidae.
