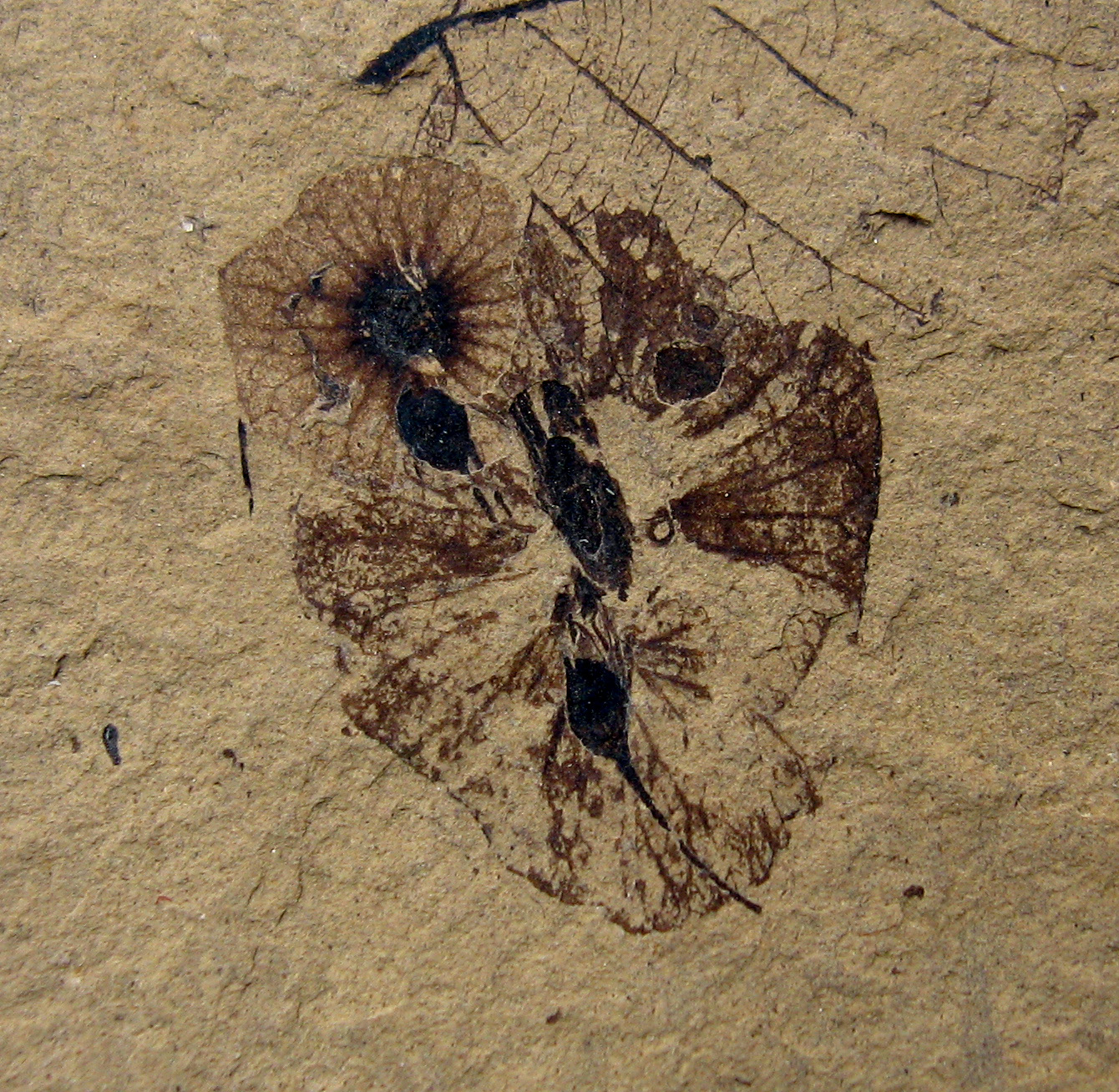
- Fossil Dillhoffia cachensis calyces

Scientific classification
- Kingdom: Plantae
- Clade: Tracheophytes
- Clade: Angiosperms
- Order: incertae sedis
- Genus: †Dillhoffia; Manchester & Pigg (2008)
- Species: †D. cachensis

Binomial name
- †Dillhoffia cachensis Manchester & Pigg (2008)

= Dillhoffia =

Dillhoffia Temporal range: 49.5 Ma

Fossil genus of plants (fossil)

Dillhoffia is an extinct monotypic genus of flowering plant with a single species, Dillhoffia cachensis known from Ypresian age Eocene fossils found in British Columbia, Canada, and Washington, US. The genus and species were described from fifteen specimens found in an unnamed formation belonging to the Kamloops group shales; and two specimens from the Klondike Mountain Formation. The unnamed formation outcrops at the McAbee Fossil Beds near Cache Creek, BC, which is designated the type locality while the two U.S. specimens were recovered from the Tom Thumb Tuff member of the Klondike Mountain Formation in Republic, Washington. Of the Okanagan highlands fossil sites, Dillhoffia is only known from two locations, and is absent or has not been identified from the others.

The holotype specimen, number TMP 83.39.175, is preserved in the Royal Tyrrell Museum of Palaeontology and the paratype specimens are in the Thompson Rivers University and University of Saskatchewan collections. The specimens were studied by paleobotanists Steven Manchester of the University of Florida and Kathleen Pigg of Arizona State University. Manchester and Pigg published the 2008 type description for D. cachensis in the journal Botany, Volume 86, number 9. They chose the generic name Dillhoffia to honor the brothers Richard M. Dillhoff and Thomas A. Dillhoff for their substantial contributions and promotion of Pacific Northwest North American Paleogene floras. The specific name is a reference to Cache Creek, British Columbia, the nearest town to the McAbee site.

Dillhoffia is known from infructescences only. The infructescences are pedunculate having a globose head which bore at least twelve flowers and has been preserved as fossils with several sessile fruits. The fruits are elongate to ellipsoidal in form, being 8–10 millimetres (0.31–0.39 in) by 4–5 millimetres (0.16–0.20 in), and indehiscent. The enlarged calyx present on the fruits is thought to have been used for wind transport, with the calyx being dish to funnel shaped and born approximately three-quarters of the way up the fruit from the base. Formed from a persistent perianth, the calyx may have been accrescent, as small-sized calyces are known. It is unknown what the petals and stamens looked like, as none have been found, possibly being shed during fruit formation. Dillhoffia was most likely a non-magnoliid angiosperm as indicated by its inferior ovary, but placement into a specific family is not possible with the fossils known.

A somewhat similar flower was described from the Warman clay pit in western Tennessee, but it is smaller and the shape of the veins is different.
