= Neoephemera =

Neoephemera Temporal range: Ypresian

Scientific classification
- Kingdom: Animalia
- Phylum: Arthropoda
- Clade: Pancrustacea
- Class: Insecta
- Order: Ephemeroptera
- Family: Neoephemeridae
- Genus: Neoephemera; McDunnough, 1925

Synonyms
- Oreianthus Traver, 1931

Genus of mayflies

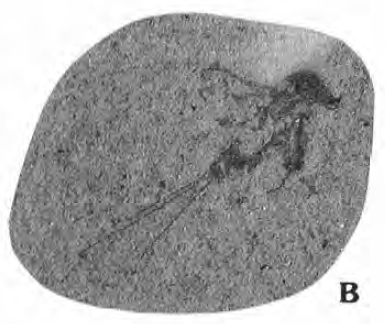

Neoephemera is a genus of large squaregill mayflies in the family Neoephemeridae first described by McDunnough (1925). and containing approximately six described species in Neoephemera.

== Species ==
These six species belong to the genus Neoephemera:

- Neoephemera bicolor McDunnough, 1925
- Neoephemera compressa Berner, 1956
- Neoephemera maxima (Joly, 1871)
- Neoephemera projecta Zhou & Zheng, 2000
- Neoephemera purpurea (Traver, 1931)
- Neoephemera youngi Berner, 1953

An extinct species, Neoephemera antiqua, has also been assigned to the genus. The species is known only from the type locality in the 51 to 49 million years ago Ypresian Klondike Mountain Formation of northeast Central Washington state.
