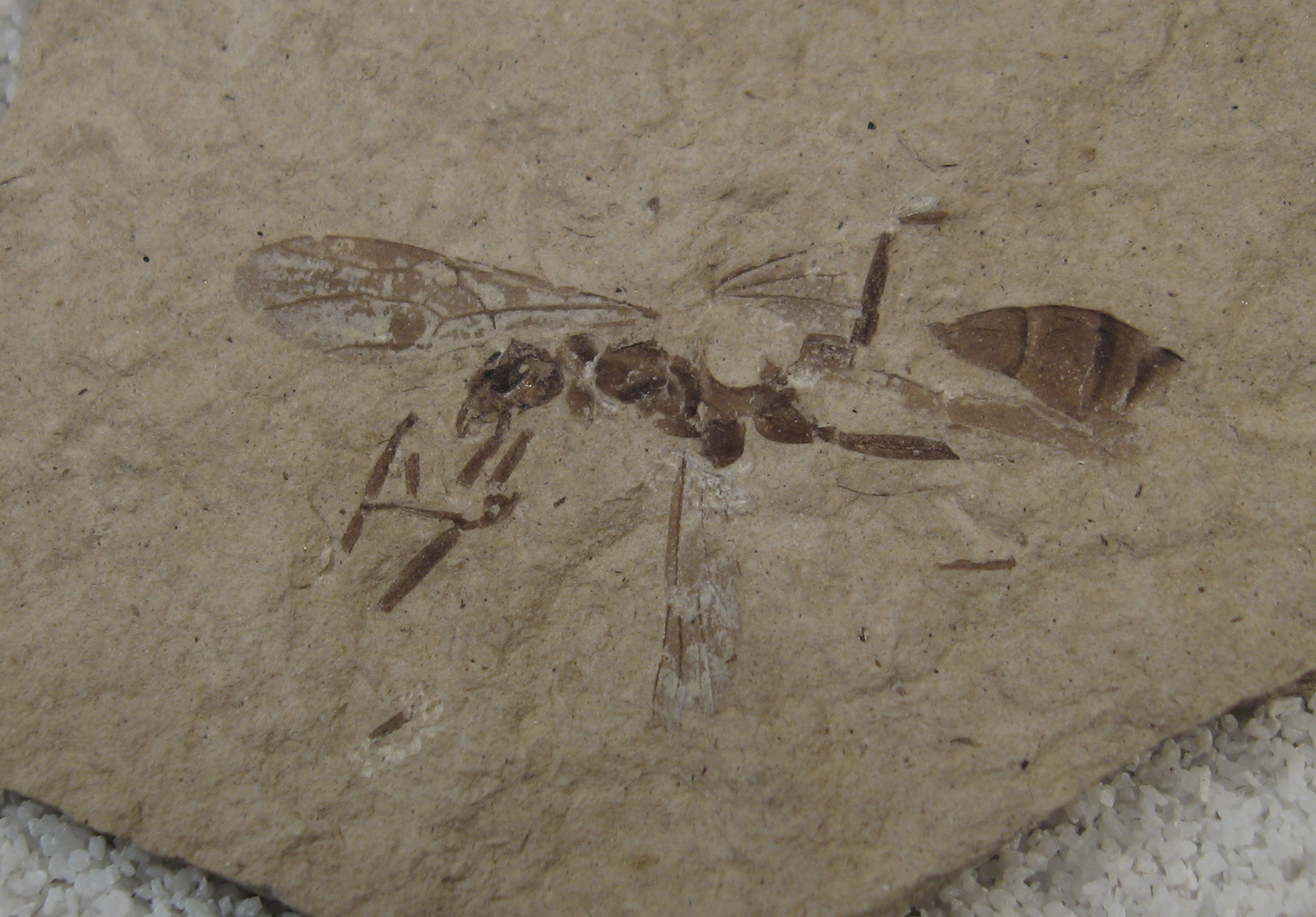
- Propalosoma gutierrezae holotype

Scientific classification
- Domain: Eukaryota
- Kingdom: Animalia
- Phylum: Arthropoda
- Class: Insecta
- Order: Hymenoptera
- Family: Formicidae
- Subfamily: Myrmeciinae
- Genus: †Propalosoma
- Species: †P. gutierrezae

Binomial name
- †Propalosoma gutierrezae Dlussky & Rasnitsyn, 1999

= Propalosoma =

Propalosoma Temporal range: Ypresian

Extinct genus of insects

Propalosoma is an extinct genus of ants in the family Formicidae, containing a single species Propalosoma gutierrezae, known from the Eocene aged Klondike Mountain Formation in Washington State. The genus was originally placed in the wasp family Rhopalosomatidae, but moved to the ant subfamily Myrmeciinae by Archibald et al in 2018.
