= Kishenehn Formation =

Paleogene stratigraphic unit in Montana

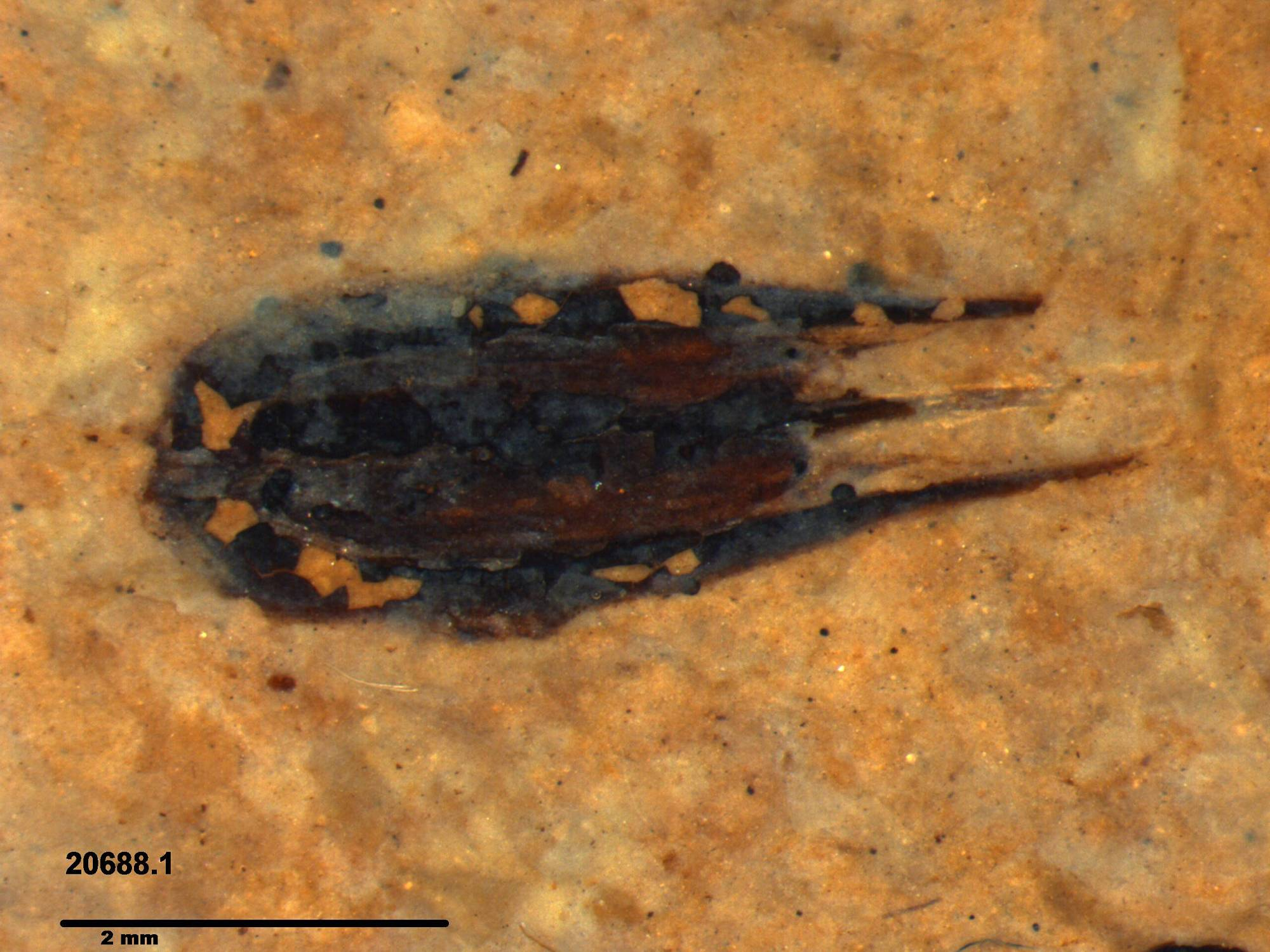
Fruiting body of Quadrasubulaflora kishenehnensis, a fossil Magnoliopsid

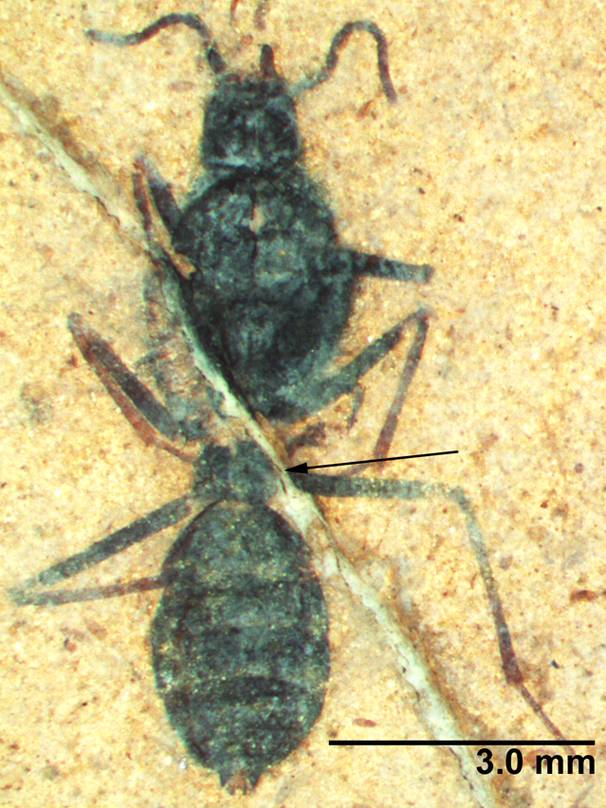
Eoformica latimedia

The Kishenehn Formation is a Paleogene stratigraphic unit in Montana. Fossil amiiforme and teleost fish have been found in outcrops of the formation's Coal Creek Member in Glacier National Park. Mosquitos have also been found in the Coal Creek Member, and have been found to be hematophagous. It is considered a Middle Eocene Lagerstätte.
