= Neoephemeridae =

- Potamanthellus sp. imago or subimago
- Neoephemera purpurea nymph

Scientific classification
- Kingdom: Animalia
- Phylum: Arthropoda
- Clade: Pancrustacea
- Class: Insecta
- Order: Ephemeroptera
- Suborder: Pannota
- Superfamily: Caenoidea
- Family: Neoephemeridae

Family of mayflies

Neoephemeridae is a family of large squaregill mayflies in the order Ephemeroptera. There are at least four genera and about 17 described species in Neoephemeridae.

== Genera ==
These four genera belong to the family Neoephemeridae:

- Leucorhoenanthus Lestage, 1930
- Neoephemera McDunnough, 1925 (large squaregill mayflies)
- Ochernova Bae & McCafferty, 1998
- Potamanthellus Lestage, 1930
