= J. H. Oldham =

Scottish missionary

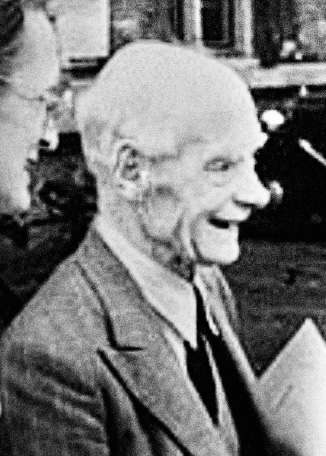
JH Oldham at WCC Assembly, Amsterdam 1948

Joseph Houldsworth Oldham CBE (1874–1969), known as J. H. or Joe, was a Scottish missionary in India, who became a significant figure in Christian ecumenism, though never ordained in the United Free Church as he had wished.

== Life ==
J.H. Oldham was the son of George Wingate Oldham (1807-1859) and Eliza 'Lillah' née Houldsworth (1845-?). He was born in India and brought up in Bombay until age 7, when his family returned to Scotland, living in Crieff and Edinburgh before matriculating as a student at Trinity College, Oxford. Joseph then went to Lahore in 1897, a missionary for the Scottish YMCA, there marrying in 1898 Mary Anna Gibson Fraser (1875-1965), daughter of Andrew Fraser and Agnes Whitehead née Archibald (1847-1877). He and Mary both suffered with typhoid, and returned to Scotland in 1901.

He became editor of the International Review of Missions in 1912, and travelled widely. At the end of World War I he was a secretary of the Emergency Committee of Cooperating Missions, chaired by John Mott. Article 438 of the Treaty of Versailles dealt with the property of German missions in territories ceded to the Allies by a mechanism of putting them in trust, and its inclusion is attributed to lobbying by Oldham.

He was secretary of the International Missionary Council from its setting up in London in 1921 to 1938, an organisation having its roots in the 1910 World Missionary Conference in which he was heavily involved, and which he helped found and make effective (with Mott, William Paton and Abbe Livingston Warnshuis). He promoted the 1926 founding of the International Institute of African Languages and Cultures by his efforts to gather funding. He then played a major role in the formation of the World Council of Churches.

From 1938 to 1947 he convened ‘The Moot’, a Christian think-tank concentrating on the problem of post-war reconstruction, at weekend residential meetings several times a year. The most regular members were John Baillie, Fred Clarke, T. S. Eliot, Eric Fenn, Herbert Arthur Hodges, Eleonora Iredale, Karl Mannheim, Walter Moberly, John Middleton Murry, Mary Oldham, Gilbert Shaw and Alec Vidler. Stefan Collini sums up the discussions as bearing "in one way or another, on the issue of cultural leadership in a modern society". Oldham also edited the Christian News-Letter (taken over by Kathleen Bliss), for the Council of the Churches on the Christian Faith and the Common Life. It published some papers derived from the Moot.

== Works ==
His book Christianity and the Race Problem (1924), against scientific racism, has been called "a sophisticated attempt to develop an alternative Christian analysis of racial relations by attacking the determinism of Stoddard and Grant, both of whom are cited, on scientific, economic, and ethical grounds". His proposed solutions, however, have been criticised as vague. At the time of publication it was reviewed positively by Christiaan Snouck Hurgronje.

Oldham was a principal leader in organizing and writing and editing material for the "Conference on Church, Community, and State", known as the Oxford Conference of 1937.

At the First Assembly of the World Council of Churches in 1948 Oldham contributed the important paper "A Responsible Society".

In later work he was influenced by Ludwig Feuerbach, Eberhard Grisebach and Martin Buber.

His book Life is Commitment (1959) is based upon a course of lectures given to the London School of Religion.

== Collections ==
The University of Leeds holds a collection of papers and letters concerning The Moot donated by Rev. O.S. Tomkins. The Institute of Education (IOE), University College London holds Sir Fred Clarke's set of The Moot's circulated discussion papers, 1939-1942, which were given to the IOE by Lewis Arnaud Reid when he retired.
