= Langeranthus =

- fruit

Scientific classification
- Kingdom: Plantae
- Clade: Tracheophytes
- Clade: Angiosperms
- Clade: Eudicots
- Order: Proteales
- Family: Platanaceae
- Genus: †Langeranthus; Huegele & Manchester
- Species: †L. dillhoffiorum

Binomial name
- †Langeranthus dillhoffiorum Huegele & Manchester

Extinct genus of flowering plant

holotype raceme with fruits

Langeranthus is an extinct genus of flowering plant in the family Platanaceae, consisting of the single species Langeranthus dillhoffiorum. The genus is known from fossil fruits found in the early Eocene deposits of northern Washington state, United States. L. dillhoffiorum are possibly the fruits belonging to the extinct platanaceous leaves Langeria magnifica.

== Distribution ==
The Langeranthus dillhoffiorum fossils were recovered from a single site in the Eocene Okanagan Highlands of Central British Columbia and northeast central Washington state. The described specimens are from the Klondike Mountain Formation in Northern Ferry County, Washington, being recovered from the "Boot Hill" site B4131 in Republic, Washington. Early estimates of the highlands sites ranged from Miocene to Eocene in age. The age of the Klondike Mountain Formation was debated for many years, with plant fossils suggesting a Late Oligocene or Early Miocene age, and the first descriptions of species from the area included them in the Middle Miocene Latah Formation. By the early 1960's the Klondike Mountain formation was thought to be late Oligocene in age. Potassium-argon radiometric dating of samples taken near the Tom Thumb mine in 1966 resulted in a tentative age of 55 million years old. Further refinement of sample dating had yielded an approximately Early Eocene, Ypresian age, being radiometrically dated as 49.4 million years old. A 2003 report using dating of detrital zircon crystals with the tuffs of the Klondike Mountain Formation had been dated to 49.42 ± 0.54 million years ago, the youngest of the Okanagan Highlands sites, A 2021 report revised the possible oldest age to around 51.2 ± 0.1 million years ago based on isotopic data from zircon crystals.

== History and classification ==
Working from a small group of specimens collected in the Republic, Washington area in the early 1980s, Jack A. Wolfe of the University of California and Wesley C. Wehr of the Burke Museum described a new morphogenus and species of angiosperm leaves. They published their 1987 type description for Langeria magnifica in a United States Geological Survey monograph on the North Eastern Washington dicot fossils. At that time they placed the genus into the witch-hazel family Hamamelidaceae wich was considered to be closely related to the plane-tree family Platanaceae. little discussion was provided for the placement into witch-hazels by Wolfe and Wehr.

Thirty-six years later Indah Huegele and Steven Manchester formally redescribed Langeria magnifica, moving it from its original placement in Hamamelidaceae to Platanaceae. Huegele and Manchester published their 2022 revisions and new type description of the taxa in the International Journal of Plant Sciences. The new reproductive fossils were identified as belonging to the leaves but kept as separate morphotaxa, while isolated stipules were included in Langeria. The authors decided to maintain the taxa in separate genera rather than including them in Langeria or within the living Platanus. Each organ has a mosaic of features that are found in various living species of Platanus from both Platanus subgenus Platanus and Platanus subgenus Castaneophyllum, making placement into the modern genus difficult. They additionally share features that are closer to extinct genera in the family such as Macginicarpa and Chemurnautia. Retaining the fruits in a separate morphogenus from the leaves was justified by Huegele and Manchester on the basis that the two organs have not yet been found in attachment, so some doubt remained as to true biological affinity.

The fruits were described from a small group of type specimens, the holotype infructescence, number SR 21-011-01, plus two paratype specimens and a third specimen not designated a paratype. At the time of description, the described series were preserved in the Stonerose Interpretive Center paleobotanical collections in Republic, Washington. The genus name Langeranthus was coined as a combination of anthus, Latin for "flower", and Langeria. This is a reference to the fruits likely affiliation with the Langeria tree. Wolfe and Wehr chose genus name Langeria as a matronym honoring the American philosopher of mind, Susanne K. Langer, who influenced the analysis and organization of scientific data.

Huegele and Manchester chose the specific epithet dillhoffiorum as a combined patronym honoring Thomas Dillhoff and Richard Dillhoff, for their long term support of paleontology students and projects along with founding and running the Evolving Earth Foundation.

It was noted by Huegele and Hongshan Wang (2023) that Langeranthus is one of only four fossil platanaceous fruit genera where bisexual flowers or flowering heads are known, and is the only Cenozoic occurrence. The other instances are all Cretaceous fossils found in North America and Asia, with Ambiplatanus from Vancouver Island, Canada, Distefananthus from Barton County, Kansas, and Kundurianthus from the Amur Region, Russia.

== Description ==
The flowering and fruiting heads of Langeranthus are globular and arranged on an elongated raceme. Each head is grown on a 6 mm (0.24 in) stalk from the central stem, and racemes bore male, female, and rare bisexual heads. Only one partial raceme was known at the time of description so true fruiting body length is unknown. The sole specimen preserves a series of nine fruiting heads arranged along the axis length with three fruiting heads, three male flower heads, and one bisexual head. The two other heads were incomplete enough that they could not be determined to sexual status.

The flowering heads are smaller than the fruiting ones, being between 7–10 mm (0.28–0.39 in) in diameter. They have anywhere between 51 and 61 male flowers encircled by a single whorl of 3 to 4 long overlapping tepals. The pollen produced by these florets is roughly prolate or football shaped with three equally spaced vertical openings around the central area. The external surface of the grains has a reticulated texturing.

The fruiting heads are also globular in outline, with an approximately 9 mm (0.35 in) core area and a whole fruit diameter of around 17 mm (0.67 in). Each of the heads has between 35 and 45 female florets, comprised of two distinct whorls surrounding the stamens and ovary. The outer whorl is a series of six triangular of short tepals with a total length about 10% the fruit height. The inner whorl may be either staminodes or tepals that are interpreted as being terete, likely being circular in cross section. the inner whorl is markedly longer then the outer, with total lengths reaching 90% of the fruits. The pollenated florets each typically have four maturing fruits, though a few florets were seen with three fruits. Individual fruits are dry achenes that have a tetragonal wedge outline and straight sides for about 90% of the fruit height before tapering into a style point. As with other extinct platanaceous fruit taxa, Langeranthus achenes did not have dispersal hairs as are found on modern fruits of the family.

== Paleoenvironment ==
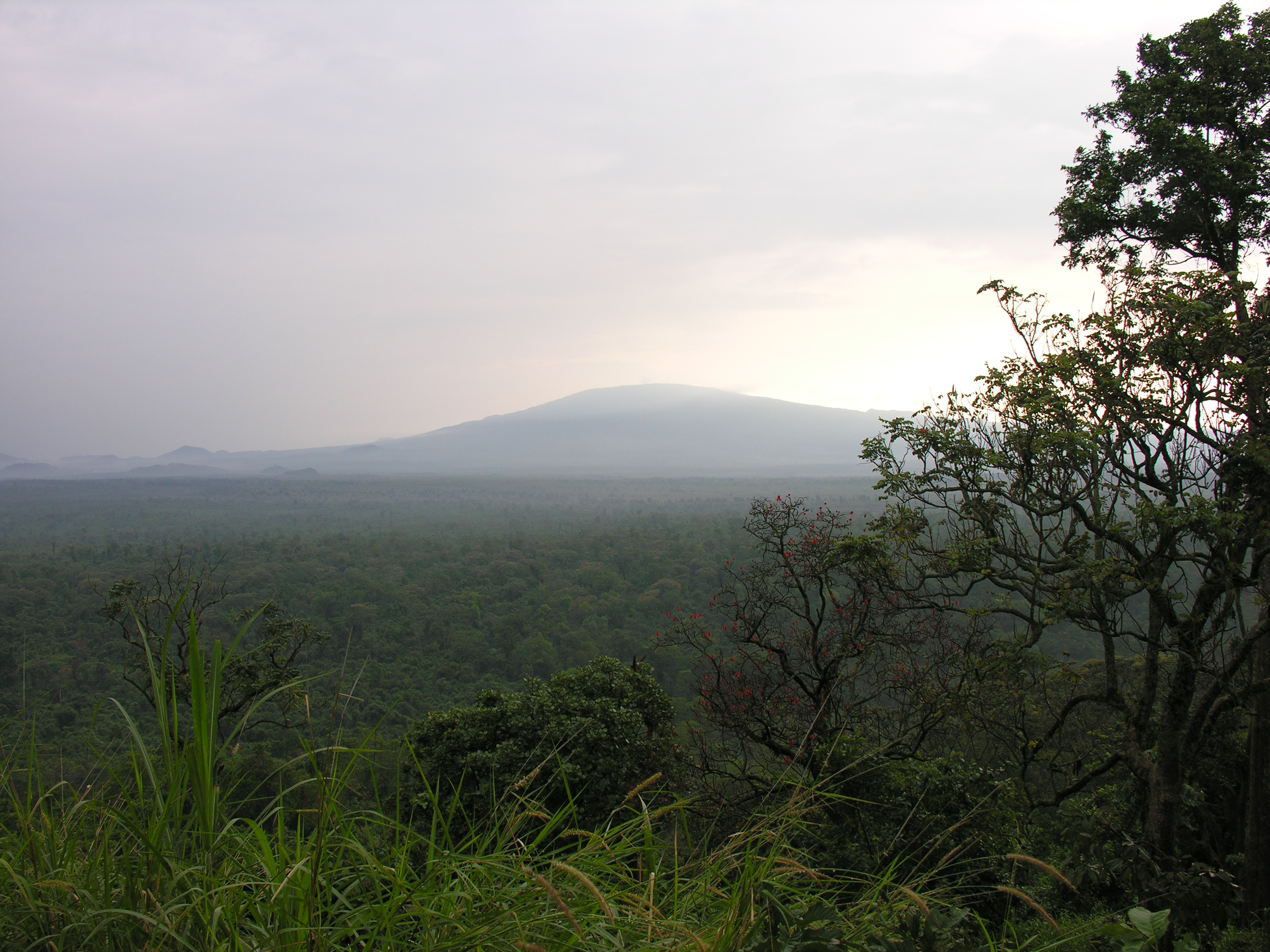
Virunga National Park, Albertine Rift, Africa

The Langeria magnifica-Langeranthus dillhoffiorum tree is one of two Platanaceae whole-plant concepts recognized in from the Klondike Mountain Formation and the Republic Flora. Wolfe and Wehr also documented Macginitiea gracilis leaves from the flora in 1987, while Manchester in 1986 made passing reference to Macginicarpa species fruits and Platananthus flowering heads were reported by Kathleen Pigg and Wesley Wehr in 2002.

The Republic site is part of a larger fossil site system collectively known as the Eocene Okanagan Highlands. The highlands, including the Early Eocene formations between Driftwood Canyon at the north and Republic at the south, have been described as one of the "Great Canadian Lagerstätten" based on the diversity, quality and unique nature of the paleofloral and paleofaunal biotas that are preserved. The highlands temperate biome preserved across a large transect of lakes recorded many of the earliest appearances of modern genera, while also documenting the last stands of ancient lines. The warm temperate highland floras in association with downfaulted lacustrine basins and active volcanism are noted to have no exact modern equivalents. This is due to the more seasonally equitable conditions of the Early Eocene, resulting in much lower seasonal temperature shifts. However, the highlands have been compared to the upland ecological islands of the Virunga Mountains within the African rift valleys Albertine Rift.

The Klondike Mountain Formation represents pinpoint spot a long upland lake system series that was surrounded by a warm temperate ecosystem with nearby volcanism dating from during and just after the early Eocene climatic optimum. The Okanagan Highlands likely had a mesic upper microthermal to lower mesothermal climate, in which winter temperatures rarely dropped low enough for snow, and which were seasonably equitable. The paleoforest surrounding the lakes have been described as precursors to the modern temperate broadleaf and mixed forests of Eastern North America and Eastern Asia. Based on the fossil biotas the lakes were higher and cooler then the coeval coastal forests preserved in the Puget Group and Chuckanut Formation of Western Washington, which are described as lowland tropical forest ecosystems. Estimates of the paleoelevation range between 0.7 and 1.2 km (0.43 and 0.75 mi) higher than the coastal forests. This is consistent with the paleoelevation estimates for the lake systems, which range between 1.1 and 2.9 km (1,100 and 2,900 m), which is similar to the modern elevation 0.8 km (0.50 mi), but higher.

Estimates of the mean annual temperature have been derived from climate leaf analysis multivariate program (CLAMP) analysis and leaf margin analysis (LMA) of the Republic paleoflora. The CLAMP results after multiple linear regressions gave a mean annual temperature of approximately 8.0 °C (46.4 °F), with the LMA giving 9.2 ± 2.0 °C (48.6 ± 3.6 °F). A bioclimatic-based estimate based on modern relatives of the taxa found at Republic suggested mean annual temperatures around 13.5 ± 2.2 °C (56.3 ± 4.0 °F). This is lower than the mean annual temperature estimates given for the coastal Puget Group, which is estimated to have been between 15 and 18.6 °C (59.0 and 65.5 °F). The bioclimatic analysis for Republic suggests a mean annual precipitation amount of 115 ± 39 cm (45 ± 15 in).
