= Gilbert Shaw =

British priest (1886–1967)

Gilbert Shuldham Shaw (10 July 1886 in Dublin – 18 August 1967 in Convent of the Incarnation, Fairacres, Oxford) was an Anglo-Irish Church of England priest, from 1940 vicar of St Anne's Soho. His maternal grandfather was Sir Philip Crampton Smyly, honorary physician to Queen Victoria, and he was baptised by his mother's uncle, William Conyngham Plunket, archbishop of Dublin. He was closely associated with the Community of the Sisters of the Love of God from 1962 until his death. He was the author of numerous works on spirituality and books of prayers.

He was one of the regular members of ‘The Moot’, a Christian think-tank convened by J H Oldham, concentrating on the problem of post-war reconstruction, at weekend residential meetings several times a year. The most regular members were John Baillie, Fred Clarke, T. S. Eliot, Eric Fenn, Herbert Arthur Hodges, Eleonora Iredale, Karl Mannheim, Walter Moberly, John Middleton Murry, Mary Oldham and Alec Vidler. Stefan Collini sums up the discussions as bearing "in one way or another, on the issue of cultural leadership in a modern society".

With Patrick McLaughlin, he is thought to be part of the inspiration for the character of Father Hugh Chantry-Pigg in Rose Macaulay's The Towers of Trebizond.

== Publications by Gilbert Shaw ==
Articles in journals (by date):

- ‘The Importance of the Canon on Exorcism’, St Raphael Quarterly [from 1965: Chrism], 4/5 (1928), 2.
- ‘Exorcism and the Ministry of Healing’, St Raphael Quarterly, 4/6 (1928), 6.
- ‘Exorcism: Its Application’, St Raphael Quarterly, 4/7 (1928), 12.
- ‘Exorcism: Its Occasions’, St Raphael Quarterly, 4/8 (1928), 21.
- ‘The New Evangelism’, London Diocesan Chronicle, (August 1935).
- ‘Peace Through Suffering’ Platform, (Feb 1937).
- ‘First Aid’, Christendom: A Journal of Christian Sociology, (1937)
- ‘Prayer and Theology’, Theology, 38/228 (Jun 1, 1939), 418–28.
- ‘Watchman what of the Night’, Waterloo Bridge (1939).
- ‘The Great Church’, Theology, 44/259 (Jan 1, 1942), 31–43.
- ‘The Church’s Unity and Total Claim’, in On Earth Peace: A Symposium by Communicants of the Church of England, ed. Percy Hartill (James Clarke, 1944).
- ‘The Church and the Coming of the Kingdom’, Fairacres Chronicle, 4/2 (June 1971), 23–6.
- ‘Response to the Spirit: Father Gilbert with the nuns at Fairacres, December 1962’, Fairacres Chronicle, 19/2 (Summer 1986), 11–21.
- ‘A New Beginning: our Lady's Place in the Scheme of Redemption’, Fairacres Chronicle, 19/3 (Winter 1986), 16–23.
- ‘Fr Gilbert’s Last Homily’ Fairacres Chronicle, 40/1 (Summer 2007) [reproduced several times in later issues].
- ‘Citadels and Lighthouses’, Fairacres Chronicle, 49/1 (Summer 2016), 19–24.

Books and pamphlets (by title):

- A Few Suggestions for Consideration on The Lord's Prayer as the Pattern of All Prayer from the Standpoint of Reparation, One Tradition Series 17 (CSWG Press, 1992) 8pp.
- A Pilgrim's Book of Prayers (Mowbray, 1945, 1960) 156pp.; (Oxford: SLG Press, 1972, 1979) iv, 132pp.; New edition (Oxford: SLG Press, 1992), xxvi, 132pp.
- A Prophetic View of Our Times: A Century of Excerpts from the Writings of Father Gilbert Shaw 1886-1967 Priest and Prophet for Our Times, One Tradition Series 14 (CSWG Press, 1987), 25pp.
- Angels and Demons In Human Life (Faith Press for the Fellowship of St Alban and St Sergius, 1955, repr. CSWG Press, One Tradition Series 8, 1982).
- Christian Prayer: A Way of Progress (SLG Press, 1970, 1973, 1977), vii, 30pp.
- Creation and Re-Creation: An Approach To Prayer (SLG Press, 1971, 1973, 1977, 1983), 27pp.
- Death: The Gateway To Life (SLG Press, 1971, 1975, 2024).
- For Quiet Times (Association for Promoting Retreats, 1920).
- For Times of Recreation. Notes for Use During Private and Corporate Silent Times (Association for Promoting Retreats, 1931):
- – No. 1: The Love of God: For use during private and corporate silent times.
- – No. 2: Meditations on the Way of the Cross, Specially adapted for use in Holy Week (Stations of the Cross)
- – No. 3: The Way to Calvary
- – No. 4: In the Shadow of the Cross: A Meditation on the Seven Words of Calvary
- Glastonbury Series of Short Prayers (Faith Press, n.d.):
- – No. 1 The Increase of Prayer
- – No. 2 Joy in God
- – No. 3 The Unity of Trinity
- – No. 4 The Fellowship of Prayer
- –– Published under a single cover as The Glastonbury Series of Short Prayers (Faith Press, 1959).
- Introductory Notes To the Study of Devotional Literature (Association for Promoting Retreats/Mowbray, 1928).
- Joy in God (Faith Press, 1959).
- Meditations for Holy Week: An Open Retreat (Association for Promoting Retreats, 1930).
- Our Lady at Mount Calvary (n.p. 1931)
- Prayer, Fairacres Leaflet no. 8 (SLG Press, [1971])
- Prayer and the Life of Reconciliation, Fairacres Leaflet 1 (SLG Press, 1969, 2001), 5pp.
- Prayer: Extracts from the Teaching of Father Gilbert Shaw (SLG Press, 1971, 1973).
- Prayers and Meditations for the Lovers of Jesus. Founded on the Early English Treatise ‘A Talkynge of the Love of God’ (Mowbray, 1927), 16pp.
- Preface by Gilbert Shaw in: Harry Lovett Hubbard, As the Incense: Chapters On Prayer and the Spiritual Life (Mowbray, 1931), xi, 83pp.
- Rhythmic Prayers (SLG Press, 1968, 2nd edn 1973, 1976, 1980), 30pp.
- Seeds of Love: Being the Glastonbury Series of Short Prayers, ed. and rev. Sister Edna Monica (SLG Press, Revised edn 1978), ii, 37pp.
- Sitio: I Thirst: The Prayer of Intercession (SLG Press, 2nd edn 1970, 1976), 83pp.
- Some Notes On Terminology, to Serve as an Introduction to the Study of Spiritual Writings. Prepared for the Use of a School of Prayer (Mowbray, 1927), 24pp.
- The Burgh Booklet [Prayers and Meditations written at St Paul’s Missionary College, Burgh, Lincs. The pamphlets focused on Anglo-Catholic themes, mission theology, and training.] (Mowbray, 1924–1927).
- – No. 1: A Pilgrim’s Chapbook I: Worship, Thanksgiving, Intercession
- – No. 2: To Calvary: A Meditation
- – No. 3: Prayers for the Quiet Hour I
- – No. 4: Prayers for the Quiet Hour II
- – No. 5: A Pilgrim’s Chapbook II The Pattern of the Master
- – No. 6: Short Prayers from the Psalter
- –– Published under a single binding usually called A Pilgrim’s Chapbook (Mowbray, 1965).
- The Christian Hope: A Rhythmic Meditation, Fairacres Leaflet 3 (SLG Press, c. 1969)
- The Christian Solitary (SLG Press, 1971, 1975, rev. edn 1979, 1984, 2003, 2012), iii, 15pp.
- The Face of Love: A Devotion On the Fourteen Stations of the Cross (Mowbray, 1959), 247pp.; Rev. edn, The Face of *Love: Meditations on the Way of the Cross (SLG Press, 1977), xxi, 125pp.
- The Fellowship of Prayer (Faith Press, 1959).
- The Increase of Prayer (Faith Press, 1959; rev. CSWG Press, 2000); German trans. Bernhard R. Kraus, Waltraud Leidig-Walther, Wachsen im Gebet: Hilfen zur Kontemplation anhand der Sendschreiben (Johannes-Verlag; KSM, Katholische Schriften-Mission, Leutesdorf, Leutesdorf, 2002).
- The Priesthood: An Address to a Group of Priests, One Tradition Series 18 (CSWG Press, 1992), 12pp.
- The Spiritual Life: The True Foundation of the Social Order (Industrial Christian Fellowship, Westminster, 1935).
- The Unity of Trinity (Faith Press, 1959).
- with W F Adams, Triumphant In Suffering: A Study in Reparation (Mowbray, 1951), 64pp., [1] leaf of plates.
- Wayfaring: Poems (SLG Press, 1968).
- Words of Wisdom from Father Gilbert Shaw, compiled by Freda Collins (J R Books, 1986), 108pp.*
