= Homo aestheticus =

Homo aestheticus be:

- a term for man's higher nature in Goethe's Wilhelm Meisters Lehrjahre
- a reference to art as a human universal
- Homo Aestheticus, the title of a 1992 book

== See also ==
- Names for the human species
- Homo oeconomicus (antonym)
- Cultural universal
