= Donald Allchin =

British Anglican priest and theologian (1930-2010)

The Reverend Canon Donald Allchin
- Born: Arthur Macdonald Allchin; 20 April 1930; London, England
- Died: 23 December 2010 (aged 80); Oxford, Oxfordshire, England
- Education: Westminster School <r />Christ Church, Oxford; Cuddesdon College
- Occupations: Anglican priest, theologian

Arthur Macdonald "Donald" Allchin (20 April 1930 – 23 December 2010), published as A. M. Allchin, was a British Anglican priest and theologian. He was librarian of Pusey House, Oxford, from 1960 to 1969, a residentiary canon of Canterbury Cathedral from 1973 to 1987, and programme director of the St Theosevia Centre for Christian Spirituality in Oxford from 1987 to 1996.

== Early life and education ==
Allchin was born on 20 April 1930 in London, England, the third and youngest son of Frank Macdonald Allchin (1891–1977) and his wife Louise Maude Allchin, née Wright (1889–1978). One of his siblings was the archaeologist Raymond Allchin. He was educated at Westminster School, then an all-boys public school in London. He then studied modern history at Christ Church, Oxford, and he graduated with a Bachelor of Arts (BA) degree in 1951: as per tradition, his BA degree was promoted to a Master of Arts (MA Oxon) in 1955. In 1954, he matriculated into Cuddesdon College, an Anglo-Catholic theological college near Oxford, to train for holy orders. During this time, he also studied theology at Christ Church, Oxford, completing a Bachelor of Letters (BLitt) degree in 1956.

Due to his reputation as a theologian and for his involvement in Anglican-Orthodox relations, Allchin was awarded a number of honorary Doctor of Divinity (DD) degrees; by the Bucharest Theological Institute in 1977, Nashotah House in 1985, Aarhus University in 1992 and the University of Wales in 1993. He was awarded a Lambeth DD in 2006.

== Ordained ministry ==
Allchin was ordained in the Church of England as a deacon in 1956 and as a priest in 1957. From 1956 to 1960, he served his curacy at St Mary Abbots, Kensington in the Diocese of London. In 1960, he joined Pusey House, Oxford as librarian; Pusey House is a "centre of Anglo-Catholic worship and spirituality" that is associated with the University of Oxford. In 1967 or 1968, he additionally became Warden of the Community of the Sisters of the Love of God (SLG), an Anglican contemplative community of women based in Oxford; he only relinquished his wardenship in 1994. He was a visiting lecturer at the General Theological Seminary, an Episcopal seminary in New York, in 1967 and in 1968.

Allchin left Pusey House in 1969 to become an independent theologian. During this time, he also acted as an adviser to Michael Ramsey, the then Archbishop of Canturbury, on Anglican relations with the Eastern Orthodox Church. Then, from 1973 to 1987, he was a residentiary canon of Canterbury Cathedral. From 1973, he took part in the Anglican-Orthodox Joint Doctrinal Discussions, the first of which was held in Oxford. He held a number of visiting academic appointments during this time: at Catholic University of Lyon in 1980, at the Trinity Institute of Trinity Church, New York City in 1983, and at Nashotah House, Wisconsin in 1984.

In 1987, Allchin left Canterbury Cathedral to become programme director of the St Theosevia Centre for Christian Spirituality in Oxford. In 1988, he was appointed an "Honorary Provincial Canon" of Canterbury Cathedral. From 1992 until his death, he was an honorary professor at the University of Wales, Bangor. He retired from the St Theosevia Centre in 1994.

In retirement, Allchin held a licence to officiate in the Diocese of Canterbury from 1994 to 1997, and permission to officiate in the Diocese of Bangor from 1997 to 2010.

=== Views ===
Allchin was a dedicated ecumenist. He had been a member of the Fellowship of Saint Alban and Saint Sergius since he first attended university; this is a Christian society founded to foster relations between the Anglican and Orthodox traditions. He worked closely with another member of that fellowship, H. A. Hodges, in the study of Welsh literature, in particular the work of Ann Griffiths.

== Personal life ==
On 23 December 2010, Allchin died in Oxford, Oxfordshire, England; he was aged 80. A Requiem Mass was held for him on 12 January 2011 at St Mary Magdalen's Church, Oxford. The sermon was given by Rowan Williams, the then Archbishop of Canterbury.

Allchin never married, but he made friends from around the world. Allchin would often remark his mentor Michael Ramsey's "genius for friendship."

== Selected works ==
- Allchin, A. M. (1958). The Silent Rebellion: Anglican Religious Communities, 1845–1900. London: SCM Press.
- Allchin, A. M. (1963). Spirit and the Word. London: Faith Press. ISBN 978-0716400103.
- Coulson, John; Allchin, A. M., eds. (1967). The Rediscovery of Newman: an Oxford symposium. London: Sheed & Ward. ISBN 978-0722005101.
- Allchin, A. M. (1976). Ann Griffiths. Cardiff: University of Wales Press.
- Allchin, A. M. (1978). The World Is a Wedding: Explorations in Christian Spirituality. Oxford: Oxford University Press. ISBN 978-0195200799.
- Allchin, A. M. (1979). The Kingdom of Love and Knowledge: the encounter between Orthodoxy and the West]. London: Darton, Longman and Todd. ISBN 978-0232514377.
- Allchin, A. M. (1981). The Dynamic of Tradition. London: Darton Longman & Todd. ISBN 978-0232515169.
- Allchin, A. M. (1982). A Taste of Liberty. Oxford: SLG. ISBN 978-0728300941.
- Allchin, A. M. (1984) [1st pub. Darton, Longman & Todd :1984]. The Joy of All Creation: an Anglican meditation on the place of Mary (1st ed.). Cambridge, MA: Cowley Publications. ISBN 978-0936384245.
- Allchin, A .M.; de Waal, Esther, eds. (1986). Threshold of Light: prayers and praises from the Celtic tradition. London: Darton, Longman and Todd. ISBN 978-0232516784.
- Allchin, A. M. (1988). Participation in God: a forgotten strand in Anglican tradition. Wilton, CT: Morehouse-Barlow. ISBN 978-0819214089.
- Allchin, A. M., ed. (1989). The Heart of Compassion. London: Darton, Longman and Todd. ISBN 978-0232518061.
- Allchin, A. M., ed. (1989). Landscapes of Glory: Daily Readings with Thomas Traherne. London: Darton, Longman and Todd. ISBN 978-0232518603.
- Allchin, A. M. (1991). Praise above all: discovering the Welsh tradition. Cardiff: University of Wales Press. ISBN 978-0708310915.
- Allchin, A. M. (1993). The joy of all creation: an Anglican meditation on the place of Mary (2nd ed.). London: New City. ISBN 978-0904287486.
- Allchin, A. M.; Jasper, D., eds. (1994). Heritage and prophecy: Grundtvig and the English-speaking world. Norwich: Canterbury. ISBN 978-1853110856.
- Allchin, A. M. (1997). God's presence makes the world: the Celtic vision through the centuries in Wales. London: Darton, Longman & Todd. ISBN 978-0232522068.
- Allchin, A. M. (1997). N.F.S. Grundtvig: an introduction to his life and work. Aarhus: Aarhus University Press. ISBN 978-8772886565.
- Allchin, A. M. (1998). Resurrection's children: exploring the way towards God. Norwich: Canterbury Press. ISBN 978-1853112362.
- Allchin, A. M.; Morgan, D. Densil (2000). Sensuous glory: the poetic vision of D. Gwenallt Jones. Norwich: Canterbury Press. ISBN 978-1853113499.
- Allchin, A. M.; Bradley, S. A. J., eds. (2000). Grundtvig in international perspective: studies in the creativity of interaction. Aarhus: Aarhus University Press. ISBN 978-8772888354.
- Allchin, A. M. (2003). Friendship in God: the encounter of Evelyn Underhill and Sorella Maria of Campello. Oxford: SLG. ISBN 978-0728301610.
- Allchin, A. M. (2005). The Gift of Theology: The Trinitarian Vision of Ann Griffiths and Elizabeth of Dijon. Rome: Canterbury Press. ISBN 978-0728301641.
