= Margaret Sampson =

English Anglican nun (1906–1988)

Personal life
- Born: 5 June 1906 Oxford, England
- Died: 14 August 1988 (aged 82) Oxford, England
- Occupation: Anglican nun

Religious life
- Religion: Anglican
- Order: Community of the Sisters of the Love of God

Margaret Sampson (5 June 1906 – 14 August 1988) was an English Anglican nun who was Mother Superior of the Community of the Sisters of the Love of God from 1954 to 1973. She was professed as Sister Margaret Clare in 1932 when she was active in the sisterhood of Society of Saint Margaret in East Grinstead before becoming received as Sister Mary Clare of the Precious Blood eleven years later. Sampson set up the SLG Press that published literature about Christian spirituality to a wider audience in response to the growing eagerness of Christians and non-Christians to learn about Christian mystical tradition.

== Early life ==
On 5 June 1906, Sampson was born at 11 Rawlinson Road, Oxford. She was the daughter of the fellow and later principal of Brasenose College, Oxford, Charles Henry Sampson, and his wife, Margaret Caroline Sophie Bolckow, a member of the Blockow family that laid Middlesbrough's modern foundations with their ironstone works. On 2 July 1906, Sampson was baptised at St Margaret's Church, Oxford and was confirmed on 9 December 1919. She had three elder siblings. After being educated in Felixstowe, she was one of the first home students to attend St Anne's College, Oxford, reading philosophy, politics and economics.

== Career ==
Following her graduating, Sampson immediately went into the active Anglican sisterhood of Society of Saint Margaret in East Grinstead, joining them sometime between 1929 and 1930. On 14 September 1932, she was professed as Sister Margaret Clare. Sampson was an educator at the school and resided at the society's school in Cardiff when The Blitz was occurring. In 1941, she joined the Community of the Sisters of the Love of God, that was based in Oxford after she earned a successful transfer. Sampson was received as Sister Mary Clare of the Precious Blood on 6 August 1943.

She was elected as Mother Superior of the Community of the Sisters of the Love of God on 3 April 1954. Supported by the Community of St John the Evangelist and working closely with their warden Gilbert Shaw, Sampson began working for life for the Community of the Sisters of the Love of God. Her work was heavily influenced by Shaw; Kenneth Leech of The Independent wrote that the two assisted in the forming of an "understanding and practice of contemplative living in the midst of a world of action." Under Sampson's leadership, she oversaw the opening of the new foundation in Bede House close to Staplehurst, Kent in 1967. Sampson established the SLG Press that published literature concerned with Christian spirituality such as its Fairacres Pamphlets to a wider audience. This was done in response to the growing eagerness of Christians and non-Christians to learn about Christian mystical tradition.

Sampson encouraged and took part in ecumenical dialogue, particularly with the Roman Catholic and Orthodox churches, and helped other religious communities seek ways to achieve reconstruction. Church leaders consulted her and she partook in important meetings and conferences. In 1973, Sampson returned as Mother Superior. Eight years later, she published the book Encountering the Depths about her spiritual teachings. Sampson's written records have remained largely unpublished. In it, she stated four needs for contemporary churches: living with eternity, the gift of knowing and interpreting God's actions "in the present crisis of the world", committing to the healing and wholeness of humans and their communities, and recognising the role of the praying community "as the spearhead of the conflict with the powers of darkness."

== Death ==
On 14 August 1988, she died at the Convent of the Incarnation in Fairacres, Oxford. Sampson was buried at Oxford's Rose Hill cemetery four days later.
