= Kathleen Bliss =

English theologian (1908–1989)

- Bliss in 1962
- Born: Kathleen Mary Amelia Moore; 5 July 1908; Fulham, London, England
- Died: 13 September 1989 (aged 81); Midhurst, Sussex, England
- Occupations: Theologian; missionary
- Organisation: World Council of Churches
- Movement: Ecumenism
- Spouse: Rupert Bliss (m. 1932)
- Children: 3

Academic background
- Education: Girton College, Cambridge

Academic work
- Institutions: University of Sussex
- Main interests: Religious studies

Kathleen Mary Amelia Bliss (née Moore; 5 July 1908 – 13 September 1989) was an English theologian, missionary and official of the World Council of Churches (WCC).

== Early life ==
Bliss was born in Fulham. She attended Girton College, Cambridge, graduating in theology (First Class, 1931) and history (Second Class, 1929). While at university, she participated in the Student Volunteer Movement.

Bliss left for an extended missionary trip to Tamil Nadu in 1932 under the auspices of the London Missionary Society. She went with her husband Rupert, whom she married that year, and they remained in India until 1939.

== Literary career ==
Upon her return to England, Bliss began working at the Christian News Letter, then managed by J. H. Oldham. She became assistant editor in 1942 and editor in 1945, in which capacity she served until the publication folded in 1949. From 1950 to 1955, she worked at the BBC as a producer.

== World Council of Churches ==
In the 1940s and 1950s, Bliss served in various capacities in the WCC, an ecumenical organisation founded in 1948. She became a member of WCC's executive committee in 1954. Her work with WCC focused particularly on the role of women in the church. She published a monograph on the subject in 1952.

== Academic career ==
From 1967/8 (Note: Accounts differ slightly as to the year Bliss was appointed as a lecturer at the university.) to 1972, Bliss was a senior lecturer in religious studies at the University of Sussex.

== Religious views ==
Originally a Congregationalist, Bliss had become a member of the Church of England by 1948.

== Works ==
In addition to the published works listed below, Bliss prepared, but never finished, a book-length biography of J. H. Oldham.

- Bliss, Kathleen (1952). The Service and Status of Women in the Churches. London: SCM Press. OCLC 7432626.
- — (1963). We the People: A Book about Laity. London: SCM Press. OCLC 1015592371.
- — (1970) [1962]. "The Role of Religion in the Pursuit of Freedom". In Jeleński, Konstanty A. (ed.). History and Hope: Tradition, Ideology, and Change in Modern Society. Freeport, New York: Books for Libraries Press. pp. 142–144. ISBN 9780836917949. OCLC 1149158973.
- — (1972). The Future of Religion. London: Penguin Books. OCLC 1014547705.
- — (1984). "The Legacy of J. H. Oldham". International Bulletin of Missionary Research. 8 (1): 18–24. doi:10.1177/239693938400800105. ISSN 0272-6122. S2CID 149087192.
