= Community of the Sisters of the Love of God =

Anglican religious order (1906-)

The Community of the Sisters of the Love of God (SLG) is an Anglican religious order of contemplative nuns founded in 1906 by George Seymour Hollings SSJE (1845–1914) within the Church of England.

The community has always drawn upon Carmelite spirituality.

== Overview ==
The community is at the Convent of the Incarnation, Fairacres, Oxford, England. Formerly it had houses at Boxmoor, Hemel Hempstead in Hertfordshire, Burwash in East Sussex, and Staplehurst in Kent. The community planned a convent in the Holy Land in the 1930s, but this phase of work never came to fruition, owing to the outbreak of the Second World War.

== SLG Press ==
The community has a small publishing house, SLG Press, which was founded in 1967 and produces a journal containing short theological papers twice a year, the Fairacres Chronicle. Their main publishing activity however is a list of over 200 short books on prayer and the spiritual life, including a significant collection of Syriac patristics works and a series of Contemplative Poetry. Authors include A. M Allchin, Prof. John Barton, Prof. Sebastian Brock, Revd John Chryssavgis, Dom Jean Leclercq OSB, André Louf OCSO, Prof. Andrew Louth, Prof. John McGuckin, Michael Ramsey, Dumitru Staniloae, Prof Columba Stewart OSB, Sr Benedicta Ward SLG, Metropolitan Kallistos Ware, ArchBp Rowan Williams. Its focus on Anglican theology and contemplative works makes it the spiritual successor to Pax House and Dacre Press (absorbed by Mowbrays), the publishing houses headed by Berta Travers (1881–1961), which focussed on ‘high-church’ Anglican theology and contemplative works that were often too niche for large commercial publishers.

== Notable people ==
- Margaret Sampson (Mother Mary Clare), Mother Superior from 1954 to 1973
- Benedicta Ward
- Father Gilbert Shaw, Warden SLG 1962–1967, notable teacher on prayer and campaigner for social welfare.
- Father A. M. (Donald) Allchin, Warden SLG, theologian and author on the life of prayer and on Christian Unity

== Bibliography ==
- Anson, Peter Frederick. The Call of the Cloister: Religious Communities and Kindred Bodies in the Anglican Communion. United States: Macmillan, 1953.
- Bhattacharji, Santha, Dominic Mattos, Rowan Williams. Prayer and Thought in Monastic Tradition: Essays in Honour of Benedicta Ward SLG. United Kingdom: Bloomsbury Publishing, 2014.
- Chance, Jane. Women Medievalists and the Academy, Volume 2. N.p.: Wipf & Stock Publishers, 2018.
- Cotter, Jim. Praying the Dark Hours: A Night Prayer Companion. United Kingdom: Hymns Ancient & Modern Limited, 2013.
- Davison, Andrew., Matthews, Anna., Milbank, Alison., North, Philip., Simmonds, Gemma., Thorpe, Ric., Williams, Rowan. God's Church in the World: The Gift of Catholic Mission. United Kingdom: Canterbury Press, 2020.
- Haste, Amanda J.. Music and Identity in Twenty-First-Century Monasticism. United Kingdom: Taylor & Francis, 2023.
- James, Serenhedd. The Cowley Fathers: A History of the English Congregation of the Society of St John the Evangelist. United Kingdom: Canterbury Press Norwich, 2019.
- Keller, David G R. Boundless Grandeur: The Christian Vision of A.M. 'Donald' Allchin. United Kingdom: James Clarke & Company, 2015.
- Miller, Lori M.. Femininities, Masculinities, National Identities: Anglican Religious Communities in Britain, 1845-1920. N.p.: Indiana University, 2004.
- Platten, Stephen, ed. Oneness: The Dynamics of Monasticism. United Kingdom: SCM Press, 2017.
- Reese, Abbie. Dedicated to God: An Oral History of Cloistered Nuns. United Kingdom: OUP USA, 2014.
- Rowell, Geoffrey, Kenneth Stevenson, Kenneth W. Stevenson, Rowan Williams. Love's Redeeming Work: The Anglican Quest for Holiness. United Kingdom: Oxford University Press, 2003.
- Whiteaker, Stafford. The Good Retreat Guide. United Kingdom: Penguin Random House, 2004.
