= Langeria =

- full leaf

Scientific classification
- Kingdom: Plantae
- Clade: Tracheophytes
- Clade: Angiosperms
- Clade: Eudicots
- Order: Proteales
- Family: Platanaceae
- Genus: †Langeria; Wolfe & Wehr
- Species: †L. magnifica

Binomial name
- †Langeria magnifica Wolfe & Wehr

Extinct genus of flowering plants

Isolated stipule

Langeria is an extinct genus of flowering plants in the family Platanaceae containing the solitary species Langeria magnifica. Langeria is known from fossil leaves and stipules found in the early Eocene deposits of northern Washington state, United States and similar aged formations in British Columbia, Canada.

== Distribution ==
Langeria magnifica has been identified from a series of locations ranging from the Klondike Mountain Formation near Republic, Washington north. At least three locations in British Columbia have Langeria fossils, including the Coldwater Beds Quilchena locality near Merritt, the Tranquille Formations McAbee Fossil Beds near Kamloops, and the Chu Chua Formations Joseph Creek site near Chu Chua. Generally speaking, the age for the locations is Early Eocene, with the sites that have current uranium–lead or argon–argon radiometric dates being of Ypresian age, while the undated sites and sites with less current dating being possibly slightly younger and Lutetian in age.

== History and classification ==
Langeria magnifica was described from a series of type specimens, the actual holotype specimen being UW 39713, in the paleobotanical collections of Burke Museum, University of Washington, and its counterpart being UCMP 9273, currently preserved in the University of California Museum of Paleontology. An additional eight leaves from both the Burke Museum and UC Museum of Paleontology were designated paratypes specimens. Working from those specimens, collected in the Republic, Washington area in the early 1980s, the fossils were studied by Jack A. Wolfe of the University of California and Wesley C. Wehr of the Burke Museum. They published their 1987 type description for the genus and species in a United States Geological Survey monograph on the North Eastern Washington dicot fossils. The genus name Langeria is a matronym honoring the American philosopher of mind, Susanne K. Langer, who influenced the analysis and organization of scientific data. The specific epithet magnifica would imply "magnificently large". Wolfe and Wehr note that the extinct species "Fortunearia" weedi is distinctly similar to Langeria magnifica and might turn out to be congeneric.

When first described, L. magnifica was placed in the family Hamamelidaceae, commonly known as the witch-hazel family, by Wolfe and Wehr. This placement was later questioned and the genus was subsequently reclassified by Indah Huegele and Steven Manchester (2022) as a member of the plane tree family Platanaceae. They noted a series of similarities with modern Platanus species, including tooth shape, petiole morphology, stipules, and variability between unlobed and three lobed morphology. However the combination of unlobed typical outline and associated Langeranthus dillhoffiorum fruits lead them to maintain Langeria as a separate genus.

== Description ==
The simple leaves of Langeria magnifica are pinnate in venation with an overall ovate to elliptical shape and an apex that is notably pointed. The leaves are often slightly asymmetric and very rarely can be tri-lobed with lengths ranging between 8.9–20.7 cm (3.5–8.1 in) and widths between 4.9–14.2 cm (1.9–5.6 in). The margin of the leaf has evenly spaced, distinct hook-shaped teeth with rounded sinuses separating them in sets of three to five teeth between each secondary vein. The teeth are entered by a secondary vein or by a veinlet from the loop of a secondary vein. The primary vein has between ten and twelve secondary veins diverging from it at low angles toward the apex and getting higher in angle towards the base. The simple or forking tertiary veins diverge from the 0.3–0.5 cm (0.12–0.20 in) apart, and the quaternary ones form a coarse reticulated pattern surrounding the areoles. The petiole can reach lengths of up to 6.2 cm (2.4 in) with a faired base which is hollow, being up to four times as wide as the petiole midpoint. The associated stipules are ochreate likely having wrapped fully around twigs or leaf bases. They have a leaflike structure and circular structure, with 5 to 15 half-circular shallow lobes around the margins. The internal vein structure forms a reticulated mesh patterning.

== Paleoenvironment ==
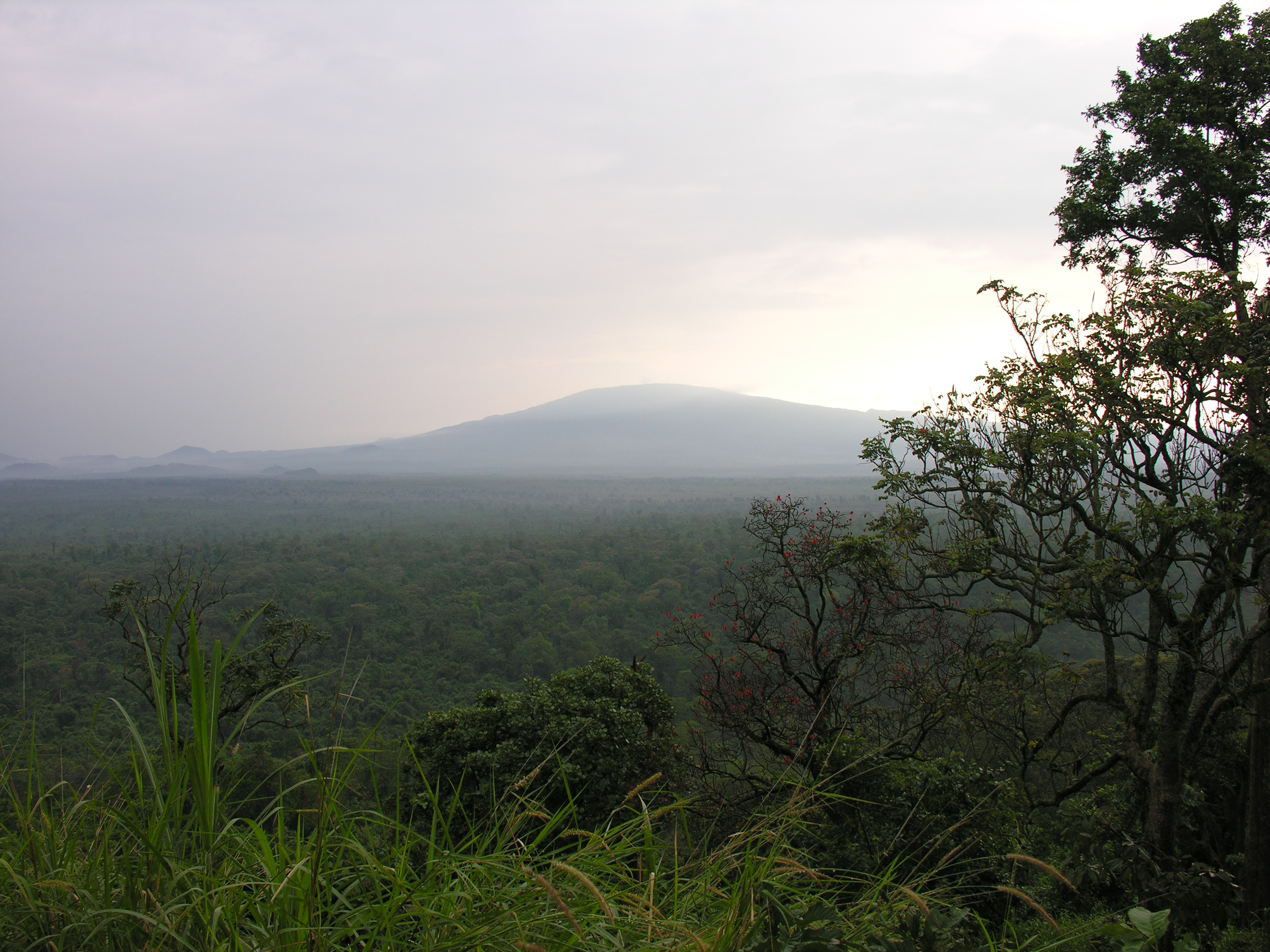
Virunga National Park, Albertine Rift, Africa

The Republic site is part of a larger fossil site system collectively known as the Eocene Okanagan Highlands. The highlands, including the Early Eocene formations between Driftwood Canyon at the north and Republic at the south, have been described as one of the "Great Canadian Lagerstätten" based on the diversity, quality and unique nature of the paleofloral and paleofaunal biotas that are preserved. The highlands temperate biome preserved across a large transect of lakes recorded many of the earliest appearances of modern genera, while also documenting the last stands of ancient lines. The warm temperate highland floras in association with downfaulted lacustrine basins and active volcanism are noted to have no exact modern equivalents. This is due to the more seasonally equitable conditions of the Early Eocene, resulting in much lower seasonal temperature shifts. However, the highlands have been compared to the upland ecological islands of the Virunga Mountains within the African rift valleys Albertine Rift.

The Klondike Mountain Formation represents pinpoint spot a long upland lake system series that was surrounded by a warm temperate ecosystem with nearby volcanism dating from during and just after the early Eocene climatic optimum. The Okanagan Highlands likely had a mesic upper microthermal to lower mesothermal climate, in which winter temperatures rarely dropped low enough for snow, and which were seasonably equitable. The paleoforest surrounding the lakes have been described as precursors to the modern temperate broadleaf and mixed forests of Eastern North America and Eastern Asia. Based on the fossil biotas the lakes were higher and cooler then the coeval coastal forests preserved in the Puget Group and Chuckanut Formation of Western Washington, which are described as lowland tropical forest ecosystems. Estimates of the paleoelevation range between 0.7 and 1.2 km (0.43 and 0.75 mi) higher than the coastal forests. This is consistent with the paleoelevation estimates for the lake systems, which range between 1.1 and 2.9 km (1,100 and 2,900 m), which is similar to the modern elevation 0.8 km (0.50 mi), but higher.

Estimates of the mean annual temperature have been derived from climate leaf analysis multivariate program (CLAMP) analysis and leaf margin analysis (LMA) of the Republic paleoflora. The CLAMP results after multiple linear regressions gave a mean annual temperature of approximately 8.0 °C (46.4 °F), with the LMA giving 9.2 ± 2.0 °C (48.6 ± 3.6 °F). A bioclimatic-based estimate based on modern relatives of the taxa found at Republic suggested mean annual temperatures around 13.5 ± 2.2 °C (56.3 ± 4.0 °F). This is lower than the mean annual temperature estimates given for the coastal Puget Group, which is estimated to have been between 15 and 18.6 °C (59.0 and 65.5 °F). The bioclimatic analysis for Republic suggests a mean annual precipitation amount of 115 ± 39 cm (45 ± 15 in).
