= Benedicta Ward =

British theologian and historian (1933–2022)

Sister Benedicta Ward SLG
- Born: Florence Margaret Ward; 4 February 1933; Durham, England
- Died: 23 May 2022 (aged 89)

Academic background
- Education: St Anne's College, Oxford; University of Manchester
- Thesis: Miracles and Miracle Collections, 1015–1215 (1978)
- Doctoral advisor: R. W. Southern

Academic work
- Discipline: Theology; history
- Sub-discipline: History of Christianity
- Institutions: Harris Manchester College, Oxford
- Main interests: Early Christian spirituality; Desert Fathers

Benedicta Ward (born Florence Margaret Ward, 4 February 1933 – 23 May 2022) was a Church of England nun, theologian and historian. She was a member of the Anglican religious order, the Community of the Sisters of the Love of God and reader in early Christian spirituality at Harris Manchester College, University of Oxford. She was particularly known for her research on the Desert Fathers, popularising the collection of their writings known as the Apophthegmata Patrum. She wrote extensively on Anselm of Canterbury and Bede.

== Life ==
Florence Margaret Ward was born in Durham to Methodist parents; her father had left the Church of England to marry his Methodist wife and had become a minister in his new denomination.

She came to high church Anglicanism through the beauty of choral evensong. At the age of 22 she entered the Community of the Sisters of the Love of God, an enclosed community of Anglican contemplative nuns at Fairacres in East Oxford, as Sister Benedicta of Jesus.

== Works ==
Ward wrote a number of books and articles, including translations of premodern texts. She was also a regular public speaker, including on the BBC series A History of the World in 100 Objects. A festschrift was published in her honour in 2014.

=== Books ===
- Ward, Benedicta (1973). The prayers and meditations of St. Anselm. Penguin classics. Harmondsworth: Penguin. ISBN 978-0-14-044278-6.
- Ward, Benedicta (1975). The sayings of the Desert Fathers: the alphabetical collection. London: Mowbray. ISBN 978-0-264-66124-7.
- Ward, Benedicta (1975). The wisdom of the Desert Fathers: the Apophthegmata Patrum (the anonymous series). Fairacres publications. Oxford: SLG Press. ISBN 978-0-7283-0034-7.
- Ward, Benedicta (1976). The Influence of Saint Bernard: Anglican essays. Oxford: SLG Press. ISBN 978-0-7283-0061-3.
- Ward, Benedicta (1977). Anselm of Canterbury, a monastic scholar: an expanded version of a paper given to the Anselm Society, St. Augustine's College, Canterbury, in May 1973. Fairacres publications. Oxford: SLG Press. ISBN 978-0-7283-0067-5.
- Ward, Benedicta (1978). Liturgy today: the Divine office and the eucharist. Fairacres publications. Oxford: SLG Press. ISBN 978-0-7283-0028-6.
- Ward, Benedicta (1987). Miracles and the medieval mind: theory, record and event, 1000–1215 (2 ed.). Aldershot, Hampshire: Scolar Press. ISBN 978-0-85967-731-8. [Revised version of her thesis: Ward, Benedicta (1978). "Miracles and miracle collections, 1015-1215" (Document). University of Oxford.]
- Ward, Benedicta (1987). Harlots of the desert: a study of repentance in early monastic sources. London: Mowbray. ISBN 978-0-264-67152-9.
- Ward, Benedicta (1988). The desert of the heart: Daily readings with the Desert Fathers. London: Darton, Longman and Todd. ISBN 978-0-232-51769-9.
- Leech, Kenneth; Ward, Sr Benedicta SLG (1978). Julian Reconsidered. Fairacres publications. Oxford: SLG Press. ISBN 978-0-7283-0122-1.
- Ward, Benedicta (1990). Daily readings with the desert fathers. Springfield, IL: Templegate. ISBN 978-0-87243-185-0.
- Ward, Benedicta (1990). The venerable Bede. Outstanding Christian thinkers. London: Chapman. ISBN 978-0-225-66574-1.
- Ward, Benedicta (1991). Bede and the psalter. Jarrow lecture. Vol. 1991. Jarrow on Tyne: Bealls.
- Intellectual life in the Middle Ages: essays presented to Margaret Gibson. Lesley Smith, Benedicta Ward (eds.). London: Hambledon Press. 1992. ISBN 978-1-85285-069-2.
- Ward, Benedicta (1992). Signs and wonders: saints, miracles, and prayer from the 4th century to the 14th. Collected studies. Aldershot, Hampshire: Variorum. ISBN 978-0-86078-316-9.
- Ward, Benedicta (1999). High king of heaven: aspects of early English spirituality. London: Mowbray. ISBN 978-0-264-67446-9.
- An introduction to Christian spirituality. Ralph Waller, Benedicta Ward (eds.). London: SPCK. 1999. ISBN 978-0-281-05226-4.
- Ward, Benedicta (2002). Bede and the Psalter. Fairacres publications. Oxford: SLG Press. ISBN 978-0-7283-0159-7.
- Ward, Benedicta (2001). Pilgrimage of the heart. Fairacres publications. Oxford: SLG Press. ISBN 978-0-7283-0155-9.
- Ward, Benedicta (2002). The English mystics revisited. Oxford: Farmington Institute for Christian Studies.
- Joy of heaven: springs of Christian spirituality. Benedicta Ward, Ralph Waller (eds.). London: SPCK. 2003. ISBN 978-0-281-05496-1.
- Ward, Benedicta (2003). The Desert Fathers: sayings of the early Christian monks. London: Penguin Books. ISBN 978-0-14-044731-6. [Systematic or thematically arranged collection of sayings from the Desert Fathers]
- Ward, Benedicta (2004). Bede, teacher of the English. Oxford: Farmington Institute for Christian Studies.
- Ward, Benedicta (2007). A True Easter: The Synod of Whitby 664 AD. Fairacres publications. Oxford: SLG Press. ISBN 978-0-7283-0170-2.
- Ward, Benedicta (2008). Christ within me: prayers and meditations from the Anglo-Saxon tradition (2 ed.). Kalamazoo, MI: Cistercian Publications. ISBN 978-0-87907-213-1.
- Ward, Benedicta (2009). Anselm of Canterbury: his life and legacy. London: SPCK. ISBN 978-0-281-06104-4.
- Ward, Benedicta (2012). The Our Father. Fairacres publications. Oxford: SLG Press. ISBN 978-0-7283-0202-0.
- Williams, Rowan; Ward, Benedicta (2012). Bede's ecclesiastical history of the English people: an introduction and selection. London: Bloomsbury. ISBN 978-1-4411-2354-1.
- Ward, Benedicta; Savage, Paul; Elder, E. Rozanne (2012). The great beginning of Cîteaux: a narrative of the beginning of the Cistercian order: the Exordium magnum of Conrad of Eberbach. Cistercian fathers series. Trappist, KY: Cistercian Publications. ISBN 978-0-87907-172-1.
- Ward, Benedicta (2016). Monastic hours of prayer. Fairacres publications. Oxford: SLG Press. ISBN 978-0-7283-0283-9.
- Ward, Benedicta (2016). In Company with Christ. Fairacres publications. Oxford: SLG Press. ISBN 978-0-7283-0293-8.
- Ward, Benedicta (2018). Give love and receive the Kingdom. Brewster, MA: Paraclete Press. ISBN 978-1-64060-097-3.

=== Articles ===
- Ward, Benedicta (1970). "The Wounds of Christ: Reflections on this Devotion in the Middle Ages and in the Methodist Revival". Fairacres Chronicle. 2 (4): 25–29.
- Ward, Benedicta (1972). "Enthusiasm in the "Exordium magnum cisterciense"". Cistercian Studies. 7: 154–159.
- Ward, Benedicta (1973). "La conférence internationale d'études sur S. Pierre Damien du 2 au 7 octobre 1972". Collectanea Cisterciensia. 35: 149–151.
- Ward, Benedicta (1973). "L'enthousiasme religieux dans le Grand Exorde cistercien. "Exordium Magnum Cisterciense", de Conrad, moine d'Eberbach". Collectanea Cisterciensia. 35: 58–63.
- Ward, Benedicta (1973). "The place of St Anselm in the development of Christian prayer". Cistercian Studies. 8: 72–81.
- Ward, Benedicta (1973). "St Bernard and the Anglican Divines: Reflections on Mark Frank's Sermon for the Circumcision". Bernard of Clairvaux: studies presented to Dom Jean Leclercq. Cistercian studies. Washington, DC: Cistercian Publications. pp. 187–195. ISBN 978-0-87907-823-2.
- Ward, Benedicta (1974). "Charismatic prayer and monastic liturgy". Cistercian Studies. 9: 366–375.
- Ward, Benedicta (1976). "'Faith Seeking Understanding': Anselm of Canterbury and Julian of Norwich". Julian of Norwich: four studies to commemorate the sixth centenary of the revelations of divine love. Oxford: SLG Press. pp. 26–31. ISBN 978-0-7283-0022-4.
- Ward, Benedicta (1976). "Miracles and history: a reconsideration of the miracle stories used by Bede". In Gerald Bonner (ed.). Famulus Christi: essays in commemoration of the thirteenth centenary of the birth of the Venerable Bede. London: SPCK. pp. 70–76. ISBN 978-0-281-02949-5.
- Ward, Benedicta (1976). "The desert myth: reflections on the desert ideal in early Cistercian monasticism". In M. Basil Pennington (ed.). One yet two: monastic tradition, East and West: Orthodox-Cistercian Symposium, Oxford University, 26 August–1 September, 1973. Cistercian studies. Kalamazoo, Mich: Cistercian Publications. pp. 183–199. ISBN 978-0-87907-829-4.
- Ward, Benedicta (1977). "The relationship between hermits and communities in the west with special reference to the twelfth century". In A. M. Allchin (ed.). Solitude and communion: papers on the hermit life given at St David's, Wales in the autumn of 1975. Fairacres publication. Oxford: SLG Press. pp. 54–63. ISBN 978-0-7283-0072-9.
- Ward, Benedicta (1981). "The miracles of Saint Benedict". In E. Rozanne Elder (ed.). Benedictus, studies in honor of St Benedict of Nursia. Cistercian studies. Kalamazoo, Mich: Cistercian Publications. pp. 1–14. ISBN 978-0-87907-867-6.
- Ward, Benedicta (1982). "'Signs and Wonders': Miracles in the Desert Tradition". Studia Patristica. 18: 539–542.
- Ward, Benedicta (1983). "'Inward feeling and deep thinking': The Prayers and Meditations of St Anselm Revisited". Anselm Studies. 1: 177–184.
- Ward, Benedicta (1984). "Traditions of Spiritual Guidance: Spiritual direction in the Desert Fathers". The Way. 24. 24 (1): 61–70.
- Ward, Benedicta (1984). "Laudabiliter vixit: The Death of the Saints in Some 12th-Century Sources". Fairacres Chronicle. 17 (1): 7–13.
- Ward, Benedicta (1985). "Apophthegmata Matrum". Studia Patristica. 16: 63–66.
- Ward, Benedicta (1985). "The desert of the heart: Importance of the desert fathers today". Holy Land. 5 (1): 14–21.
- Ward, Benedicta (1985). "The image of the prostitute in the Middle Ages". Monastic Studies. 16: 39–49.
- Ward, Benedicta (1985). "A Converting Ordinance: Some reflections on the hymns of Charles Wesley in the light of medieval biblical commentary". Fairacres Chronicle. 21 (1): 13–25.
- Ward, Benedicta (1985). "Bede and the conversion of the Anglo-Saxons". Word and Spirit. 7: 34–46.
- Ward, Benedicta (1986). "Gregory the Great". In Cheslyn Jones; Geoffrey Wainwright; Edward Yarnold (eds.). The Study of spirituality. New York: Oxford University Press. pp. 277–280. ISBN 978-0-19-504169-9.
- Ward, Benedicta (1986). "Anselm of Canterbury". In Cheslyn Jones; Geoffrey Wainwright; Edward Yarnold (eds.). The Study of spirituality. New York: Oxford University Press. pp. 280–282. ISBN 978-0-19-504169-9.
- Ward, Benedicta (1986). "The new orders". In Cheslyn Jones; Geoffrey Wainwright; Edward Yarnold (eds.). The Study of spirituality. New York: Oxford University Press. pp. 283–291. ISBN 978-0-19-504169-9.
- Ward, Benedicta (1986). "A Tractarian inheritance: the religious life in a patristic perspective". In Geoffrey Rowell (ed.). Tradition renewed: the Oxford Movement Conference papers. London: Darton, Longman, and Todd. pp. 214–225. ISBN 978-0-915138-82-1.
- Ward, Benedicta (1987). "Translator's charity". In William Radice; Barbara Reynolds (eds.). The Translator's art: essays in honour of Betty Radice. Harmondsworth, Middlesex: Penguin Books. pp. 206–262. ISBN 978-0-14-009226-4.
- Ward, Benedicta (1989). "The spirituality of St. Cuthbert". In Gerald Bonner; D. W. Rollason; Clare Stancliffe (eds.). St. Cuthbert, his cult and his community to AD 1200. Woodbridge, Suffolk: Boydell Press. pp. 65–76. ISBN 978-0-85115-510-4.
- Ward, Benedicta (1989). "The religious world of the twelfth century, II: Anselm of Canterbury and his influence". Christian spirituality 1. pp. 196–205.
- Ward, Benedicta (1990). "Saints and Sybils: Hildegard of Bingen to Teresa of Avila". In Janet Martin Soskice (ed.). After Eve: Women, theology, and the Christian tradition. London: Marshall Pickering. pp. 103–118. ISBN 978-0-551-02039-9.
- Ward, Benedicta (1991). "Theodore of Tarsus: a Greek archbishop of Canterbury". Sobornost. 13: 41–53.
- Ward, Benedicta (1992). "Two letters relating to relics of St. Thomas of Canterbury". Intellectual life in the Middle Ages: essays presented to Margaret Gibson. Lesley Smith, Benedicta Ward (eds.). London: Hambledon Press. pp. 175–184. ISBN 978-1-85285-069-2.
- Ward, Benedicta (1992). "Discernment: a rare bird". The Way. Supplement 64: 10–18.
- Ward, Benedicta (1992). "Lady Julian and her audience: "mine even-Christian"". In Geoffrey Rowell (ed.). The English religious tradition and the genius of Anglicanism. Wantage: Ikon. pp. 47–63. ISBN 978-1-871805-01-7.
- Ward, Benedicta (1993). "'In medium duorum animalium': Bede and Jerome on the Canticle of Habakkuk". Studia Patristica. 25: 189–193.
- Ward, Benedicta (1995). ""To my dearest sister": Bede and the educated woman". In Lesley Smith; Jane H. M. Taylor (eds.). Women, the book, and the godly: selected proceedings of the St. Hilda's conference, 1993. Woodbridge, Suffolk: Brewer. pp. 105–111. ISBN 978-0-85991-420-8.
- Ward, Benedicta (1997). "St Frideswide of Oxford". In Henry Wansbrough; Anthony Marett-Crosby (eds.). Benedictines in Oxford. London: Darton, Longman and Todd. pp. 3–10, 278. ISBN 978-0-232-52176-4.
- Ward, Benedicta (1999). "Monks and miracle". In John C. Cavadini (ed.). Miracles in Jewish and Christian antiquity: imagining truth. Notre Dame studies in theology. Notre Dame, IN: University of Notre Dame Press. pp. 127–137. ISBN 978-0-268-01217-5.
- Ward, Benedicta (1999). "The medieval West". In Adrian Hastings (ed.). A world history of Christianity. Grand Rapids, MI: Eerdmans. pp. 110–146. ISBN 978-0-8028-2442-4.
- Ward, Benedicta (2000). "Pastoral care and the monks: 'Whose feet do you wash?'". In G. R. Evans (ed.). A history of pastoral care. London: Cassell. pp. 77–91. ISBN 978-0-225-66840-7.
- Ward, Benedicta (2001). "Bede the theologian". The medieval theologians. pp. 57–64.
- Ward, Benedicta (2003). "Anselmo di Canterbury: maestro di preghiera". In Inos Biffi; Costante Marabelli; Stefano Maria Malaspina; Ermanno Bencivenga (eds.). Anselmo d'Aosta, educatore europeo: convegno di studi, Saint-Vincent, 7-8 maggio 2002. Biblioteca di cultura medievale. Milan: Jaca. pp. 135–156. ISBN 978-88-16-40624-7.
- Ward, Benedicta (2004). "Beda Venerabilis: "Doctor Anglorum"". In Johannes Arnold; Rainer Berndt; Ralf M. W. Stammberger (eds.). Väter der Kirche: ekklesiales Denken von den Anfängen bis in die Neuzeit: Festgabe für Hermann Josef Sieben, SJ, zum 70. Geburtstag. Paderborn: Ferdinand Schöningh. pp. 533–542. ISBN 978-3-506-70423-8.
- Ward, Benedicta (2008). "The prayers and meditations of St. Anselm of Canterbury". In Roy Hammerling (ed.). A history of prayer: the first to the fifteenth century. Brill's companions to the Christian tradition. Leiden: Brill. pp. 243–254. doi:10.1163/ej.9789004171220.i-460.68. ISBN 978-90-04-17122-0.
- Ward, Benedicta (2010). "Relics and the medieval mind". International Journal for the Study of the Christian Church. 10 (4): 274–286. doi:10.1080/1474225X.2010.506763. ISSN 1474-225X. S2CID 170413618.
- Ward, Benedicta (2011). "Miracles in the Middle Ages". In Graham H. Twelftree (ed.). The Cambridge Companion to Miracles. Cambridge: Cambridge University Press. pp. 149–164. doi:10.1017/CCOL9780521899864.009. ISBN 978-0-511-97639-1.
