= Anna Clarke =

British mystery novelist

- Born: 28 April 1919; Cape Town, South Africa
- Died: 7 November 2004 (aged 85); Brighton, England
- Other names: Anna Emilia Clarke; Anna Hackel
- Education: London External, B.Sc. 1945; Open University, B.A. 1973; University of Sussex, M.A. 1975
- Occupations: Writer, private secretary
- Organizations: British Federation of University Women; Crime Writers' Association; Society of Authors
- Spouse(s): David Hackel (1947), divorced 1957
- Parents: Fred Clarke; Edith Annie (Gillams) Clarke

Anna Clarke (28 April 1919 – 7 November 2004) was a British author of mystery novels popular in the United States and the United Kingdom. The novels belong to a subgenre known as the cosy mystery. Jack Adrian, writing for The Independent, says, "In classic 'cosy' territory the puzzle is all, and the sleuths, of both sexes, tend either to the genteel and spinsterish (variations of Miss Marple from Agatha Christie, and Miss Maud Silver from Patricia Wentworth), or to be fussbudget busybodies with loud, horsy laughs and pushy manners." In many of Clarke's later novels, the sleuth is Paula Glenning, a professor of literature. Glenning has been described as "an intellectual who solves crimes with research, dialogue, and brains rather than muscles and violence."

Clarke began her career as a private secretary for the London publishing firms Victor Gollancz Ltd (1947–50) and Eyre & Spottiswoode (1951–52) and as administrative secretary for the British Association for American Studies (1956–62). She began writing mysteries after a long illness that interrupted her career, and her first success as a crime writer came in 1968, when she was 49 years old.

Born in 1919 in Cape Town, South Africa, she was the daughter of Fred and Edith Gillams Clarke, both educators. Fred Clarke, later knighted, taught in Cape Town, then in Montreal, Canada, and finally in Oxford, England. Interested in economics, Anna Clarke completed a Bachelor of Science degree at London External in 1945. After working for publishing companies, she returned to school, completing a Bachelor of Arts via the Open University in 1973 and a Master of Arts at the University of Sussex in 1975.

Clarke was a member of the British Federation of University Women, the Crime Writers' Association, and the Society of Authors. She married David Hackel in 1947, divorced in 1957, and died in 2004.

== Bibliography ==
=== Mystery novels ===
- The Darkened Room (1968) OCLC 779217947
- A Mind to Murder (1971) OCLC 16199408
- The End of a Shadow (1972) OCLC 650797
- Plot Counter-Plot (1974) OCLC 1230330
- My Search for Ruth (1975) OCLC 704898434
- Legacy of Evil (1976) OCLC 16290526
- The Deathless and the Dead (1976) OCLC 695917593
- This Downhill Path (1977) OCLC 3189760
- The Lady in Black (1977) OCLC 3630102
- Letter from the Dead (1977) OCLC 458587180
- One of Us Must Die (1978) OCLC 4271646
- The Poisoned Web (1979) OCLC 5718411
- Poison Parsley (1979) OCLC 1106695797
- Last Voyage (1980) OCLC 7440644
- Game Set and Danger (1981) OCLC 7615650
- Desire To Kill (1982) OCLC 8109337
- We the Bereaved (1982) OCLC 1053917146
- Soon She Must Die (1983) OCLC 9576440
- Last Judgment (1985) OCLC 10924834
- Cabin 3033 (1986) OCLC 12371402
- The Mystery Lady (1986) OCLC 13360609
- Last Seen in London (1987) OCLC 14718974
- Murder in Writing (1988) OCLC 16755350
- The Whitelands Affair (1989) OCLC 18559525
- The Case of the Paranoid Patient (1991) OCLC 22907445
- The Case of the Ludicrous Letters (1994) OCLC 29555277
- The Case of the Anxious Aunt (1996) OCLC 34585589

=== Other ===
As Anna Hackel

- Assisted in the translation of Karl Abraham, Clinical Papers and Essays on Psychoanalysis (1955) OCLC 1066115146
