= The Moot =

WW2-era Christian political circle

The Moot was a discussion group concerned with education, social reconstruction, and the role of culture in society. It was convened by J. H. Oldham, editor of the Christian Newsletter, and its participants were mainly Christian intellectuals. Karl Mannheim was a central figure in the group. Others who attended included T. S. Eliot, John Middleton Murry, Sir Fred Clarke, Michael Polanyi, Reinhold Niebuhr, Paul Tillich, Sir Walter Moberly, John Baillie, Sir Hector Herrington, Geoffrey Vickers, A. R. Vidler, H. A. Hodges, and Adolph Lowe. Catholic historian and independent scholar Christopher Dawson also contributed numerous written submissions, although he was able to attend only two meetings.

The discussion group grew out of a Conference on Church, Community and State held at Oxford in 1937.

More than anything else, the discussions of the Moot revolved around the topic of order and, more particularly, around the problem of how order might be restored in British society and culture in the context of a "world turned upside down". (Mullins and Jacobs, 2006)

The discussions influenced T. S. Eliot's works of cultural criticism The Idea of a Christian Society and Notes Towards the Definition of Culture.

== Collections ==
The University of Leeds holds a collection of papers and letters concerning The Moot donated by Rev. O.S. Tomkins. The Institute of Education (IOE), University College London holds Sir Fred Clarke's set of The Moot's circulated discussion papers, 1939-1942, which were given to the IOE by Lewis Arnaud Reid when he retired.

== Bibliography ==
- Oxford Dictionary of National Biography
- The Moot Papers: Faith, Freedom and Society 1938-1944, ed. Keith Clements (London: T & T Clark, 2010) details
- Kojecky, Roger, T.S. Eliot's Social Criticism, 1971, revised edn. 2014. Ch 9 'A Christian Elite' gives an extended account of The Moot.
- Kurlberg, Jonas, "Resisting Totalitarianism: The Moot and a New Christendom", Religion Compass, Volume 7, Issue 12, December 2013, Pages 517-531
- Mullins, Phil and Jacobs, Struan. T.S. Eliot’s Idea of the Clerisy, and its Discussion by Karl Mannheim and Michael Polanyi in the Context of J.H. Oldham's Moot, Journal of Classical Sociology, vol. 6, 2006, pp. 147–156
- Mullins, Phil and Jacobs, Struan, Michael Polanyi and Karl Mannheim, Tradition & Discovery: The Polanyi Society Periodical, vol. 32, no. 1, 2005, pp. 20–43.
- Schuchard, Margret, ‘T.S. Eliot and Adolph Lowe in Dialogue The Oxford Ecumenical Conference and After - New Letters and More about the Moot’, AAA: Arbeiten aus Anglistik und Amerikanistik, Bd. 31, H. 1 (2006), pp. 3–24.
- Vickers, Jeanne, ed. (1991), Rethinking the Future: The Correspondence Between Geoffrey Vickers and Adolph Lowe, New Brunswick, NJ: Transaction Publishers
- Vidler, A. R., Scenes from a Clerical Life, 1977, includes reminiscences by a core member of The Moot.
