= Philosophy in a New Key =

Book by Susanne Langer

Philosophy in a New Key: A Study in the Symbolism of Reason, Rite and Art
- Cover of the first edition
- Author: Susanne K. Langer
- Language: English
- Subject: Philosophy
- Publication date: 1942
- Publication place: United States
- Media type: Print

Philosophy in a New Key: A Study in the Symbolism of Reason, Rite and Art is the main work of American philosopher Susanne K. Langer, first published in 1941. In it she declares that "Symbolism was the ‘new key’ to understanding how the human mind transformed the primal need to express oneself."

== Synopsis ==
"Langer elaborates her thesis in freshly conceived and interesting studies contained in chapters treating of the logic of signs and symbols, a comparison of discursive and presentational forms of symbolism (perhaps the heart of the book), verbal language, life symbols as the roots of sacrament and myth, the significance of music, the genesis of artistic import, and the fabric of meaning."
