= Macginicarpa =

Macginicarpa Temporal range: Early Paleocene–Early Oligocene
- Macginicarpa manchesteri fruit

Scientific classification
- Kingdom: Plantae
- Clade: Tracheophytes
- Clade: Angiosperms
- Clade: Eudicots
- Order: Proteales
- Family: Platanaceae
- Genus: †Macginicarpa; S.R.Manchester

Species
- M. glabra; M. manchesteri

Extinct genus of flowering plants

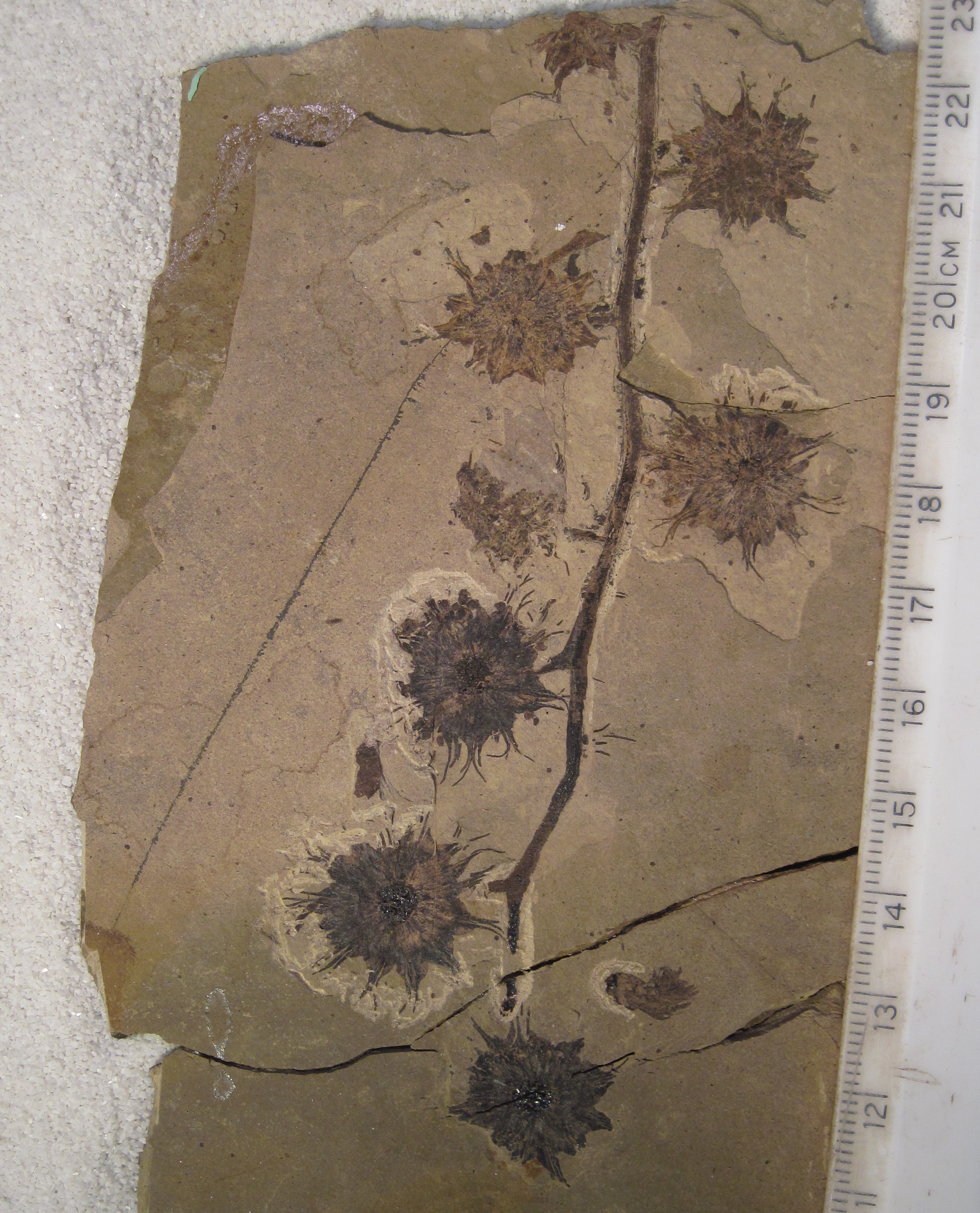
Macginicarpa sp. raceme Klondike Mountain Formation

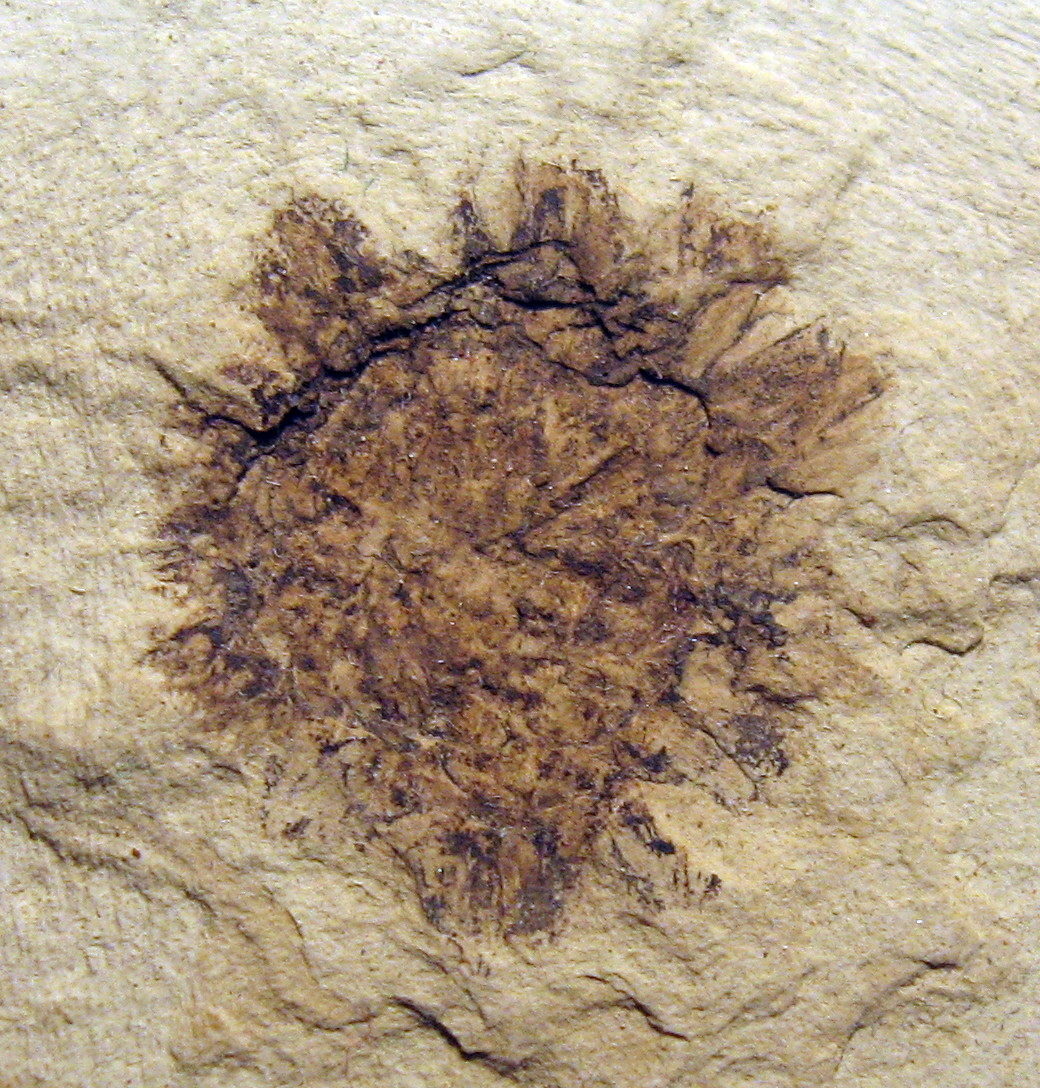
Macginicarpa sp fruit Green River Formation

Macginicarpa sp achenes Klondike Mountain Formation

Macginicarpa is an extinct morphogenus plane tree/sycamore family fruits related to the leaf morphogenus Macginitiea. Two species have been described, the type species Macginicarpa glabra, and a contentious second species, Macginicarpa manchesteri, though fossils from a number of location have been identified as Macginicarpa without species placement.

The fruits have been found in fossil strata ranging in age between the Early Paleocene to the Early Oligocene across western North America in western and central North America of Canada and the United States. In conjunction with a series of other fossil morphotaxa, Macginicarpa species fruits have been included in the "whole plant" reconstruction of two extinct trees, the "Clarno plane" and the "Joffrea plane". Several suggestions have been put forward for the eventual extinct of the genus, with dropping temperatures in the Oligocene or interactions with new taxa crossing landbridges. Its also possible the genus survived longer than known, but lack of proper conditions for fossilization prevented its documentation.

== Age and distribution ==
The oldest occurrences of Macginicarpa are found in Paleocene sediments in north central North America. Macginicarpa manchesteri is known from the type locality at Joffre Bridge in Central Alberta. The site has strata of the Paskapoo Formation which is dated to the Paleocene, specifically the North American land mammal ages Late Tiffanian. To the south in the Williston Basin of Montana, the Seven Mile Creek site also contains M. manchesteri. This site is in the Fort Union Formation which dates to the Paleocene, and spans the full epoch, so the exact age of the specimens is unreported. North Dakota hosts two separate reports for the genus, another Williston Basin outcropping of the Fort Union Formation has an unidentified species of Macginicarpa, while the Sentinel Butte Formation around Almont preserves M. glabra.

Within the Eocene, a number of locations in western North America have either Macginicarpa glabra or undescribed Macginicarpa fossils. The Ypresian age Eocene Okanagan Highlands paleolakes in British Columbia and Washington have several documented occurrences of undescribed fruits with Macginitiea gracilis. These include sites of the Klondike Mountain Formation around Republic, Washington, the Allenby Formation around Princeton and the "Horsefly shales" at Horsefly, British Columbia. Also Ypresian, the Green River Formation of Colorado, Utah, and Wyoming has had Macginicarpa species specimens reported along with Macginitiea wyomingensis leaves. In California, Macginicarpa fossils of the Ypresian Ione Formations Chalk Bluffs flora are found alongside both Macginitiea angustiloba and Macginitiea whitneyi plus Macginistemon mikanoides stamen groups.

Dating from the middle Eocene Bartonian stage, a lowland occurrence is also reported from Washington is the northern most site for M. glabra. Fruits associated with Macginitiea angustiloba are known from the Tukwila Formation Steels Crossing outcrop just south of Seattle, Washington. The Formation is part of the Puget Group marine and deltaic sediments preserving a tropical coastal area environment. The southern most reported occurrence of Macginicarpa comes from northeastern Texas in Titus County. Sandstone outcrops around Mount Pleasant are part of the Wilcox Group, a series of rock units ranging between Paleocene to Eocene in age, with the Mount Pleasant unit being listed as Eocene but not given a specific dating. Oregon hosts several occurrences of Macginicarpa, all within the John Day River basin and the associated John Day Fossil Beds National Monument. The type locality for both the genus and type species comes from the older Clarno Formation which has an age range of Middle to Late Eocene. Additional specimens that are not placed in a named species have been recovered in the overlying John Day Formations Sumner Spring florule at Gray Butte, Oregon. Age estimates for this formation range from the Late Eocene into the Early Oligocene, giving the youngest potential age for Macginicarpa specimens.

== History and classification ==
Early reports of the fruits now called Macginicarpa extend back to 1887 when U.S. Geological Survey paleontologist Lester Ward identified several fruiting bodies from the Fort Union Formation as Sparganium stygium, a monocot taxon first named from Swiss fossils. The fruits remained identified as Sparganium, through the next century, with the only change being a move by Roland Brown to Sparganium antiquum in 1962. In 2014 the Paleocene floras detailed by Brown were reevaluated by paleobotanist Steven Manchester, who recognized the misidentification of the fruits and moved them to macginicarpa manchesteri. A similar situation unfolded on the west coast starting in 1941 with paleobotanist Harry MacGinities paper on the Chalk Bluff Flora in California. He placed unnamed fruits into the sweet gum fossil species Liquidambar californica named by Leo Lesquereux in 1878.

Within a 1986 paper describing the whole plant "Clarno Plane tree" concept, Steven Manchester described a series of compression and premineralized fruits from the Clarno Formation. Manchester named the new fruit morphogenus Macginicarpa as a reference to the association of the fruit to Macginitiea leaf fossils, with Macginitiea being named in honor of paleobotanist Harry Dunlap MacGinitie. Manchester did not give an explanation of the species name glabra. The holotype chosen was IU5153, an isolated silicified fruit which is broken in half and shows the internal anatomy. The holotype plus a series of sixteen silicified paratype specimens and a single compression paratype were all housed at Indiana University in Bloomington, Indiana. Two additional compression fossil paratypes were also designated, one in the Oregon Museum of Science and Industry collections and one housed at the University of California Museum of Paleontology.

Five years later a group of Alberta Paleocene fossils were described by paleobotanists Kathleen Pigg and Ruth Stockey. In their 1991 Review of Palaeobotany and Palynology article they named a second species of Macginicarpa as M. manchesteri based on the holotype, University of Alberta Paleobotanical Collection UAPC-ALTA S10585, and a series of ten UAPC-ALTA paratypes. Pigg and Stockey chose the species name "manchesteri" as a patronym honoring Steven Manchester in recognition of his contributions to angiosperm paleobotany.

The California fossils were briefly reevaluated by Manchester (1986) and placed within Macginicarpa as conspecific with Macginicarpa glabra, while Republic and Green River Formation specimens were identified as Macginicarpa sp. Huegele and Correa Narvaez in 2023 briefly reevaluated the genus and species, noting that the differences between M. glabra and M. manchesteri are minimal, with the possibility that a fuller evaluation my result in synonymizing

== Description ==
Macginicarpa species fruits are globe shaped female flower to fruit groups, termed infructescences, born in series on thick stalks on a long naked raceme. Each flower-fruit head has florets organized in groupings of five and are missing any trichomes when mature. The fruits have a perianth still present when mature. Both the presence of a perianth, and the florets groupings of five are cited in the separation of Cretaceous age fruits from the Amur Region of Russia into the related morphogenus Kunduricarpus. The Eocene morphogenus Gynoplatananthus from the Appian way Flora on Vancouver Island was named on the basis of having stamens present at the fruiting head base, but later reports of the same or similar structures on Macginicarpa by Indah Huegele in 2023 raised the possibility that Gynoplatananthus might be synonymous with Macginicarpa. While the original description of Macginicarpa included fruits that were also sessile on the raceme, later investigation showed those to belong a different plantanaceous taxon and they were moved to the morphogenus Chemurnautia in 2022.

=== M. glabra ===
The described Macginicarpa glabra racemes are incomplete and the longest preserved section was 6 cm (2.4 in) with seven fruits, indicating that mature racemes were at least that length. The fruits are placed between 6–8 mm (0.24–0.31 in) apart on the racemes, and each fruit is born on a 3–20 mm (0.12–0.79 in) long peduncle. Young floral heads that haven't entered a fruiting stage are packed with numerous florets each between 1.8–2.5 mm (0.071–0.098 in) long with a topping style that often has a curved tip. The receptacle core is can be slightly larger than that of M. manchesteri, with a diameter between 3–6 mm (0.12–0.24 in), however the overall maturing heads are slightly smaller in M. glabra, being 10–15 mm (0.39–0.59 in) in diameter. In total the heads are comprised of approximately 60 florets densely placed on the core. The individual florets typically have five pentagonally placed dry achene type fruits, though a single floret was reported with six achenes. Each grouping is surrounded by a whorl of 15 to 30 tepals that are of equal height as the achenes.

=== M. manchesteri ===
The Macginicarpa manchesteri racemes are known from 1 mm (0.039 in) wide axis of at least 5.5 cm (2.2 in) in length, though all examples are incomplete. The individual fruits are produced by the stem in an alternate to subopposite placement along either side of the raceme with spacing ranging between 2–15 mm (0.079–0.591 in) and the individual fruit stalks are 10–16 mm (0.39–0.63 in) long. The fruits have a receptacle core around 2–5 mm (0.079–0.197 in) in diameter surrounded by closely packed florets or fruits depending on maturity, with the full flower heads being 10–16 mm (0.39–0.63 in) while fruit heads are 1.6–1.9 cm (0.63–0.75 in). The maturity of the flower or fruit is identified by the carpel size which increases with maturity, and carpel cluster density which is tighter in the immature flowering heads. Some raceme specimens have immature and maturing fruits associated. The single carpels are 2.7–3.6 mm (0.11–0.14 in) long and mature into dry achenes that are 3.7–6.5 mm (0.15–0.26 in) long. The elliptical achenes have an attached style of up to 6 mm (0.24 in) in length that is devoid of dispersal hairs like those found on modern Platanus seeds.

== Whole plant reconstructions ==
The separate naming of multiple fossil plant organs from a single organism, which meets the International Code of Nomenclature for algae, fungi, and plants standards for a whole plant concept, has been noted as "One of the most striking examples" of a multi genus reconstruction. Macginicarpa is the female reproductive head which was grown by same plant as the petrified wood Plataninium, leaf morphogenus Macginitiea, the male fruiting heads Platananthus and the isolated stamen clusters Macginistemon. Two "whole plant reconstructions" based on the fossil organs have been informally called the "Clarno Plane Tree", which includes Macginicarpa glabra, and the "Joffrea Plane Tree", which includes Macginicarpa manchesteri.

The "Clarno plane" encompasses a series of five different named morphotaxa covering leaves, fruits, stamins, and wood. The leaves have been placed into Macginitiea angustiloba and the petrified wood is named Plataninium haydenii. The reproductive organs of the tree are in Macginicarpa glabra for fruits, Platananthus synandrus for staminate heads, and Macginistemon mikanoides for isolated stamin clusters.

While not encompassing as many named organ taxa, the "Joffrea Plane" is named from a life stage series including seedlings. The named taxa include Macginitiea nobilis, Macginicarpa manchester, and Platananthus speirsae and has been identified from both Alberta and Montana sites.

== Paleoecology ==
The distribution of Macginicarpa fossils is noted to be across a higher latitude spread then is seen with the modern living genus Platanus, the last member of the family Platanaceae. Several scenarios have been suggested for the range differences based on either taphonomic bias or paleoclimate forcing. The taphonomy hypothesis is centered on the lack of low latitude riparian environments form which fossil preservation could happen, causing a gap in the true range. Conversely the paleoclimate hypothesis suggests that, like modern Platanus, the fossil trees were not adapted to tropical conditions, but the higher average global temperatures in the Paleocene through the end of the Eocene caused a northern shift in the habitable zone of platanaceous species as a whole.

== Extinction ==
Paleoclimate changes are one of the suggested reasons for the extinction of the Macginicarpa tree. The Oligocene is marked by clear downward trend in global temperatures, and this would have forced the trees to shift distribution ranges or caused extinction of populations when the climate changed beyond tolerance ranges. In contrast, Animal interchanges between Asia and North America happened during the Oligocene, and new faunal elements in the environment may have impacted the trees in adverse ways. The last option is that the trees lasted into or past the Oligocene, but a shift in the distribution of productive sites for fossil preservation south in the Oligocene may mean there is simply a lack of fossils showing its true paleotemporal span.
