= Ellen Dissanayake =

American anthropologist

Ellen Dissanayake (born Ellen Franzen), an American anthropologist and writer focusing on art and culture. She lives in Seattle, Washington, and is affiliated with the University of Washington.

== Biography ==
Dissanayake's birth name was Ellen Franzen; she was born in Illinois and raised in Walla Walla, Washington, where her father was an engineer and her mother a homemaker. She received a B.A. degree from Washington State University in 1957 (Humanities: Music and Philosophy) and an M.A. from the University of Maryland (Art History) in 1970. She married John Eisenberg in 1957 following graduation. Together they moved to Berkeley and then to Washington D.C. She has received an Honorary Doctorate of Humane Letters from the Maryland Institute College of Art (MICA), Baltimore, in 2013.

She cites "lived experience" abroad where she observed first-hand the cultural differences and attitudes toward art and culture amongst this variety of peoples as the inspiration for her work. She spent time in Sri Lanka, Nigeria, India, Madagascar, and Papua New Guinea.

She has taught at the New School for Social Research in New York City, the University of Edinburgh in Scotland, Sarah Lawrence College, the National Arts School in Papua New Guinea, and the University of Peradeniya in Sri Lanka. In 1997 she was a visiting professor at Ball State University in Indiana, and the following year taught at the University of Alberta in Edmonton, Alberta, Canada.

== Homo Aestheticus: Where Art Comes From and Why ==
In her book Homo Aestheticus: Where Art Comes From and Why (first printed in 1992), Dissanayake argues that art was central to the emergence, adaptation and survival of the human species, that aesthetic ability is innate in every human being, and that art is a need as fundamental to our species as food, warmth or shelter.

She views art as the product of "making things special", and these things may be objects as well as behaviors. That is to say, art evolved to make certain events, tentatively important for survival or social cohesion, more salient, pleasurable, and memorable. Artifacts of art are also said to result from efforts to deal with uncertainties of nature by exerting control over it.

It is claimed that art experiences are physically pleasurable, and distinctively so because one appreciates how the creators of art have shaped the raw materials. However, Dissanayake also contends that some of these raw materials may be pleasurable in themselves, i.e. "protoaesthetic" (p. 54), as may be the process of creation or some percepts in themselves without symbolic meaning, e.g. by means of obeying the Gestalt Principles. In general, the process of "making things special" is described as drawing on those aspects of the world that evolution had led us to find attractive: visual signs of health, youth and vitality, as well as a balance between uniformity and asymmetries.

The chapter The Arts as Means of Enhancement is a collection of cross-cultural evidence for instances that fall under Dissanayake's definition of art; a criticism of narrow European-centered notions of art in the 19th and 20th century. This criticism is developed further in the books' last chapter that advocates the necessity to promote art in education and everyday life, as it is said to be a universal, biologically rooted human behavior.

The book has been favorably reviewed by Denis Dutton in 1994 who states that it "calls for a counter-revolution in our thinking about art. Its message is timely, provocative, and immensely valuable.″

== Bibliography ==
=== Books ===
- Dissanayake, Ellen (1990). What is Art For? (Second ed.). University of Washington Press. ISBN 0295970170.
- Dissanayake, Ellen (1988). What is Art For? (First ed.). University of Washington Press.
- Dissanayake, Ellen (1995). Homo Aestheticus: Where Art Comes From and Why. University of Washington Press. ISBN 0295974796.
- Dissanayake, Ellen (1992). Homo Aestheticus: Where Art Comes From and Why (First ed.). Free Press. ISBN 978-0029078853.
- Art and Intimacy: How the Arts Began (2000)

=== Articles ===
- "Art as a human behavior: Toward an ethological view of art", Journal of Aesthetics and Art Criticism 38/4, 397–404. (1980)
- "Aesthetic experience and human evolution", Journal of Aesthetics and Art Criticism 41/2, 145–55. (1982)
- "Does art have selective value?" Empirical Studies of the Arts II, 1:35-49. (1984)
- "Art for life’s sake", Art Therapy: Journal of the American Art Therapy Association 9/4, 169–178. (1992)
- "Chimera, spandrel, or adaptation: Conceptualizing art in human evolution". Human Nature 6:2, 99–118. (1995)
- "The pleasure and meaning of making", American Craft 55,2: 40–45. (1995)
- "Reflecting on the past: Implications of prehistory and infancy for art therapy", ARTherapy 12, 1: 17–23. (1995)
- "Darwin meets literary theory: Critical discussion", Philosophy and Literature 20:1, 229- 239. (1996)
- "Komar and Melamid discover Pleistocene taste". Philosophy and Literature 22, 2: 486- 496. (1998)
- "The beginnings of artful form", Surface Design Journal 22:2, 4–5. (1998)
- "Aesthetic Incunabula", Philosophy and Literature 25:2, 335–346. (2001)
- "Art in Global Context: An Evolutionary/Functionalist Perspective for the 21st Century", International Journal of Anthropology 18:4, 245–258. (2003)
- "If music is the food of love, what about survival and reproductive success?", Musicae Scientiae, Special issue, 169–195. (2008)
- "The Artification Hypothesis and Its Relevance to Cognitive Science, Evolutionary Aesthetics, and Neuroaesthetics", Cognitive Semiotics 5:148-173. (2008)
- "The Deep Structure of Pleistocene Rock Art: The 'Artification Hypothesis'". Papers from IFRAO Congress, September 2010 – Symposium: Signs, symbols, myth, ideology... (Pre-Acts) http://www.ellendissanayake.com/publications/index.php#journals (2010)
- "Doing Without the Ideology of Art", New Literary History, 42: 71–79. (2011)
