= Fred Clarke (educationist) =

English educationist

Sir Fred Clarke
- By Elliott & Fry, 1943, (NPG)
- Born: 2 August 1880; High Cogges
- Died: 6 January 1952 (aged 71)
- Occupation: Educationist
- Board member of: Central Advisory Council for Education (England)
- Spouse: Edith Annie Gillams
- Children: Claudia Clarke, Anna Clarke
- Parent(s): Mr & Mrs William Clarke

Academic background
- Education: History & Qualified Teacher
- Alma mater: Oxford University St Catherine's College, Oxford
- Influences: The Moot

Academic work
- Discipline: Pedagogy
- Institutions: Institute of Education at the University of London
- Notable works: Education and Social Change: an English interpretation (1940)
- Notable ideas: (1) Teacher education, (2) Colonial Education, (3) Comparative education and, (4) The application of sociology to educational theory

Sir Frederick (Fred) Clarke (2 August 1880 – 6 January 1952) was an English educationist who was Director of the Institute of Education in the University of London between 1936 and 1945.

During the 1930s and 1940s, he was also a strong advocate for educational reform in England and Wales. Clarke was fully involved in the public educational debate at the time and a member of a private group of leading educational thinkers known as 'The Moot'. He is known particularly for his book Education and Social Change: an English interpretation from 1940. Other books include the collection of essays Essays in the Politics of Education (1923) and Freedom in the Educative Society (1948).

== Early life ==
Sir Fred Clarke was born on 2 August 1880 at High Cogges, Witney, Oxfordshire, his parents were Mr. & Mrs William Clarke. He moved with his family to Oxford where he attended St. Ebbe's Anglican Boys' School which was a monitorial school and where he was selected to be one of the pupil-teachers (1894-1899).

Sir Fred Clarke obtained a first-class in the Queen's Scholarship which entitled him to subsidised attendance at the Oxford University Day Training Teaching College at St. Catherine's Society for poor scholars who provisioned their own lodgings. In order to obtain a degree he also studied history in addition to his studies for a Teaching Certificate and hence graduated with a Bachelor of Arts with first-class honours for his four-year degree course (1899-1903).

== Personal life ==
Sir Fred Clark married Edith Annie Gilliams in 1907. He had two daughters: Anna Clarke and Claudia Clarke.

== Career ==
The major highlights of Fred Clarke's career as an educationist were: -

- Senior Master of Method at York Diocesan Training College, 1903-1906
- Professor of Education at Hartley University College, Southampton, 1906-1911
- Professor of Education at the University of Cape Town, South Africa, from 1911 to 1918
- Dean of Faculty of Education, at the University of Cape Town, South Africa, 1918-1929
- Professor of Education at McGill University, Montreal in Canada from 1929 to 1934
- World Tour of Western Canada, Australia and New Zealand sponsored by the Carnegie Corporation 1935
- Adviser to Overseas Students at the Institute of Education in the University of London 1935
- Third Director of the Institute of Education in the University of London between 1936 and 1945 when retired
- In retirement, reverted to being Adviser to Overseas Students at the Institute of Education in the University of London

== Public service ==
=== Committee evidence ===
Clarke contributed to the Spens Report (1938) with a memorandum on influences affecting secondary curricula in the dominions where he expounded his understanding based both on his time as professor of education in both Canada & South Africa, his world tour of 1935 and time advising overseas students. Clarke also gave evidence to the Norwood committee.

=== McNair committee ===
Prior to the Education Act of 1944 (known as the Butler Act), when the Board of Education was still in operation, Clarke served on the McNair committee under the chairmanship of Sir Arnold McNair to consider the supply, recruitment and training of teachers and youth leaders. Controversially, the committee split on the key recommendations regarding the ideal organisation for training teachers, whereby Clarke and half the committee supported Universities providing teacher training whereas the chair and the other half of the committee supported a continued role for teacher training colleges. Clarke's argument for universities hinged on the synergy between university research into pedagogy and the training of teachers so research was improved and teacher training was always abreast of the latest ideas. The counter argument for training colleges, especially those attached to schools was that training was more practical and hands-on.

=== Central advisory council for education (England) ===
After the Education Act 1944 brought the Ministry of Education into force, Fred Clarke was appointed as the first chairman of the Central Advisory Council for Education (England), where he played a role guiding post-war education policy for the new Ministry. During his tenure, two inquiries were carried out and with the resulting reports known as the Clarke Reports: -

1. School and Life (1947)
2. Out of School (1948)

The Clarke Report 1948 (Out of School) recommended an expansion of municipal facilities for children which most people today have enjoyed during their childhood, including: - libraries encouraging children by stocking children's books and later innovations like reading corners, playgrounds with equipment such as slides, swings and roundabouts, public swimming pools and sports playing fields.

=== Other public service roles ===
Clarke also undertook numerous advisory and committee roles with, for example the National Union of Teachers, the British Council and the establishment of the National Foundation for Educational Research.

== Bibliography ==
Following Sir Fred Clarke's death, his bibliography was written then published in 1967 by Frank W. Mitchell, it was titled; Sir Fred Clarke: Master-Teacher 1880-1952 (London: Longmans, 1967).

Fred Clarke's daughter Claudia Clarke effectively produced an 'early years' addendum to Mitchell's Bibliography in 2005 with the publication of Sir Fred Clarke: a Reappraisal of his early years 1880 - 1911. Claudia stated that Fred Clarke's widow, Edith Clarke restricted Mitchell's access to his private papers so there was little information on Fred Clarke's early years, the likely reason for this was to keep secret, a convict in the family who was transported to Australia. After Edith's death, Claudia gained access to the papers and published them in the Education Research and Perspectives, Vol. 33, No. 1, 2006.

Clarke's personal papers are now held at the Institute of Education Library and Archives, University College London

== Published works ==
=== Books ===
- 1909 - A School History of Hampshire
- 1923 - Essays in the Politics of Education
- 1929 - The foundations of history teaching, a critique for teachers
- 1940 - Education and Social Change: An English Interpretation
- 1948 - Freedom in the Educative Society

=== Journals ===
Sir Fred Clarke was a prolific writer of articles in educational journals, mainly aimed at professional readers on topics such as the training of teachers, the history of education, critiques of educational theories, and opinions on government policies towards education: -

The Educational News, Cape Town, South Africa

- 1911 - A Word on Training
- 1911 - School and Training College
- 1912 - The Evolution of Educational Theory
- 1912 - An Possit Praecepto Salvus Esse!
- 1912 - The History of Education - 'Cui Bono'!
- 1912 - Montessoriana
- 1913 - The Russell. Memorandum
- 1914 - From Locke to Montessori
- 1914 - The Syndicalist in Education (in 2 parts)
- 1915 - The 'History' Question
- 1915 - The School of Shakespeare's Day
- 1915 - Educational Outlook
- 1916 - Letter; "What is a Teacher?"
- 1916 - Letter; "Matriculation under the New University Scheme"
- 1916 - Education and Labour (in two parts)
- 1919 - Presidential Address (South African Teachers Association)
- 1919 - Training of Teachers -· Departments Proposals (in two parts)
- 1920 - The Salaries Commission
- 1920 - Professional Status of the Teacher
- 1920 - Presidential Address (South African Teachers Association)
- 1921 - Letter; "Greetings and Prophecies
- 1923 - Education and Society
- 1923 - Letter; Reply to Mr. Earle of Rhodes University, re. Teachers' Higher Diploma of the University of South Africa
- 1925 - The Imperial Mind (book review)
- 1925 - An Introduction to Psychology (book review)
- 1926 - Secondary School Courses
- 1926 - History in the Primary School (six articles)
- 1927 - Impressions of the Imperial Education Conference (in London)
- 1928 - The Question of Medium (plus a subsequent reply to criticism to this article)
- 1928 - Letter; "Conference and the Training of Teachers"
- 1928 - The Philosophical Bases of Education (book review)
- 1928 - Educational Psychology (book review)
- 1928 - Seen from the Threshold
- 1929 - Valedictory Letter to Conference (South African Teachers Association)

The Hibbert Journal; A Quarterly Review of Religion, Theology and Philosophy

- 1927 - An Elementary-Secondary School
- 1928 - English Mind and Dominion Mind
- 1929 - Education and the New English
- 1930 - Community; - An Estimate of the vital Principle of English Education
- 1932 - The Mature Significance of 'New' Countries

The Teachers' Magazine, Quebec, Montreal, P.Q.

- 1930 - Some First Impressions (Vol. XIII)
- 1930 - Notes on Education in the province of Quebec (Vol. XIII)
- 1930 - Training the High School Teacher: Developments and Possibilities in Quebec (Vol. XIII)
- 1932 - A Graduate Year of Training for High School Teachers (Vol. XIV)
- 1933 - Saving Democracy (Vol. XV)
- 1935 - Retrospect (Vol. XVII)
- 1936 - The State Master or Servant (Vol. XVIII)

The New Era

- 1927 - New Education in Africa
- 1931 - British Commonwealth - Disintegration or Mutual Understanding
- 1932 - The Key to To-morrow-I, The Reconstruction of Discipline
- 1934 - The New Countries in Education
- 1936 - The State: Master or Servant
- 1940 - Now and Tomorrow: Planned Freedom
- 1941 - A Note on the Exploratory Years
- 1942 - Cultural Aspects of Vocational Education

== Collections ==
University College London's Institute of Education (IOE) holds Clarke's archive, donated by his daughter Claudia. The collection includes documents relating to his work and career, personal material, and correspondence. The IOE also holds Clarke's set of the circulated discussion papers for 'The Moot', 1939-1942.
