= H. A. Hodges =

British philosopher and theologian

- Born: Herbert Arthur Hodges; 4 January 1905; Sheffield, England
- Died: 2 July 1976 (aged 71); Reading, England
- Occupations: Philosopher; theologian
- Spouse: Vera Joan Willis (m. 1939)
- Children: 3, including Wilfrid

Academic background
- Education: Oxford University

Herbert Arthur Hodges (4 January 1905 – 2 July 1976) was a British philosopher and theologian. He was Professor of Philosophy at Reading University from 1934 to 1969.

He was a member of The Moot, the discussion and study group begun by J. H. Oldham. Its purpose was "to continue, in an informal, confidential but serious way, exploration of the relation between church and society and the realisation of Christian ethics in the public sphere." Other members included T. S. Eliot, with whom Hodges corresponded. Eliot suggested to Karl Mannheim that Hodges was closer to Mannheim than others in the Moot, in at least some areas of thought.

Hodges represented the Church of England at the first assembly of the World Council of Churches in Amsterdam in Aug-Sept 1948.

Hodges published books on Wilhelm Dilthey, on Welsh hymnody and on Christianity.

== Bibliography ==
- "Symposium: Phenomenology" (with G. Ryle and H. B. Acton), "Proceedings of the Aristotelian Society, Supplementary Volumes, 1932, Vol. 11, Phenomenology, Goodness and Beauty (1932), pp. 68-115
- A critical examination of Dilthey's theory of the historical and social studies. PhD Thesis. [Great Britain] : University of Oxford, 1932.
- "The Meaning of Moral Re-Armament" Theology, May 1939, 322-32
- "A Study of Wilhelm Dilthey's Philosophy" Laudate XVII (1939) pp. 25–27; 80-99; 165-168; 218-223; XVIII pp. 25–45
- “What Difference Does Christianity Make?,” CN-L, 27 (1 May 1940)
- “Social Standards in a Mixed Society,” CN-L, 43 (21 Aug 1940)
- "Christianity in an Age of Science." in Oldham, J. H. Real Life is Meeting, With chapters by H. A. Hodges and Philip Mairet. London: Sheldon Press, 1942.
- Wilhelm Dilthey: An Introduction Kegan Paul, Trench, Trubner and Co. Ltd, 1944.
- "What's the Point of philosophy?" The Listener, 24 May 1945, p. 573/577.
- "A neglected page in Anglican theology", Theology: a monthly review. Vol. 48, no. 299, May 1945, 97-120
- The Christian in the Modern University London: S.C.M. Press, 1946
- Objectivity and Impartiality. London: S.C.M. Press, 1946
- Review of Natural Law: a Christian Reconsideration. Theology, 49, 194604, 122
- "Our Culture: Its Thought" in Our Culture: Its Christian Roots and Present Crisis, Edward Alleyn Lectures 1944, ed. V. A. Demant, London: Society for Promoting Christian Knowledge, 1947. Reprinted: Wipf and Stock Publishers, Eugene, 2018. See review by T. S. Eliot,
- Christianity and the Modern World View SCM Press, 1949. 2nd Edition SPCK, London, 1962
- The Way of Integration (London: Epworth Press, 1951)
- The Philosophy of Wilhelm Dilthey (London: Routledge & Kegan Paul, 1952)
- Introduction to Unseen Warfare. Being the Spiritual Combat and Path to Paradise of Lorenzo Scupoli as edited by Nicodemus of the Holy Mountain and revised by Theophan the Recluse. Translated into English from Theophan's Russian text by E. Kadloubovsky and G. E. H. Palmer. London : Faber & Faber, 1952.
- Languages Standpoints and Attitudes - Riddell Memorial Lectures, 24th Series (London: O.U.P., 1953)
- Review of The Essence of Philosophy. By Wilhelm Dilthey. Translated by Emery S. A. and Emery W. T.. University of North Carolina Press, 1954. Philosophy, 31, 195607, 263
- Anglicanism & Orthodoxy. A study in dialectical churchmanship. SCM Press, 1955
- Holiness, righteousness, perfection. A talk given at the Broadstairs Conference in September 1960. Fellowship of St. Alban and St. Sergius, London, [date of publication not identified]
- The Pattern of Atonement. London: SCM Press, 1955. 3rd impression 1963 [Based on a course of lectures given in Passion Week, 1953, at the Schola Cancellarii in Lincoln.]
- Death and Life Have Contended London: SCM Press, 1964
- A Rapture of praise. Hymns of John and Charles Wesley selected, arranged and introduced by H. A. Hodges and A. M. Allchin. London: Hodder & Stoughton, 1966.
- "Flame in the Mountains: Aspects of Welsh Free Church Hymnody", Religious Studies, Vol. 3, No. 1 (1967), pp. 401–413
- A Homage to Ann Griffiths Church in Wales Publications, Penarth, 1976
- The Logic of Religious Thinking (1979) (ed. W. D. Hudson)
- God beyond knowledge ed. W. D. Hudson, London : Macmillan, 1979.
- God be in my Thinking. Includes obituary of author by Stephen Parsons. Printed for V.J. Hodges by Orphans Press Ltd., Leominster, 1981
- Flame in the mountains : Williams Pantycelyn, Ann Griffiths and the Welsh hymn essays and translations by H.A. Hodges; edited by E. Wyn James. Talybont, Ceredigion: Y Lolfa, 2017.
