= Louis Arnaud Reid =

British philosopher (1895–1986)

- Born: 18 February 1895; Ellon, Aberdeenshire, Scotland
- Died: 26 January 1986 (aged 90); London, United Kingdom

Education
- Education: Edinburgh University

Philosophical work
- Era: 20th-century philosophy
- Region: Western philosophy
- School: Liberal
- Main interests: epistemology, aesthetics
- Notable ideas: embodied meaning

Louis Arnaud Reid (18 February 1895 - 26 January 1986) was a British philosopher who held the foundation chair in Philosophy of Education at the London University Institute of Education. He was a founding contributor to the British Journal of Aesthetics, and is best known for his writings on epistemology and aesthetics. He influenced figures as diverse as Susanne Langer and Lionel Trilling. Jacques Barzun said that Reid's book A Study in Aesthetics was "the best discussion of art yet produced in our century."

As A. J. Ayer recounts in his autobiography, Reid was the candidate preferred by the philosophers on the appointment committee for the chair in philosophy at the University of London. The philosophers were outvoted by the lay members of the committee, who appointed Ayer instead.

== Early life and education ==
Reid was born in the manse at Ellon, north of Aberdeen, the descendant of Presbyterian and later Free Church ministers. He later became an Anglican and later still an agnostic. He went to school at the Leys in Cambridge. He volunteered as a sapper in the Royal Engineers early in the First World War, though he was invalided out on the basis of rheumatic fever.

It was at about this period that he first read Bergson, and found his vocation in philosophy, going on to study at Edinburgh from which he graduated in 1919.

== Academic career ==
His first lectureship was at Aberystwyth, during which time he wrote the (realist) PhD which became his first book, under the supervision of the leading idealist, J.H. Muirhead. From Aberystwith he moved to Liverpool as a senior lecturer in 1926, and then in 1932 to a chair in philosophy at the Armstrong College, Newcastle, a college of Durham University.

In 1947 he was invited to move to the Institute in London, where he remained until his retirement in 1962. He continued to write and teach for many years afterwards.

== Theory of perception ==
In his first book, Knowledge and Truth, Reid argued against the representational theory of perception. This is the view implicit in Locke that when we see an object we in fact see an image (a representation) in our mind which is the product of the stimulation of our optic nerves by light. The problem with this account is that it makes the image the immediate object of perception, and thus leaves us with no direct evidence of the physical world. It leaves us vulnerable to Berkeley's idealism (the view that there is no physical world).

Reid (anticipating Mary Warnock) argued that the representational theory is faulty. When we see, he argued, we are not ‘seeing’ an image or sense datum in the mind: we are ‘seeing’ the world, albeit not in the direct fashion imagined by the naïve realist. The ‘seeing’ is in fact the act by which the image or datum is constructed in the first place. Imaging can thus be compared to the act by which a blind person constructs an ‘image’ of the external world on the basis of information transmitted through his or her white cane; for though our visual sense is much more sophisticated and appears immediate, it is in fact mediated by light (a physical intermediary like the cane), and involves the same kind of construction. ‘Imaging’ is thus an object-directed, mental act. (This is the basis of Reid's qualified realism.)

It follows that the sense datum is not what is known but is an active way of knowing the world. Moreover, the sense datum per se is an abstraction rather than a substantial entity, though sensing (conceived as an act) is very real. Sense qualities (qualia) are in a radical sense secondary qualities; not representations of the world, but instead presentations, or the way in which we understand the world.

== Epistemology and Embodied meaning ==
It follows that there is no problem in understanding how the qualitative aspects of art can embody meaning, given that qualia are paradigmatically mental, and interpretative. This solves one of the central puzzles about how art works. It is the basis for Reid's argument that art embodies meaning.

On this basis, Reid goes further, and makes the epistemological claim that the arts are a way of knowing. He rejects the common view of knowledge as paradigmatically propositional, regarding propositional meaning as something which the mind abstracts from concrete experience. What is in our propositions is first in our sensory or concrete understandings of the world, though that in turn (as a construction) is influenced by our conceptual understanding. Since art, as experienced, consists of qualia, and since qualia are paradigmatically mental and capable of embodying meaning, it follows that the arts are a way of knowing the world.

Reid's main work on epistemology is Ways of Knowledge and Experience published in 1961.

== Avoiding the Expressivist Fallacy ==
Reid's view of art as embodied meaning is designed to avoid what Vincent Tomas has called 'the expressivist fallacy', the view that there is a division between the thing which is 'expressed' ('pure' idea, feeling) and its expression (the tone of the violin). In A Study in Aesthetics (1931) Reid rejected Abercrombie's view that art is a translation of a prior conception or inspiration into (say) the verbal art of a poem, where the words are 'simply translations into external symbols'. For while the poet no doubt had feelings about the death of a particular person when it occurred, the poem embodies a later understanding of that death in a way that is thoroughly embodied. The artwork is thus a way of knowing the world. As Reid later said, 'we see through the medium, sometimes ... straight into life'.

== Phenomenology and Feeling ==
Reid's phenomenology also centred on the role of feeling in thinking, for he did not think of 'thinking' as some kind of computational manipulation of propositions. Instead, propositions codify our underlying feelings about the relations of things in the world. Feeling and thinking are two sides of the same coin.

By 'feeling' Reid is thus not referring to some kind of merely subjective quality. He regarded sensation as a paradigmatic kind of feeling, a kind of feeling which is cognitive and world directed. In this, he influenced Susanne Langer's views on feeling, and anticipated Antonio Damasio's somatic marker hypothesis as well the views of Nicholas Humphrey, George Lakoff and Mark Johnson, and others.

His views were largely developed independently of the Continental phenomenologists, whose works were not well known in Britain in the early inter-war period. He may have been unknowingly influenced by Coleridge, on whose philosophy his supervisor J.H. Muirhead wrote a seminal introduction.

== Reid and Anti-Psycholigism ==
It is worth noting that Reid's argument does not fall foul of the argument against psychologism, the argument put forward by Kant, Frege and Wittgenstein that images cannot be the basis of the meaning of words. For while Kant argued that 'No image could ever be adequate to the concept of a triangle in general [because] it would never attain that universality of the concept which renders it', Reid rejects the notion that images as such exist. Reid insists that 'in the end there are no images, but only imaging of real things'. Imaging, as described by Reid, has the kind of purchase on the 'objective' that Frege denied to merely psychological images, and to this extent avoids the argument against psychologism.

== Education ==
For Reid, education is not about the passive reproduction of propositional knowledge. It is about apprehension, about active and concrete understanding. He argued that the arts also have a central place in education, because they are a form of knowing.

== Collections ==
Reid's family donated his archive to the Institute of Education in 1986. The collection contains published material, unpublished papers and lectures with some correspondence, notes and working papers.

== Bibliography ==
For a by no means complete list of Reid's books and articles, see

- Knowledge and Truth. London: Macmillan, 1923.
- The Rediscovery of Belief. London: The Lindsey Press, 1930/1946.
- A Study in Aesthetics. London: Macmillan, 1931.
- Creative Morality. London, George Allen & Unwin, 1937.
- A Preface to Faith. London: George Allen & Unwin, 1939.
- Ways of Knowledge and Experience. London: George Allen and Unwin, 1961.
- Meaning in the Arts. London: George Allen and Unwin, 1969.
- Ways of Understanding and Education. London: Heinemann, 1986.
- Yesterdays Today: A Journey into Philosophy. Canberra: Samizdat Press (CreateSpace), 2013.
