= 2020 in paleobotany =

This article records new taxa of fossil plants described during the year 2020, as well as other significant discoveries and events related to paleobotany that occurred in 2020.

== Flowering plants ==
=== Alismatales ===
Name	Novelty	Status	Authors	Age	Type locality	Location	Notes	Images
Limnobiophyllum pedunculatum	Sp. nov	Valid	Low, Su & Xing in Low et al.	Late Oligocene		China	A member of the family Araceae.	

=== Apiales ===
Name	Novelty	Status	Authors	Age	Type locality	Location	Notes	Images
Paleopanax puryearensis	Sp. nov	Valid	Na, Blanchard & Wang	Middle Eocene	Cockfield Formation	United States (Tennessee)	A member of the family Araliaceae.	

=== Arecales ===
Name	Novelty	Status	Authors	Age	Type locality	Location	Notes	Images
Echimonocolpites chicxulubensis	Sp. nov	Valid	Smith et al.	Eocene (Ypresian)		Mexico	Pollen of a flowering plant, probably a member of the family Arecaceae.	
Palmoxylon ceroxyloides	Sp. nov	In press	Khan, Hazra & Bera in Khan et al.	Late Cretaceous (Maastrichtian)-Paleocene (Danian)	Deccan Intertrappean Beds	India	A petrified palm stem of a member of the subfamily Ceroxyloideae.	
Palmoxylon dindoriensis	Sp. nov	Valid	Khan, Roy & Bera in Khan et al.	Late Cretaceous (Maastrichtian)-Paleocene (Danian)	Deccan Intertrappean Beds	India	A petrified palm stem.	
Sabalites dawsonii	Sp. nov	Valid	Greenwood & Conran	Eocene		Canada (British Columbia)		
Sabalites karondiensis	Sp. nov	In press	Roy, Hazra & Khan in Roy et al.	Late Cretaceous-Paleocene (latest Maastrichtian-earliest Danian)	Deccan Intertrappean Beds	India	A palm frond .	
Spinizonocolpites riochiquensis	Sp. nov	Valid	Vallati & De Sosa Tomas in Vallati, De Sosa Tomas & Casal	Late Cretaceous (Maastrichtian)	Lago Colhué Huapí Formation	Argentina	A member of Arecaceae described on the basis of fossil pollen grains. Announced in 2019; the final version of the article naming it was published in 2020.	

=== Buxales ===
Name	Novelty	Status	Authors	Age	Type locality	Location	Notes	Images
Pachysandra europaea	Sp. nov	Valid	Kvaček, Teodoridis & Denk	Pliocene		Germany	A species of Pachysandra. Announced in 2019; the final version of the article naming it was published in 2020.	

=== Caryophyllales ===
Name	Novelty	Status	Authors	Age	Type locality	Location	Notes	Images
Gomphrenipollis garciae	Sp. nov	Valid	Rabelo Leite, Ferreira da Silva-Caminha & D'Apolito	Miocene	Solimões Basin	Brazil	Pollen of a flowering plant, possibly produced by members of the family Amaranthaceae. Announced in 2020; the final version of the article naming it was published in 2021.	

=== Chloranthales ===
Name	Novelty	Status	Authors	Age	Type locality	Location	Notes	Images
Sarcandraxylon	Gen. et sp. nov	Valid	Pipo, Iglesias & Bodnar	Late Cretaceous (early–middle Campanian)	Santa Marta Formation	Antarctica	A member of the family Chloranthaceae. Genus includes new species S. sanjosense.	

=== Cornales ===
Name	Novelty	Status	Authors	Age	Type locality	Location	Notes	Images
Amersinia littletonensis	Sp. nov	Valid	Huegele & Manchester	Early Paleocene	Denver Formation	United States (Colorado)		
Langtonia parva	Sp. nov	Valid	Huegele & Manchester	Early Paleocene	Denver Formation	United States (Colorado)	A member of the family Mastixiaceae.	
Mastixicarpum hoodii	Sp. nov	Valid	Huegele & Manchester	Early Paleocene	Denver Formation	United States (Colorado)	A member of the family Mastixiaceae.	
Nyssa gergoei	Sp. nov	Valid	Hably	Miocene		Hungary	A tupelo.	
Nyssa gyoergyi	Sp. nov	Valid	Hably	Miocene		Hungary	A tupelo.	
Platycrater iljinskajae	Sp. nov	In press	Denk et al.	Late Oligocene		Russia		
Portnallia alexanderi	Sp. nov	Valid	Huegele & Manchester	Early Paleocene	Denver Formation	United States (Colorado)	A member of the family Mastixiaceae.	

=== Crossosomatales ===
Name	Novelty	Status	Authors	Age	Type locality	Location	Notes	Images
Staphylea woodworthensis	Sp. nov	In press	Zhu & Manchester	Oligocene	Renova Formation	United States (Montana)	A species of Staphylea.	

=== Cucurbitales ===
Name	Novelty	Status	Authors	Age	Type locality	Location	Notes	Images
Coriaripites goodii	Sp. nov	Valid	Barreda, Palazzesi & Tellería in Renner et al.	Late Cretaceous (Campanian–early Maastrichtian)	López de Bertodano Formation; Santa Marta Formation; Snow Hill Island Formation	Antarctica	Pollen grains similar to those of extant members of the genus Coriaria.	
Echitriporites jolyi	Sp. nov	Valid	Rabelo Leite, Ferreira da Silva-Caminha & D'Apolito	Miocene	Solimões Basin	Brazil	Pollen produced by members of the genus Cayaponia. Announced in 2020; the final version of the article naming it was published in 2021.	

=== Ericales ===
Name	Novelty	Status	Authors	Age	Type locality	Location	Notes	Images
Andrewsiocarpon puryearensis	Sp. nov	Valid	Na, Blanchard & Wang	Middle Eocene	Cockfield Formation	United States (Tennessee)	A member of the family Theaceae.	
Anubiscarpon	Gen. et sp. nov	Valid	Smith & Manchester	Middle Eocene	Clarno Formation	United States (Oregon)	A member of the family Theaceae. Genus includes new species A. andersonae.	

=== Fabales ===
Name	Novelty	Status	Authors	Age	Type locality	Location	Notes	Images
Cercis zekuensis	Sp. nov	Valid	Li et al.	Early Miocene		China	A species of Cercis. Announced in 2020; the final version of the article naming it was published in 2021.	
Gleditsia pliocaenica	Sp. nov	Valid	Kvaček, Teodoridis & Denk	Pliocene		Germany	A species of Gleditsia. Announced in 2019; the final version of the article naming it was published in 2020.	
Menendoxylon lutzi	Sp. nov	In press	Baez & Crisafulli	Miocene	Chiquimil	Argentina	Fossil wood of a member of the family Fabaceae.	
Parkiidites marileae	Sp. nov	Valid	Rabelo Leite, Ferreira da Silva-Caminha & D'Apolito	Miocene	Solimões Basin	Brazil	Pollen produced by members of the genus Parkia. Announced in 2020; the final version of the article naming it was published in 2021.	
Prioria martineziorum	Sp. nov	Valid	Rodríguez-Reyes & Estrada-Ruiz	Oligocene-Miocene	Santiago Formation	Panama	A species of Prioria.	
Psilastephanocolporites deoliverae	Sp. nov	Valid	Rabelo Leite, Ferreira da Silva-Caminha & D'Apolito	Miocene	Solimões Basin	Brazil	Pollen produced by members of the family Polygalaceae. Announced in 2020; the final version of the article naming it was published in 2021.	
Psilastephanocolporites endoporatus	Sp. nov	Valid	Rabelo Leite, Ferreira da Silva-Caminha & D'Apolito	Miocene	Solimões Basin	Brazil	Announced in 2020; the final version of the article naming it was published in 2021.	
Striatopollis grahamii	Sp. nov	Valid	Smith et al.	Eocene (Ypresian)		Mexico	Pollen of an eudicot, probably a member of the family Fabaceae.	

=== Fagales ===
Name	Novelty	Status	Authors	Age	Type locality	Location	Notes	Images
Alnus chaybulakensis	Sp. nov	Valid	Averyanova & Xing	Paleogene		Kazakhstan	An alder.	
Berryophyllum hainanensis	Sp. nov	Valid	Liu & Jin in Liu, Song & Jin	Eocene	Changchang Formation	China	A member of the family Fagaceae.	
Carpinus asymmetrica	Sp. nov	In press	Xue & Jia in Xue et al.	Early Miocene	Maguan	China	A species of Carpinus.	
Carpinus symmetrica	Sp. nov	In press	Xue & Jia in Xue et al.	Early Miocene	Maguan Basin	China	A species of Carpinus	
Carya pipecreekensis	Sp. nov	In press	Swinehart & Farlow	Late Neogene	Pipe Creek Sinkhole	United States (Indiana)	A hickory.	
Castaneophyllum hainanensis	Sp. nov	Valid	Liu & Jin in Liu, Song & Jin	Eocene	Changchang Formation	China	A member of the family Fagaceae.	
Castaneophyllum lanceolata	Sp. nov	Valid	Liu & Jin in Liu, Song & Jin	Eocene	Changchang Formation	China	A member of the family Fagaceae.	
Castanopsis bulgarica	Sp. nov	Valid	Mantzouka, Ivanov & Bozukov	Late Miocene–early Pliocene (late Messinian–early Zanclean)	Pokrovnik	Bulgaria	A species of Castanopsis. Announced in 2020; the final version of the article naming it was published in 2021.	
Lithocarpus changchangensis	Sp. nov	Valid	Liu & Jin in Liu, Song & Jin	Eocene	Changchang Formation	China	A species of Lithocarpus.	
Quercus aimeeana	Sp. nov	Valid	Sadowski, Schmidt & Denk	Eocene	Baltic amber	Europe (Baltic Sea region)	An oak.	
Quercus borissovii	Sp. nov	Valid	Averyanova & Xing	Paleogene		Kazakhstan	An oak.	
Quercus campanulata	Sp. nov	Valid	Sadowski, Schmidt & Denk	Eocene	Baltic amber	Europe (Baltic Sea region)	An oak.	
Quercus casparyi	Sp. nov	Valid	Sadowski, Schmidt & Denk	Eocene	Baltic amber	Europe (Baltic Sea region)	An oak.	
Quercus changchangensis	Sp. nov	Valid	Liu & Jin in Liu, Song & Jin	Eocene	Changchang Formation	China	An oak.	
Quercus conwentzii	Sp. nov	Valid	Sadowski, Schmidt & Denk	Eocene	Baltic amber	Europe (Baltic Sea region)	An oak.	
Quercus longianthera	Sp. nov	Valid	Sadowski, Schmidt & Denk	Eocene	Baltic amber	Europe (Baltic Sea region)	An oak.	
Quercus multipilosa	Sp. nov	Valid	Sadowski, Schmidt & Denk	Eocene	Baltic amber	Europe (Baltic Sea region)	An oak.	
Quercus paleoargyrotricha	Sp. nov	Valid	Liu & Jin in Liu, Song & Jin	Eocene	Changchang Formation	China	An oak.	
Quercus paleohypargyrea	Sp. nov	Valid	Liu & Jin in Liu, Song & Jin	Eocene	Changchang Formation	China	An oak.	
Quercus paleolamellosa	Sp. nov	Valid	Liu & Jin in Liu, Song & Jin	Eocene	Changchang Formation	China	An oak.	

=== Garryales ===
Name	Novelty	Status	Authors	Age	Type locality	Location	Notes	Images
Eucommia szaferi	Sp. nov	Valid	Kvaček, Teodoridis & Denk	Pliocene		Germany	A species of Eucommia. Announced in 2019; the final version of the article naming it was published in 2020.	

=== Gentianales ===
Name	Novelty	Status	Authors	Age	Type locality	Location	Notes	Images
Asclepiadospermum	Gen. et 2 sp. nov	Valid	Del Rio et al.	Early Eocene	Niubao Formation	China	An asclepiadoid Apocynaceae genus. Included species A. marginatum and A. ellipticum.	
Margocolporites carinae	Sp. nov	Valid	Rabelo Leite, Ferreira da Silva-Caminha & D'Apolito	Miocene	Solimões Basin	Brazil	Pollen produced by members of the genus Rauvolfia. Announced in 2020; the final version of the article naming it was published in 2021.	

=== Icacinales ===
Name	Novelty	Status	Authors	Age	Type locality	Location	Notes	Images
Iodes elliptica	Sp. nov	In press	Del Rio et al.	Early Oligocene	Wenshan Basin	China	A member of the family Icacinaceae.	
Iodes passiciensis	Sp. nov	Valid	Del Rio & De Franceschi	Early Eocene		France	A member of the family Icacinaceae.	
Manchesteria	Gen. et sp. nov	In press	Stull & Rozefelds in Rozefelds et al.	Cenozoic (mid-Miocene or, more likely, middle Eocene)		Australia	A member of the family Icacinaceae. Genus includes new species M. australis.	
Pyrenacantha simonsii	Sp. nov	Valid	Stull et al.	Early Oligocene		Egypt	A species of Pyrenacantha.	

=== Lamiales ===
Name	Novelty	Status	Authors	Age	Type locality	Location	Notes	Images
Echitricolpites cruziae	Sp. nov	Valid	Rabelo Leite, Ferreira da Silva-Caminha & D'Apolito	Miocene	Solimões Basin	Brazil	Pollen produced by members of the genus Aegiphila. Announced in 2020; the final version of the article naming it was published in 2021.	
Multiareolites? reticulatus	Sp. nov	Valid	Rabelo Leite, Ferreira da Silva-Caminha & D'Apolito	Miocene	Solimões Basin	Brazil	Pollen produced by members of the family Acanthaceae. Announced in 2020; the final version of the article naming it was published in 2021.	
Retistephanocolpites curvimuratus	Sp. nov	Valid	Rabelo Leite, Ferreira da Silva-Caminha & D'Apolito	Miocene	Solimões Basin	Brazil	Announced in 2020; the final version of the article naming it was published in 2021.	
Retistephanocolpites pardoi	Sp. nov	Valid	Rabelo Leite, Ferreira da Silva-Caminha & D'Apolito	Miocene	Solimões Basin	Brazil	Pollen of a flowering plant, possibly produced by members of the genus Amphilophium. Announced in 2020; the final version of the article naming it was published in 2021.	

=== Laurales ===
Name	Novelty	Status	Authors	Age	Type locality	Location	Notes	Images
Actinodaphnoxylon	Gen. et sp. nov	In press	Akkemik et al.	Eocene (Lutetian)		Turkey	A member of the family Lauraceae. Genus includes new species A. zileensis.	
Mezilaurinoxylon oleiferum	Sp. nov	Valid	Ruiz, Brea & Pujana in Ruiz et al.	Paleocene (Danian)	Salamanca Formation	Argentina	A member of the family Lauraceae. Announced in 2019; the final version of the article naming it is scheduled to be published in 2020.	
Patagonoxylon	Gen. et sp. nov	Valid	Ruiz, Brea & Pujana in Ruiz et al.	Paleocene (Danian)	Salamanca Formation	Argentina	A member of Laurales of uncertain phylogenetic placement. Genus includes new species P. scalariforme. Announced in 2019; the final version of the article naming it is scheduled to be published in 2020.	
Thymolepis	Gen. et sp. nov	Valid	Chambers & Poinar	Late Cretaceous (Cenomanian)	Burmese amber	Myanmar	Possibly an early representative of Monimiaceae. Genus includes new species T. toxandra.	
Valviloculus	Gen. et sp. nov	Valid	Poinar et al.	Late Cretaceous (Cenomanian)	Burmese amber	Myanmar	Possibly a member of Laurales related to the families Monimiaceae and Atherospermataceae. Genus includes new species V. pleristaminis.	

=== Liliales ===
Name	Novelty	Status	Authors	Age	Type locality	Location	Notes	Images
Smilax fujianensis	Sp. nov	Valid	Dong et al.	Middle Miocene		China	A species of Smilax. Announced in 2020; the final version of the article naming it was published in 2021.	
Smilax zhangpuensis	Sp. nov	Valid	Dong et al.	Middle Miocene		China	A species of Smilax. Announced in 2020; the final version of the article naming it was published in 2021.	

=== Magnoliales ===
Name	Novelty	Status	Authors	Age	Type locality	Location	Notes	Images
Magnolia nanningensis	Sp. nov	Valid	Huang et al.	Late Oligocene	Nanning Basin	China	A species of Magnolia.	
Magnolia waltheri	Sp. nov	Valid	Kvaček, Teodoridis & Denk	Pliocene		Germany	A species of Magnolia. Announced in 2019; the final version of the article naming it was published in 2020.	
Melloniflora	Gen. et sp. nov	Valid	Friis, Crane & Pedersen	Early Cretaceous	Potomac Group	United States (Virginia)	A relative of extant early-diverging members of the Magnoliales. Genus includes new species M. virginiensis.	

=== Malpighiales ===
Name	Novelty	Status	Authors	Age	Type locality	Location	Notes	Images
Salix palaeofutura	Sp. nov	Valid	Narita et al.	Miocene	Bifuka Formation	Japan	A willow.	

=== Malvales ===
Name	Novelty	Status	Authors	Age	Type locality	Location	Notes	Images
Bastardioxylon	Gen. et sp. nov	In press	Baez & Crisafulli	Miocene	Chiquimil	Argentina	Fossil wood of a member of the family Malvaceae. Genus includes new species B. antiqua.	
Dipterocarpus dindoriensis	Sp. nov	Valid	Khan, Spicer & Bera in Khan et al.	Late Cretaceous (Maastrichtian)	Deccan Intertrappean Beds	India	A species of Dipterocarpus.	
Echiperiporites germeraadii	Sp. nov	Valid	Rabelo Leite, Ferreira da Silva-Caminha & D'Apolito	Miocene	Solimões Basin	Brazil	Announced in 2020; the final version of the article naming it was published in 2021.	
Echiperiporites jaramilloi	Sp. nov	Valid	Rabelo Leite, Ferreira da Silva-Caminha & D'Apolito	Miocene	Solimões Basin	Brazil	Pollen produced by members of the genus Hibiscus. Announced in 2020; the final version of the article naming it was published in 2021.	
Echiperiporites titanicus	Sp. nov	Valid	Rabelo Leite, Ferreira da Silva-Caminha & D'Apolito	Miocene	Solimões Basin	Brazil	Pollen produced by members of the genus Malachra. Announced in 2020; the final version of the article naming it was published in 2021.	
Retistephanocolporites elizabeteae	Sp. nov	Valid	Rabelo Leite, Ferreira da Silva-Caminha & D'Apolito	Miocene	Solimões Basin	Brazil	Pollen produced by members of the genus Ceiba. Announced in 2020; the final version of the article naming it was published in 2021.	
Veraguasoxylon	Gen. et sp. nov	Valid	Rodríguez-Reyes & Estrada-Ruiz	Oligocene-Miocene	Santiago Formation	Panama	A member of the family Malvaceae. Genus includes new species V. panamense.	

=== Myrtales ===
Name	Novelty	Status	Authors	Age	Type locality	Location	Notes	Images
Eucalyptus xoshemium	Sp. nov	Valid	Gandolfo & Zamaloa in Zamaloa, Gandolfo & Nixon	Eocene (Ypresian)	Huitrera Formation	Argentina	A species of Eucalyptus.	
Mangroveoxylon	Gen. et comb. nov	In press	Moya & Brea	Late Miocene?	Ituzaingó Formation	Argentina	A member of the family Combretaceae; a new genus for "Menendoxylon" areniensis Lutz (1979).	
Myrceugenellites grandiporosum	Sp. nov	Valid	Ruiz, Brea & Pujana in Ruiz et al.	Paleocene (Danian)	Salamanca Formation	Argentina	A member of the family Myrtaceae. Announced in 2019; the final version of the article naming it is scheduled to be published in 2020.	
Primotrapa	Gen. et sp. nov	Valid	Li & Li in Li et al.	Late Eocene to early Miocene	Hannuoba	China; Czech Republic; France; Germany	A member of Trapoideae. Genus includes new species P. weichangensis, as well as "Carpolithus" pomelii Saporta (1878) and "Hemitrapa" alpina Su & Zhou in Su et al. (2018).	

=== Nymphaeales ===
Name	Novelty	Status	Authors	Age	Type locality	Location	Notes	Images
Praenymphaeapollenites	Gen. et sp. nov	Valid	Barrón, Peris & Labandeira in Peris et al.	Cenomanian	Burmese amber	Myanmar	Pollen of a member of Nymphaeaceae. Genus includes new species P. cenomaniensis.	

=== Oxalidales ===
Name	Novelty	Status	Authors	Age	Type locality	Location	Notes	Images
Cunoniantha	Gen. et sp. nov	Valid	Jud & Gandolfo	Paleocene (early Danian)	Salamanca Formation	Argentina	A member of the family Cunoniaceae. Genus includes new species C. bicarpellata. Announced in 2020; the final version of the article naming it was published in 2021.	
Elaeocarpus nanningensis	Sp. nov	In press	Liu et al.	Late Oligocene	Yongning Formation	China	A species of Elaeocarpus.	
Elaeocarpus prelacunosus	Sp. nov	In press	Liu et al.	Late Miocene	Foluo Formation	China	A species of Elaeocarpus.	
Elaeocarpus preprunifolioides	Sp. nov	In press	Liu et al.	Late Miocene	Foluo Formation	China	A species of Elaeocarpus.	
Elaeocarpus prerugosus	Sp. nov	In press	Liu et al.	Late Miocene	Foluo Formation	China	A species of Elaeocarpus.	
Elaeocarpus preserratus	Sp. nov	In press	Liu et al.	Late Miocene	Foluo Formation	China	A species of Elaeocarpus.	
Elaeocarpus presikkimensis	Sp. nov	In press	Liu et al.	Miocene	Erzitang Formation	China	A species of Elaeocarpus.	

=== Poales ===
Name	Novelty	Status	Authors	Age	Type locality	Location	Notes	Images
Monoporopollenites scabratus	Sp. nov	Valid	Rabelo Leite, Ferreira da Silva-Caminha & D'Apolito	Miocene	Solimões Basin	Brazil	Pollen produced by members of the family Poaceae. Announced in 2020; the final version of the article naming it was published in 2021.	
Rhizomatites	Gen. et sp. nov	In press	Robledo & Anzótegui in Robledo et al.	Miocene-Pliocene		Argentina	A member of Cyperaceae. Genus includes new species R. cyperoides.	

=== Proteales ===
Name	Novelty	Status	Authors	Age	Type locality	Location	Notes	Images
Banksia microphylla	Sp. nov	Valid	Carpenter in Carpenter & Milne	Late Eocene		Australia	A species of Banksia.	
Banksieaeidites zanthus	Sp. nov	Valid	Milne in Carpenter & Milne	Late Eocene		Australia	A Banksia-like pollen.	
Platanus emryi	Sp. nov	Valid	Huegele, Spielbauer & Manchester	Miocene		United States	A species of Platanus.	

=== Ranunculales ===
Name	Novelty	Status	Authors	Age	Type locality	Location	Notes	Images
Cissampelos defranceschii	Sp. nov	Valid	Del Rio & Su in Del Rio et al.	Middle Eocene	Niubao Formation	China	A species of Cissampelos. Announced in 2020; the final version of the article naming it was published in 2021.	
Clematis csabae	Sp. nov	Valid	Hably	Miocene		Hungary	A species of Clematis.	
Diploclisia praeaffinis	Sp. nov	Valid	Jia et al.	Late Miocene		China	A member of the family Menispermaceae. Announced in 2020; the final version of the article naming it was published in 2021.	
Menispermites bangorensis	Sp. nov	Valid	Huang in Del Rio et al.	Middle Eocene	Niubao Formation	China	A member of the family Menispermaceae. Announced in 2020; the final version of the article naming it was published in 2021.	
Menispermites haominae	Sp. nov	Valid	Huang in Del Rio et al.	Middle Eocene	Niubao Formation	China	A member of the family Menispermaceae. Announced in 2020; the final version of the article naming it was published in 2021.	
Menispermites tibetica	Sp. nov	Valid	Huang in Del Rio et al.	Middle Eocene	Niubao Formation	China	A member of the family Menispermaceae. Announced in 2020; the final version of the article naming it was published in 2021.	
Paleoorbicarpum	Gen. et sp. nov	Valid	Han et al.	Paleocene	Sanshui Basin	China	A member of the family Menispermaceae. Genus includes new species P. parvum.	
Stephania bangorensis	Sp. nov	Valid	Del Rio & Su in Del Rio et al.	Middle Eocene	Niubao Formation	China	A species of Stephania. Announced in 2020; the final version of the article naming it was published in 2021.	
Stephania geniculata	Sp. nov	Valid	Han et al.	Paleocene	Sanshui Basin	China	A species of Stephania	
Stephania ornamenta	Sp. nov	Valid	Han et al.	Paleocene	Sanshui Basin	China	A species of Stephania	
Stephania shuangxingii	Sp. nov	Valid	Del Rio & Su in Del Rio et al.	Middle Eocene	Niubao Formation	China	A species of Stephania. Announced in 2020; the final version of the article naming it was published in 2021.	

=== Rosales ===
Name	Novelty	Status	Authors	Age	Type locality	Location	Notes	Images
Berhamniphyllum junrongii	Sp. nov	Valid	Zhou, Wang & Huang in Zhou et al.	Late Eocene	Markam Basin	China	A member of the family Rhamnaceae	
Crataegus pentagynoides	Sp. nov	Valid	Kvaček, Teodoridis & Denk	Pliocene		Germany	A species of Crataegus. Announced in 2019; the final version of the article naming it was published in 2020.	
Hemiptelea kryshtofovichii	Sp. nov	Valid	Averyanova & Xing	Paleogene		Kazakhstan	A member of the family Ulmaceae.	
Scabrastephanoporites	Gen. et sp. nov	Valid	Smith et al.	Eocene (Ypresian)		Mexico	Pollen of an eudicot, probably a member of the family Ulmaceae or Cannabaceae. Genus includes new species S. variabilis.	

=== Sapindales ===
Name	Novelty	Status	Authors	Age	Type locality	Location	Notes	Images
Acer dombeyopsis	Sp. nov	Valid	Kvaček, Teodoridis & Denk	Pliocene		Germany	A maple. Announced in 2019; the final version of the article naming it was published in 2020.	
Acer viburnoides	Sp. nov	Valid	Kvaček, Teodoridis & Denk	Pliocene		Germany	A maple. Announced in 2019; the final version of the article naming it was published in 2020.	
Acer vitiforme	Sp. nov	Valid	Kvaček, Teodoridis & Denk	Pliocene		Germany	A maple. Announced in 2019; the final version of the article naming it was published in 2020.	
Brosipollis reticulatus	Sp. nov	Valid	Smith et al.	Eocene (Ypresian)		Mexico	Pollen of a flowering plant, probably a member of the family Burseraceae.	
Choerospondias fujianensis	Sp. nov	In press	Wang et al.	Miocene		China	A species of Choerospondias.	
Llanodelacruzoxylon	Gen. et sp. nov		Rodríguez-Reyes, Estrada-Ruiz & Gasson	Oligocene–Miocene	Santiago Formation	Panama	A member of the family Anacardiaceae. Genus includes new species L. sandovalii.	
Manchestercarpa	Gen. et sp. nov	Valid	Atkinson	Late Cretaceous (Campanian)		Canada (British Columbia)	A member of the family Meliaceae described on the basis of a fossil fruit. Genus includes new species M. vancouverensis.	
Parametopioxylon	Gen. et sp. nov	Valid	Franco et al.	Miocene	Ituzaingó Formation	Argentina	A member of the family Anacardiaceae described on the basis of fossil wood. Genus includes new species P. crystalliferum.	
Psilastephanocolporites hammenii	Sp. nov	Valid	Smith et al.	Eocene (Ypresian)		Mexico	Pollen of a flowering plant, probably a member of the family Meliaceae	
Quinquala	Gen. et sp. nov	Valid	Manchester & Disney in Manchester, Disney & Pham	Eocene	Clarno Formation; Tepee Trail Formation	United States (Oregon; Wyoming)	A fossil fruit with affinities with the Rutaceae. Genus includes new species Q. obovata.	
Rousea cavitata	Sp. nov	Valid	Rabelo Leite, Ferreira da Silva-Caminha & D'Apolito	Miocene	Solimões Basin	Brazil	Announced in 2020; the final version of the article naming it was published in 2021.	

=== Saxifragales ===
Name	Novelty	Status	Authors	Age	Type locality	Location	Notes	Images
Corylopsis grisea	Sp. nov	Valid	Quirk & Hermsen	Early Pliocene	Gray Fossil Site	United States (Tennessee)	A species of Corylopsis. Announced in 2020; the final version of the article naming it was published in 2021.	
Itea polyneura	Sp. nov	In press	Huang & Tian in Tian et al.	Oligocene	Huazhige Formation	China	A species of Itea.	
Protoaltingia	Gen. et sp. nov	Valid	Scharfstein, Stockey & Rothwell	Late Cretaceous (Coniacian)		Canada (British Columbia)	A member of the family Altingiaceae. Genus includes new species P. comoxense.	

=== Solanales ===
Name	Novelty	Status	Authors	Age	Type locality	Location	Notes	Images
Physalis hunickenii	Sp. nov	Valid	Deanna, Wilf & Gandolfo	Early Eocene	Laguna del Hunco Formation	Argentina	A species of Physalis.	

=== Trochodendrales ===
Name	Novelty	Status	Authors	Age	Type locality	Location	Notes	Images
Eotrochion	Gen. et sp. nov	Valid	Manchester, Kvaček & Judd	Paleocene		United States (Wyoming)	A member of the family Trochodendraceae. Genus includes new species E. polystylum. Announced in 2020; the final version of the article naming it was published in 2021.	
Paraconcavistylon	Gen. et comb. nov	Valid	Manchester, Kvaček & Judd	Ypresian	Klondike Mountain Formation	United States (Washington)	A Trochodendraceae; a new genus for "Concavistylon" wehrii Manchester et al. (2018). Announced in 2020; the final version of the article naming it was published in 2021.	
Trochodendron infernense	Sp. nov	Valid	Manchester, Kvaček & Judd	Paleocene		United States (Wyoming)	A species of Trochodendron. Announced in 2020; the final version of the article naming it was published in 2021.	

=== Vitales ===
Name	Novelty	Status	Authors	Age	Type locality	Location	Notes	Images
Yua jiangxiensis	Sp. nov	Valid	He & Wang	Miocene	Toupi Formation	China	A species of Yua. Announced in 2020; the final version of the article naming it was published in 2021.	

=== Other angiosperms ===
Name	Novelty	Status	Authors	Age	Type locality	Location	Notes	Images
Aextoxicoxylon kawasianus	Sp. nov	Valid	Vera et al.	Late Cretaceous	Puntudo Chico Formation	Argentina	A fossil dicot wood	
Atlantocarpus	Gen. et sp. nov	Valid	Friis, Crane & Pedersen	Early Cretaceous (Albian)	Potomac Group	Portugal; United States (Virginia)	An early flowering plant, possibly related to the group Austrobaileyales. Genus includes new species A. virginiensis.	
Carpolithes gergoei	Sp. nov	Valid	Hably & Erdei in Hably	Miocene		Hungary	A fossil fruit of a flowering plant of uncertain phylogenetic placement.	
Catanthus	Gen. et sp. nov	In press	Friis, Crane & Pedersen	Early Cretaceous		Portugal	An early flowering plant. Genus includes new species C. dolichostemon.	
Cavilignum	Gen. et sp. nov	Valid	Siegert & Hermsen	Early Pliocene	Gray Fossil Site	United States (Tennessee)	A flowering plant of uncertain phylogenetic placement, described on the basis of fossil endocarps. Genus includes new species C. pratchettii.	
Chainandra	Gen. et sp. nov	Valid	Poinar & Chambers	Late Cretaceous (Cenomanian)	Burmese amber	Myanmar	Genus includes new species C. zeugostylus.	
Cichoreacidites? flammulatus	Sp. nov	Valid	Rabelo Leite, Ferreira da Silva-Caminha & D'Apolito	Miocene	Solimões Basin	Brazil	Pollen of a flowering plant. Announced in 2020; the final version of the article naming it was published in 2021.	
Crotonoidaepollenites echinatus	Sp. nov	Valid	Rabelo Leite, Ferreira da Silva-Caminha & D'Apolito	Miocene	Solimões Basin	Brazil	Pollen of a flowering plant. Announced in 2020; the final version of the article naming it was published in 2021.	
Cyathitepala	Gen. et sp. nov	Valid	Poinar & Chambers	Late Cretaceous (Cenomanian)	Burmese amber	Myanmar	Genus includes new species C. papillosa.	
Dasykothon	Gen. et sp. nov	Valid	Poinar & Chambers	Late Cretaceous (Cenomanian)	Burmese amber	Myanmar	A flowering plant of uncertain phylogenetic placement, possibly a member of Laurales. Genus includes new species D. leptomiscus.	
Dinganthus	Gen. et sp. nov	Valid	Liu et al.	Miocene	Dominican amber	Dominican Republic	A eudicot of uncertain phylogenetic placement. Genus includes new species D. pentamera.	
Echistephanoporites annulatus	Sp. nov	Valid	Rabelo Leite, Ferreira da Silva-Caminha & D'Apolito	Miocene	Solimões Basin	Brazil	Pollen of a flowering plant. Announced in 2020; the final version of the article naming it was published in 2021.	
Eofructus	Gen. et sp. nov	Valid	Han & Wang	Early Cretaceous	Yixian Formation	China	An infructescence including a central axis and five fruits resembling Liaoningfructus. Genus includes new species E. liutiaogouensis.	
Foveotricolporites crassus	Sp. nov	Valid	Rabelo Leite, Ferreira da Silva-Caminha & D'Apolito	Miocene	Solimões Basin	Brazil	Pollen of a flowering plant. Announced in 2020; the final version of the article naming it was published in 2021.	
Inaperturopollenites microechinatus	Sp. nov	Valid	Rabelo Leite, Ferreira da Silva-Caminha & D'Apolito	Miocene	Solimões Basin	Brazil	Pollen of a flowering plant. Announced in 2020; the final version of the article naming it was published in 2021.	
Ladakhipollenites carmoi	Sp. nov	Valid	Rabelo Leite, Ferreira da Silva-Caminha & D'Apolito	Miocene	Solimões Basin	Brazil	Pollen of a flowering plant. Announced in 2020; the final version of the article naming it was published in 2021.	
Lambertiflora	Gen. et sp. nov	Valid	Friis, Crane & Pedersen	Early Cretaceous (Albian)	Potomac Group	United States (Virginia)	An early flowering plant, possibly related to the group Austrobaileyales. Genus includes new species L. elegans.	
Malvacipolloides diversus	Sp. nov	Valid	Rabelo Leite, Ferreira da Silva-Caminha & D'Apolito	Miocene	Solimões Basin	Brazil	Pollen of a flowering plant. Announced in 2020; the final version of the article naming it was published in 2021.	
Malvacipolloides echibaculatus	Sp. nov	Valid	Rabelo Leite, Ferreira da Silva-Caminha & D'Apolito	Miocene	Solimões Basin	Brazil	Pollen of a flowering plant. Announced in 2020; the final version of the article naming it was published in 2021.	
Malvacipolloides romeroae	Sp. nov	Valid	Rabelo Leite, Ferreira da Silva-Caminha & D'Apolito	Miocene	Solimões Basin	Brazil	Pollen of a flowering plant. Announced in 2020; the final version of the article naming it was published in 2021.	
Menatanthus	Gen. et sp. nov	Valid	Uhl, Paudayal & El Atfy in Uhl et al.	Paleocene (Thanetian)		France	A eudicot of uncertain phylogenetic placement. Genus includes new species M mosbruggeri. Announced in 2020; the final version of the article naming it was published in 2021.	
Mugideiriflora	Gen. et sp. nov	Valid	Friis, Crane & Pedersen	Early Cretaceous (Aptian-early Albian)	Almargem Formation	Portugal	An early flowering plant, possibly related to the group Austrobaileyales. Genus includes new species M. portugallica.	
Phantophlebia	Gen. et sp. nov	Valid	Poinar & Chambers	Late Cretaceous (Cenomanian)	Burmese amber	Myanmar	A flowering plant of uncertain phylogenetic placement, possibly related to myrsinoid members of the family Primulaceae. Genus includes new species P. dicycla.	
Platanites willigeri	Sp. nov	Valid	Halamski & Kvaček in Halamski et al.	Late Cretaceous (Santonian)	Czerna Formation	Poland	Trifoliolate platanoid leaves.	
Psilaperiporites delicatus	Sp. nov	Valid	Rabelo Leite, Ferreira da Silva-Caminha & D'Apolito	Miocene	Solimões Basin	Brazil	Pollen of a flowering plant. Announced in 2020; the final version of the article naming it was published in 2021.	
Psilaperiporites lunaris	Sp. nov	Valid	Rabelo Leite, Ferreira da Silva-Caminha & D'Apolito	Miocene	Solimões Basin	Brazil	Pollen of a flowering plant. Announced in 2020; the final version of the article naming it was published in 2021.	
Ranunculacidites reticulatus	Sp. nov	Valid	Rabelo Leite, Ferreira da Silva-Caminha & D'Apolito	Miocene	Solimões Basin	Brazil	Pollen of a flowering plant. Announced in 2020; the final version of the article naming it was published in 2021.	
Rasenganus	Gen. et sp. nov	Valid	Xing & Gu	Late Cretaceous (Cenomanian)	Burmese amber	Myanmar	A possible epizoochorous fruit. Genus includes new species R. auricularus.	
Retibrevitricolpites microreticulatus	Sp. nov	Valid	Rabelo Leite, Ferreira da Silva-Caminha & D'Apolito	Miocene	Solimões Basin	Brazil	Pollen of a flowering plant. Announced in 2020; the final version of the article naming it was published in 2021.	
Retibrevitricolporites costaporus	Sp. nov	Valid	Rabelo Leite, Ferreira da Silva-Caminha & D'Apolito	Miocene	Solimões Basin	Brazil	Pollen of a flowering plant. Announced in 2020; the final version of the article naming it was published in 2021.	
Retibrevitricolporites? toigoae	Sp. nov	Valid	Rabelo Leite, Ferreira da Silva-Caminha & D'Apolito	Miocene	Solimões Basin	Brazil	Pollen of a flowering plant. Announced in 2020; the final version of the article naming it was published in 2021.	
Retipollenites solimoensis	Sp. nov	Valid	Rabelo Leite, Ferreira da Silva-Caminha & D'Apolito	Miocene	Solimões Basin	Brazil	Pollen of a flowering plant. Announced in 2020; the final version of the article naming it was published in 2021.	
Retitriporites crassoreticulatus	Sp. nov	Valid	Rabelo Leite, Ferreira da Silva-Caminha & D'Apolito	Miocene	Solimões Basin	Brazil	Pollen of a flowering plant. Announced in 2020; the final version of the article naming it was published in 2021.	
Rhoipites alfredii	Sp. nov	Valid	Rabelo Leite, Ferreira da Silva-Caminha & D'Apolito	Miocene	Solimões Basin	Brazil	Pollen of a flowering plant. Announced in 2020; the final version of the article naming it was published in 2021.	
Singpuria	Gen. et sp. nov	Valid	Ramteke, Manchester & Nagrale in Ramteke et al.	Late Cretaceous (Maastrichtian)	Deccan Intertrappean Beds	India	A member of Pentapetalae of uncertain phylogenetic placement. Genus includes new species S. kapgatei.	
Sinoherba	Gen. et sp. nov	Valid	Liu & Wang in Liu, Chen & Wang	Early Cretaceous (Barremian–Aptian)	Yixian Formation	China	An early monocot. Genus includes new species S. ningchengensis. Announced in 2020; the final version of the article naming it was published in 2021.	
Varifructus	Gen. et sp. nov	In press	Liu et al.	Early Cretaceous	Yixian Formation	China	An early flowering plant. Genus includes new species V. lingyuanensis.	
Wireroadia	Gen. et sp. et comb. nov	Valid	Zhang et al.	Late Cretaceous (Cenomanian to Santonian)		United States (Alabama; Massachusetts; New Jersey; New York)	A winged fruit of a eudicot of uncertain phylogenetic placement. Genus includes new species W. viccallii, as well as W. major (Hollick).	

== Pinales ==
Name	Novelty	Status	Authors	Age	Type locality	Location	Notes	Images
Agathis ledongensis	Sp. nov	Valid	Oskolski et al.	Late Oligocene–early Miocene	Qiutangling Formation	China	A species of Agathis	
Agathoxylon cozzoi	Sp. nov	Valid	Gnaedinger & Zavattieri	Late Triassic	Chihuido Formation	Argentina		
Araucaria cuneoi	Sp. nov	Valid	Noll & Kunzmann	Middle Jurassic		Argentina	A species of Araucaria.	
Araucaria famii	Sp. nov	Valid	Stockey & Rothwell	Late Cretaceous (Campanian)		Canada (British Columbia)	A species of Araucaria.	
Araucaria fildesensis	Sp. nov	Valid	Shi et al.	Eocene	Fossil Hill Formation	Antarctica (King George Island)	A species of Araucaria	
Araucaria huncoensis	Sp. nov	Valid	Rossetto-Harris in Rossetto-Harris et al.	Early Eocene	Laguna del Hunco Formation	Argentina	A species of Araucaria.	
Araucaria stockeyana	Sp. nov	Valid	Noll & Kunzmann	Middle Jurassic		Argentina	A species of Araucaria.	
Araucarites pachacuteci	Sp. nov	In press	Martínez in Martínez et al.	Early Cretaceous (Berriasian–Valanginian)	Huancané Formation	Peru	A member of the family Araucariaceae	
Brachyoxylon zhouii	Sp. nov	Valid	Jiang et al.	Early Cretaceous	Guantou Formation	China	A conifer wood. Announced in 2020; the final version of the article naming it was published in 2021.	
Brachyphyllum sattlerae	Sp. nov	Valid	Batista et al.	Early Cretaceous (Aptian)	Crato Formation	Brazil	A member of the family Pinidae.	
Callialastrobus	Gen. et sp. nov	In press	Kvaček & Mendes	Early Cretaceous (late Aptian–early Albian)	Lusitanian Basin	Portugal	A pollen cone of a member of Araucariaceae. Genus includes new species C. sousai.	
Cedrus anatolica	Sp. nov	Valid	Akkemik	Early Miocene	Hançili Formation	Turkey	A species of Cedrus. Announced in 2020; the final version of the article naming it was published in 2021.	
Circoporoxylon tibetense	Sp. nov	In press	Xia et al.	Middle Jurassic (Callovian)	Xiali Formation	China	Possibly a member of the family Podocarpaceae.	
Comoxostrobus	Gen. et sp. nov	Valid	Stockey, Rothwell & Atkinson	Late Cretaceous (early Coniacian)		Canada (British Columbia)	A member of the family Cupressaceae belonging to the subfamily Taiwanioideae. Genus includes new species C. rossii.	
Cupressinoxylon klimovii	Nom. nov	Valid	Blokhina	Miocene		Russia	A member of the family Cupressaceae; a replacement name for Cupressinoxylon biotoides Blokhina (1989).	
Cupressinoxylon llantenesense	Sp. nov	Valid	Gnaedinger & Zavattieri	Late Triassic	Llantenes Formation	Argentina		
Cupressinoxylon manuelii	Sp. nov	In press	Ríos-Santos, Cevallos-Ferriz & Pujana	Late Cretaceous (Campanian-Maastrichtian)	Cabullona Group	Mexico		
Ductoagathoxylon wangii	Sp. nov	In press	Gou & Feng in Gou et al.	Middle Jurassic	Xishanyao Formation	China	A conifer stem.	
Friisia	Gen. et sp. nov	In press	Mendes & Kvaček	Early Cretaceous (late Aptian – early Albian)	Lusitanian Basin	Portugal	An ovuliferous cone of a member of the family Podocarpaceae. Genus includes new species F. lusitanica.	
Juniperoxylon acarcaea	Sp. nov	In press	Akkemik	Early Miocene	Hançili Formation	Turkey	A member of the family Cupressaceae.	
Lesbosoxylon kemaliyensis	Sp. nov	Valid	Akkemik & Mantzouka in Akkemik, Mantzouka & Kıran Yıldırım	Miocene	Divriği Formation	Turkey	A member of the family Pinaceae.	
Marskea cuspidata	Sp. nov	Valid	Frolov & Mashchuk	Middle Jurassic	Prisayan Formation	Russia	A member of the family Taxaceae.	
Mukawastrobus	Gen. et sp. nov	Valid	Stockey, Nishida & Rothwell	Late Cretaceous (late Campanian—early Maastrichtian)		Japan	A member of the family Cupressaceae belonging to the subfamily Taiwanioideae. Genus includes new species M. satoi.	
Piceoxylon yumeniense	Sp. nov	Valid	Zhou, Peng, Deng, Zhang & Yang in Zhou et al.	Early Cretaceous	Xiagou Formation	China	Fossil wood of a member of the family Pinaceae. Announced in 2020; the final version of the article naming it was published in 2021.	
Pinuxylon selmeierianum	Sp. nov	Valid	Dolezych & Reinhardt	Paleogene	Eureka Sound Group	Canada (Nunavut)	A member of the family Pinaceae described on the basis of fossil wood	
Protophyllocladoxylon chijinense	Sp. nov	Valid	Zhou, Peng, Deng, Zhang & Yang in Zhou et al.	Early Cretaceous	Xiagou Formation	China	Announced in 2020; the final version of the article naming it was published in 2021.	
Tsuga asiatica	Sp. nov	Valid	Wu & Zhou in Wu et al.	Late Paleogene		China	A species of Tsuga. Announced in 2019; the final version of the article naming it was published in 2020.	

== Other seed plants ==
Name	Novelty	Status	Authors	Age	Type locality	Location	Notes	Images
Amyelon turpanense	Sp. nov	In press	Shi, Yu & Sun	Permian (Lopingian)	Wutonggou	China	A root of a member of Cordaitales	
Androstrobus obovatus	Sp. nov	In press	Bodnar et al.	Late Triassic	Potrerillos Formation	Argentina	A member of Cycadales.	
Araripestrobus	Gen. et sp. nov	Valid	Seyfullah, Roberts, Schmidt & Kunzmann in Seyfullah et al.	Early Cretaceous (Aptian-Albian)	Crato	Brazil	A seed plant belonging to the group Erdtmanithecales. Genus includes new species A. resinosus.	
Archaeopetalanthus	Gen. et sp. nov	Valid	Naugolnykh	Carboniferous	Listvjanskaya	Russia	A member of Pinophyta belonging to the group Vojnovskyales. Genus includes new species A. progressus.	
Battenispermum	Gen. et sp. nov	In press	Mendes, Pedersen & Friis	Early Cretaceous		Portugal	A seed plant belonging to the informal grouping Bennettitales-Erdtmanithecales-Gnetales. Genus includes new species B. hirsutum.	
Carpolithus volantus	Sp. nov	Valid	Gómez et al.	Early Cretaceous (Aptian)	La Cantera Formation	Argentina	A fossil seed, possibly produced by a member of Gnetales.	
Ductolobatopitys	Gen. et sp. nov	Valid	Conceição & Crisafulli in Conceição et al.	Permian (Cisuralian)	Pedra de Fogo Formation	Brazil	A gymnosperm described on the basis of fossil wood. Genus includes new species D. mussae.	
Filigigantopteris	Gen. et 2 sp. nov	In press	Zhou et al.	Late Permian	Nayixiong Formation	China	A gigantopterid. Genus includes new species F. asymmetrica and F. dahaia.	
Ginkgo pediculata	Sp. nov	In press	Deng, Yang & Zhou	Early Cretaceous		China	A species of Ginkgo.	
Jianchangia	Gen. et sp. nov	Valid	Yang, Wang & Ferguson	Early Cretaceous (Aptian)	Jiufotang Formation	China	A member of Ephedraceae. Genus includes new species J. verticillata.	
Johniphyllum	Gen. et sp. nov	Valid	Looy & Duijnstee	Permian (Guadalupian)		United States (Texas)	A member of Voltziales. Genus includes new species J. multinerve.	
Jordaniopteris	Gen. et comb. nov	Valid	Anderson in Anderson et al.	Permian (possibly Lopingian)	Um Irna Formation	Jordan	A seed fern. A new genus for "Dicroidium" irnensis Abu Hamad et al. (2008); genus also includes "Dicroidium" jordanensis Abu Hamad et al. (2008), "Dicroidium" robustum Kerp & Vörding (2008) and "Dicroidium" bandelii Abu Hamad et al. (2017).	
Kaokoxylon brasiliensis	Sp. nov	Valid	Conceição, Neregato & Iannuzzi in Conceição et al.	Permian (Cisuralian)	Pedra de Fogo Formation	Brazil	A conifer described on the basis of fossil wood.	
Nilssonia mirovanae	Sp. nov	Valid	Čepičková & Kvaček	Late Cretaceous (Cenomanian)	Peruc-Korycany Formation	Czech Republic	A cycad.	
Novaiorquepitys	Gen. et sp. nov	In press	Conceição & Crisafulli in Conceição et al.	Permian (Cisuralian)	Pedra de Fogo Formation	Brazil	A gymnosperm stem. Genus includes new species N. maranhensis Conceição, Neregato & Iannuzzi.	
Ovalocarpus butmanii	Sp. nov	Valid	Naugolnykh & Linkevich	Permian (Artinskian)		Russia (Sverdlovsk Oblast)	A member of Ginkgoales belonging to the family Cheirocladaceae.	
Palaeocupressinoxylon	Gen. et sp. nov	In press	Wan, Yang & Wang	Late Permian	Turpan–Hami Basin	China	A silicified gymnospermous fossil wood. Genus includes new species P. uniseriale.	
Phoenicopsis anadyrensis	Sp. nov	Valid	Nosova in Zolina et al.	Late Cretaceous–Paleocene (Maastrichtian–Danian)	Rarytkin	Russia (Chukotka Autonomous Okrug)	A member of Czekanowskiales	
Pseudovoltzia sapflorensis	Sp. nov	Valid	Looy & Duijnstee	Permian (Guadalupian)		United States (Texas)	A member of Voltziales	
Pterostoma neehoffii	Sp. nov	Valid	Conran et al.	Middle Miocene		New Zealand	A cycad	
Pteruchus frenguellii	Sp. nov	In press	Blomenkemper et al.	Late Permian	Umm Irna Formation	Jordan	A pollen organ of a seed fern	
Pteruchus lepidus	Sp. nov	In press	Blomenkemper et al.	Late Permian	Umm Irna Formation	Jordan	A pollen organ of a seed fern	
Samaropsis jinchangensis	Sp. nov	Valid	Hua & Sun in Hua et al.	Early Permian		China	A seed fossil. Announced in 2019; the final version of the article naming was published in 2020.	
Umaltolepis involuta	Sp. nov	In press	Nosova	Middle Jurassic	Angren Formation	Uzbekistan		
Umaltolepis sogdianica	Sp. nov	In press	Nosova	Middle Jurassic	Angren Formation	Uzbekistan		
Umkomasia aequatorialis	Sp. nov	In press	Blomenkemper et al.	Late Permian	Umm Irna Formation	Jordan	A cupulate structure of a seed fern	
Wantus	Gen. et sp. nov	Valid	Looy & Duijnstee	Permian (Guadalupian)		United States (Texas)	A member of Voltziales. Genus includes new species W. acaulis.	
Wudaeophyton	Gen. et sp. nov	Valid	Pšenička et al.	Early Permian	Taiyuan Formation	China	A small vine, most similar to pteridosperms from the group Callistophytales. Genus includes new species W. wangii.	
Yangopteris	Gen. et comb. nov	In press	Zhou et al.	Permian (Asselian)		China	A seed fern; a new genus for "Alethopteris" ascendens Halle.	
Yvyrapitys	Gen. et sp. nov	In press	Conceição & Crisafulli in Conceição et al.	Permian (Cisuralian)	Pedra de Fogo Formation	Brazil	A gymnosperm stem. Genus includes new species Y. novaiorquensis Conceição, Neregato & Iannuzzi.	

== Other plants ==
Name	Novelty	Status	Authors	Age	Type locality	Location	Notes	Images
Annularia paisii	Sp. nov	Valid	Correia et al.	Carboniferous (Gzhelian)		Portugal		
Blasiites huolinhensis	Sp. nov	In press	Li et al.	Early Cretaceous	Huolinhe Formation	China	A liverwort belonging to the family Blasiaceae.	
Botryopteris multifolia	Sp. nov	In press	He et al.	Permian (Lopingian)	Junlian Formation	China	A fern	
Birisia mandshurica	Sp. nov	Valid	Golovneva, Grabovskiy & Zolina	Early Cretaceous (Albian)	Frentsevka Formation	Russia (Primorsky Krai)	A fern belonging to the family Dicksoniaceae.	
Calamites cambrensis	Sp. nov	Valid	Thomas	Carboniferous (Pennsylvanian)		United Kingdom		
Catenuporella	Gen. et sp. nov	Valid	Zhang et al.	Late Ordovician	Ordos Basin	China	A green alga belonging to the group Dasycladales. Genus includes new species C. gigantia.	
Charaxis spicatus	emend. nov.	Valid	Pérez-Cano, Bover-Arnal et Martín-Closas in Pérez-Cano et al.	Barremian	Maestrat Basin	Spain	Thallus of Echinochara lazarii. Both taxa has been firstly found anatomically attached	
Chlamydomonas hanublikanus	Sp. nov		Vršanská & Hinkelman	Late Cretaceous (Cenomanian)	Burmese amber	Myanmar	A species of Chlamydomonas	
Circinites	Gen. et sp. nov	In press	Robledo & Anzótegui in Robledo et al.	Miocene-Pliocene		Argentina	A fern belonging to the family Pteridaceae. Genus includes new species C. pteridoides.	
Clavatisporites cenomaniana	Sp. nov	Valid	Santamarina in Santamarina et al.	Late Cretaceous (Cenomanian)	Mata Amarilla Formation	Argentina	Spores of a member of Filicopsida of uncertain phylogenetic placement. Announced in 2019; the final version of the article naming it is scheduled to be published in 2020.	
Clavator calcitrapus var. jiangluoensis	comb. nov	Valid	Pérez-Cano, Bover-Arnal et Martín-Closas in Pérez-Cano et al.	Barremian	Maestrat Basin	Spain	Clavatoracean species.	
Collarecodium? nezpercae	Sp. nov	Valid	Bucur & Rigaud in Bucur et al.	Late Triassic (Norian)		United States (Idaho)	A green alga belonging to the group Bryopsidales and possibly to the family Udoteaceae.	
Collarisporites minor	Sp. nov	Valid	Santamarina in Santamarina et al.	Late Cretaceous (Cenomanian)	Mata Amarilla Formation	Argentina	Spores of a member of Filicopsida of uncertain phylogenetic placement. Announced in 2019; the final version of the article naming it is scheduled to be published in 2020.	
Coniopteris sandaolingensis	Sp. nov	Valid	Yuan & Sun in Yuan et al.	Middle Jurassic	Xishanyao Formation	China		
Dimicheleodendron	Gen. et comb. nov	Valid	Thomas & Cleal	Carboniferous		United Kingdom	A lycophyte; a new genus for "Lepidodendron" hickii.	
Drynaria diplosticha	Sp. nov	Valid	Yu & Xie in Yu et al.	Late Miocene	Bangmai Formation	China	A fern belonging to the family Polypodiaceae.	
Echinochara lazarii	comb. nov	Valid	Pérez-Cano, Bover-Arnal et Martín-Closas in Pérez-Cano et al.	Barremian	Maestrat Basin	Spain	A member of Clavatoraceans.	
Equicalastrobus pusillus	Sp. nov	Valid	Zhang & Yan in Zhang et al.	Late Triassic	Baojishan Basin	China	A member of Equisetales. Announced in 2020; the final version of the article naming was published in 2021.	
Equisetum yenbaiense	Sp. nov	Valid	Aung et al.	Late Miocene		Vietnam	A species of Equisetum	
Equisetum yongpingense	Sp. nov	Valid	Aung et al.	Late Pliocene	Sanying Formation	Vietnam	A species of Equisetum	
Filippoporella	Gen. et sp. nov	In press	Sokač & Grgasović	Early Paleocene		Croatia	A green alga belonging to the group Dasycladales. Genus includes new species F. barattoloi.	
Frullania partita	Sp. nov	Valid	Li et al.	Late Cretaceous (Cenomanian)	Burmese amber	Myanmar	A liverwort, a species of Frullania	
Frullania vanae	Sp. nov	Valid	Mamontov et al.	Eocene	Rovno amber	Ukraine	A liverwort, a species of Frullania	
Gippslandites	Gen. et sp. nov	Valid	McSweeney, Shimeta & Buckeridge	Late Silurian–early Devonian		Australia	A member of Zosterophyllaceae. Genus includes new species G. minutus.	
Gmujij	Gen. et sp. nov	Valid	Pfeiler & Tomescu	Devonian (Emsian)	Battery Point	Canada (Quebec)	An early euphyllophyte. Genus includes new species G. tetraxylopteroides. Announced in 2020; the final version of the article naming it was published in 2021.	
Griphoporella minuta	Sp. nov	Valid	Bucur & Peybernes in Bucur et al.	Late Triassic		Japan	A green alga belonging to the group Dasycladales and the family Triploporellaceae.	
Hansopteris	Gen. et sp. nov	In press	Zhou et al.	Permian (Asselian)		China	An anachoropterid fern. Genus includes new species H. uncinatus.	
Holosporella magna	Sp. nov	Valid	Bucur & Fucelli in Bucur et al.	Late Triassic (Norian)		United States (Nevada)	A green alga belonging to the group Dasycladales and the family Triploporellaceae.	
Holosporella? rossanae	Sp. nov	Valid	Bucur & Del Piero in Bucur et al.	Late Triassic (Norian)		Canada (Yukon)	A green alga belonging to the group Dasycladales and the family Triploporellaceae.	
Inocladus	Gen. et comb. nov	Valid	LoDuca et al.	Silurian		United States	An alga related to the group Bryopsidales. Genus includes "Buthotrephis" divaricata White (1901), "B." newlini White (1901), "B." lesquereuxi Grote & Pitt (1876) and "Chondrites" verus Ruedemann (1925). Announced in 2020; the final version of the article naming it was published in 2021.	
Intermurella ordosensis	Sp. nov	Valid	Zhang et al.	Late Ordovician	Ordos Basin	China	A green alga belonging to the group Dasycladales.	
Jurafructus	Gen. et sp. nov	Valid	Chen et al.	Middle−Late Jurassic	Jiulongshan Formation	China	A plant of uncertain phylogenetic placement, possibly a flowering plant described on the basis of a probable fossil drupe. Genus includes new species J. daohugouensis.	
Keraphyton	Gen. et sp. nov	Valid	Champreux, Meyer-Berthaud & Decombeix	Devonian (Famennian)	Mandowa Mudstone Formation	Australia	A member of Iridopteridales of uncertain phylogenetic placement. Genus includes new species K. mawsoniae.	
Khasurtya	Gen. et sp. nov	Valid	Mamontov in Kopylov et al.	Early Cretaceous		Russia	A liverwort belonging to the group Marchantiidae. Genus includes new species K. ginkgoides.	
Lepidodendron demkinae	Sp. nov	Valid	Mosseichik	Carboniferous (Viséan)		Russia		
Lobatannularia linjiaensis	Sp. nov	Valid	Xu et al.	Middle Triassic	Linjia Formation	China	A member of Equisetales.	
Lygodium sanshuiense	Sp. nov	Valid	Naugolnykh et al.	Paleocene	Buxin Formation	China	A species of Lygodium. Announced in 2019; the final version of the article naming it was published in 2020.	
Metzgeriites kujiensis	Sp. nov	Valid	Katagiri in Katagiri & Shinden	Late Cretaceous (Santonian)	Tamagawa Formation	Japan	A liverwort.	
Munieria martinclosasi	comb. nov.	Valid	Pérez-Cano, Bover-Arnal et Martín-Closas in Pérez-Cano et al.	Barremian	Lebanon	Lebanon	Clavatoracean thallus. Formerly known as Charaxis martinclosasi	
Neoarthropitys	Gen. et sp. nov	In press	Gnaedinger et al.	Middle Triassic	Quebrada de los Fósiles	Argentina	A member of Equisetales. Genus includes new species N. gondwanaensis.	
Osmundacaulis asiatica	Sp. nov	Valid	Cheng et al.	Cretaceous		China	A member of the family Osmundaceae	
Osmundacaulis sinica	Sp. nov	Valid	Cheng et al.	Cretaceous		China	A member of the family Osmundaceae	
Ovoidites circumplicatus	Sp. nov	Valid	Zavattieri, Gutiérrez & Monti	Middle Triassic	Quebrada de los Fósiles Formation	Argentina	A green alga belonging to the group Zygnematales.	
Ovoidites tripartitus	Sp. nov	Valid	Zavattieri, Gutiérrez & Monti	Middle Triassic	Quebrada de los Fósiles Formation	Argentina	A green alga belonging to the group Zygnematales.	
Palaeostachya guanglongii	Sp. nov	In press	Liu et al.	Permian (Asselian)	Taiyuan Formation	China	A member of the family Calamitaceae.	
Parazosterophyllum	Gen. et sp. nov	Valid	McSweeney, Shimeta & Buckeridge	Late Silurian–early Devonian		Australia	A member of Zosterophyllaceae. Genus includes new species P. timsiae.	
Patruliuspora oregonica	Sp. nov	Valid	Bucur & Rigaud in Bucur et al.	Late Triassic (Norian)		United States (Oregon)	A green alga belonging to the group Dasycladales and the family Polyphysaceae.	
Patruliuspora pacifica	Sp. nov	Valid	Bucur, Del Piero & Peyrotty in Bucur et al.	Late Triassic (Norian)		Canada (Yukon)	A green alga belonging to the group Dasycladales and the family Polyphysaceae.	
Pellites hamiensis	Sp. nov	Valid	Li et al.	Middle Jurassic	Xishanyao	China	A liverwort belonging to the family Pelliaceae.	
Plenasium (Aurealcaulis) elegans	Sp. nov	In press	Hiller et al.	Eocene	Na Duong Formation	Vietnam	A member of Osmundaceae	
Pleuromeia shaolinii	Sp. nov	Valid	Zhang & Wang in Zhang et al.	Middle Triassic	Linjia	China		
Polycingulatisporites multiverrucata	Sp. nov	Valid	Santamarina in Santamarina et al.	Late Cretaceous (Cenomanian)	Mata Amarilla	Argentina	Spores of a member of Bryophyta of uncertain phylogenetic placement, possibly of sphagnaceous affinity. Announced in 2019; the final version of the article naming it was published in 2020.	
Polypodiisporites minutiverrucatus	Sp. nov	Valid	Rabelo Leite, Ferreira da Silva-Caminha & D'Apolito	Miocene	Solimões Basin	Brazil	Pteridophyte spore. Announced in 2020; the final version of the article naming it was published in 2021.	
Polysporia baetica	Sp. nov	In press	Álvarez-Vázquez, Bek & Drábková	Carboniferous (Pennsylvanian)	Peñarroya-Belmez-Espiel Coalfield	Spain	A member of Isoetales	
Polystichum pacltovae	Sp. nov	Valid	Kvaček in Kvaček & Teodoridis	Oligocene		Czech Republic	A fern, a species of Polystichum	
Proodontosoria	Gen. et sp. nov	Valid	Li et al.	Late Cretaceous (Cenomanian)	Burmese amber	Myanmar	A fern belonging to the family Lindsaeaceae. Genus includes new species P. myanmarensis.	
Proterocladus antiquus	Sp. nov	Valid	Tang et al.	Mesoproterozoic circa 1 Ga	Nanfen	China	An early siphonocladalean chlorophyte	
Psilatriletes cozzuolii	Sp. nov	Valid	Rabelo Leite, Ferreira da Silva-Caminha & D'Apolito	Miocene	Solimões Basin	Brazil	Pteridophyte spore. Announced in 2020; the final version of the article naming it was published in 2021.	
Psilochara monevaensis	Sp. nov	Valid	Sanjuan & Soulié-Märsche	Middle Miocene		Spain	A charophyte.	
Qianshouia	Gen. et sp. nov	Valid	Huang et al.	Late Devonian	Wutong Formation	China	A plant of uncertain phylogenetic placement, possibly a lycopsid or a sphenopsid. Genus includes new species Q. mira.	
Scolecopteris minuta	Sp. nov	In press	Wan et al.	Early Permian	Taiyuan Formation	China	A fern belonging to the group Marattiales.	
Sigillaria pfefferkornii	Sp. nov	In press	D'Antonio, Boyce & Wang	Permian (Asselian)		China		
Sigillaria wudensis	Sp. nov	In press	D'Antonio, Boyce & Wang	Permian (Asselian)		China		
Sphaerochara miocenica	Sp. nov	Valid	Sanjuan & Soulié-Märsche	Miocene		Lebanon; Spain	A charophyte.	
Thyrsopteris cretacea	Sp. nov	Valid	Li et al.	Late Cretaceous (Cenomanian)	Burmese amber	Myanmar	A species of Thyrsopteris	
Tomiostrobus sinensis	Sp. nov	Valid	Feng in Feng et al.	Early Triassic (Induan)	Kayitou Formation	China	A member of the family Isoetaceae.	
Tumidopteris astra	Sp. nov	Valid	Naugolnykh	Permian (Roadian)	Pechora coal basin	Russia	A fern belonging to the family Gleicheniaceae.	
Ufadendron elongatum	Sp. nov	Valid	Tang et al.	Late Permian	Linxi	China	A lycopsid belonging to the family Tomiodendraceae	
Uzhurodendron	Gen. et sp. nov	Valid	Mosseichik & Filimonov	Carboniferous (Tournaisian)	Bystrianskaya	Russia (Krasnoyarsk Krai)	A member of Lycopodiopsida. Genus includes new species U. asiaticum.	
Zeilleria fosteri	Sp. nov	Valid	Thomas et al.	Carboniferous (Bashkirian)		United Kingdom	A fern	

== General research ==
- A study on the evolutionary history of green plants is published by Nie et al. (2020).
- Description of new fossil material of Yurtusia uniformis from the Cambrian Yanjiahe Formation (China) and a study on the phylogenetic relationships and possible life cycle of this organism is published by Shang et al. (2020), who consider Y. uniformis to be a likely green microalga.
- A study on the phylogenetic relationships of extant and fossil complex thalloid liverworts (Marchantiidae) is published by Flores et al. (2020).
- Evidence of development of dichotomous roots in euphyllophytes that were extant during the Devonian and Carboniferous periods is presented by Hetherington, Berry & Dolan (2020), who interpret their findings as indicating that dichotomous root branching evolved in both lycophytes and euphyllophytes.
- An early land plant producing multiple spore size classes is described from the Lower Devonian Campbellton Formation (Canada) by Bonacorsi et al. (2020).
- A study on the impact of the appearance and evolution of herbivorous tetrapods on the evolution of land plants from the Carboniferous to the Early Triassic is published by Brocklehurst, Kammerer & Benson (2020).
- A study on the production of periderm in Late Paleozoic arborescent lycopsids is published by D'Antonio & Boyce (2020), who argue that these lycopsids did not grow from sporelings into large trees through the production of a periderm cylinder, because physiological limitations would have prohibited the production of thick periderm.
- A study on the architecture and development of the Carboniferous arborescent lycopsid Paralycopodites is published by DiMichele & Bateman (2020).
- New information on the anatomy of Weichselia reticulata is presented by Blanco-Moreno, Decombeix & Prestianni (2020).
- A study on the phylogenetic placement of the extinct fern genus Coniopteris is published by Li et al. (2020).
- New information on the morphology of Paleoazolla patagonica is presented by Benedetti et al. (2020), who evaluate the implications of this taxon for the knowledge of the evolution of water ferns.
- A study aiming to determine which ferns were most likely to be the producers of Cyathidites spores from earliest Paleocene plant localities across western North America, and were most likely to be among the first plants in western North America to thrive in the immediate aftermath of the Cretaceous–Paleogene extinction event, is published by Berry (2020).
- A study on the morphology and development of Genomosperma, and on its implications for the knowledge of the evolutionary origins of seed development, is published by Meade, Plackett & Hilton (2020).
- A pollen organ resembling seed fern pollen organs Dictyothalamus and Melissiotheca is described from the Lopingian Umm Irna Formation (Jordan) by Zavialova et al. (2020), who interpret this finding as evidence of persistence of lyginopterid seed ferns until the late Permian.
- Evidence of increasing atmospheric CO_{2} concentration at the onset of the end-Triassic extinction event, based on data from fossil leaves of the seed fern Lepidopteris ottonis from southern Sweden, is presented by Slodownik, Vajda & Steinthorsdottir (2020), who confirm L. ottonis as a valid proxy for pCO_{2} reconstructions.
- A study on the anatomy of the seed cone scales of Krassilovia mongolica is published by Herrera et al. (2020), who argue that K. mongolica and Podozamites harrisii are the seed cones and leaves of the same extinct plant, and name a new family Krassiloviaceae within the order Voltziales.
- A study on the microscopic wood anatomy of a fossil tree trunk of Agathoxylon arizonicum with the characteristic external features of a fire scar from the Upper Triassic Chinle Formation (Petrified Forest National Park, Arizona, United States) is published by Byers et al. (2020), who evaluate the implications of this specimen for the knowledge of the evolution of fire-adapted plant traits.
- A putative bamboo "Chusquea" oxyphylla from the early Eocene Laguna del Hunco biota (Argentina) is reinterpreted as a conifer by Wilf (2020), who transfers this species to the genus Retrophyllum.
- A study on evolutionary history of conifers as indicated by fossil and molecular data, aiming to determine whether the rise of angiosperms drove the decline of conifers and other gymnosperms, is published by Condamine et al. (2020).
- Presence of secretory tissues is reported in extinct flowers from the Cretaceous amber from Myanmar and Cenozoic Dominican amber (including specimens preserved while in the process of emitting compounds) by Poinar & Poinar (2020).
- Fossil pollen of flowering plants is reported from the Aptian and Albian of Australia by Korasidis & Wagstaff (2020), who evaluate the implications of their findings for the knowledge of the timing of the appearance and diversification of the flowering plants in the high-latitude southern basins of Australia.
- A study on the morphology of palm and palm-like pollen from the Eocene Yaw Formation (Myanmar), and on the implications of these fossils for the knowledge of distribution and diversity of Eocene palms across the globe, is published by Huang et al. (2020).
- Fossils fruits of Illigera eocenica, representing the second fossil occurrence of Illigera worldwide and the first in Asia, are described from the Eocene Niubao Formation (central Tibetan Plateau) by Wang et al. (2020), who evaluate the implications of this finding for the knowledge of the climate in the central Tibetan Plateau during the early middle Eocene, and for the knowledge of the floristic links between Asia and North America during the Paleogene.
- A study on the morphology and phylogenetic relationships of Montsechia vidalii is published by Gomez et al. (2020).
- Eocene leaves of members of the family Urticaceae with stinging trichomes are described from the Okanogan Highlands (British Columbia, Canada) by DeVore et al. (2020).
- A revision of the fossil record of the family Nothofagaceae from South America is published by Pujana et al. (2020).
- A study on the extinction of plants from south polar terrestrial ecosystems during the Permian–Triassic extinction event and on their recovery after this extinction event, based on data from the Sydney Basin (Australia), is published by Mays et al. (2020).
- A study on the impact of ecological disturbances around the Permian–Triassic boundary (from the Wuchiapingian to Ladinian) on land plant communities is published by Nowak, Vérard & Kustatscher (2020).
- A study on the age of the Paleogene Kanaka Creek fossil flora (Huntingdon Formation; British Columbia, Canada) and on its implications for reconstructions of the contemporaneous paleoclimate and paleoenvironment is published by Mathewes, Greenwood & Love (2020).
- Evidence from Eocene plant fossils from the Bangong-Nujiang suture indicating that the Tibetan Plateau area hosted a diverse subtropical ecosystem approximately 47 million years ago and that this area was both low and humid at the time is presented by Su et al. (2020), who also report that the composition of this flora is similar to Early-Middle Eocene floras in both North America and Europe, but shows little affinity to Eocene floras from the Indian Plate.
- A study aiming to estimate leaf dry mass per area in fossil plants from 22 western North American sites spanning the Eocene–Oligocene transition is published online by Butrim & Royer (2020), who evaluate the implications of their findings for the knowledge of the impact of the environmental changes occurring during the Eocene–Oligocene transition on leaf-economic strategies of plants.
- A study on the Neogene paleobotanical record and climate in the northernmost part of the Central Andean Plateau, based on data from the Descanso Formation (Peru), is published by Martínez et al. (2020), who report the earliest evidence of a puna-like ecosystem in the Pliocene and a montane ecosystem without modern analogs in the Miocene.
- Fossil fruits (mericarps) of the neoendemic Apiaceae Melanoselinum (≡ Daucus) decipiens were reported from the lacustrine and fluvial sediments of Porto da Cruz, Madeira, dated 1.3 Ma, by Góis-Marques et al. 2020. This paper not only reports the oldest Daucus s.l. fossil known to date but also the first fossil evidence of a plant with insular woodiness (see Island gigantism).
- The leaf fossil Mesodescolea plicata from the Early Cretaceous of Patagonia, first interpreted as a cycad with affinities with extant Stangeria, is reinterpreted as an angiosperm leaf with affinities with Austrobaileyales or Chloranthales by Coiro et al. 2020, with implications for the evolution of leaf shape in the early radiation of the angiosperms.
- A study on the phylogenetic relationships of 10 Cretaceous flower taxa (Chloranthistemon endressii, Dakotanthus cordiformis, Kajanthus lusitanicus, Mauldinia mirabilis, Microvictoria svitkoana, Paleoclusia chevalieri, Paradinandra suecica, Spanomera mauldiniensis, Tylerianthus crossmanensis and Virginianthus calycanthoides) is published by Schönenberger et al. (2020).
