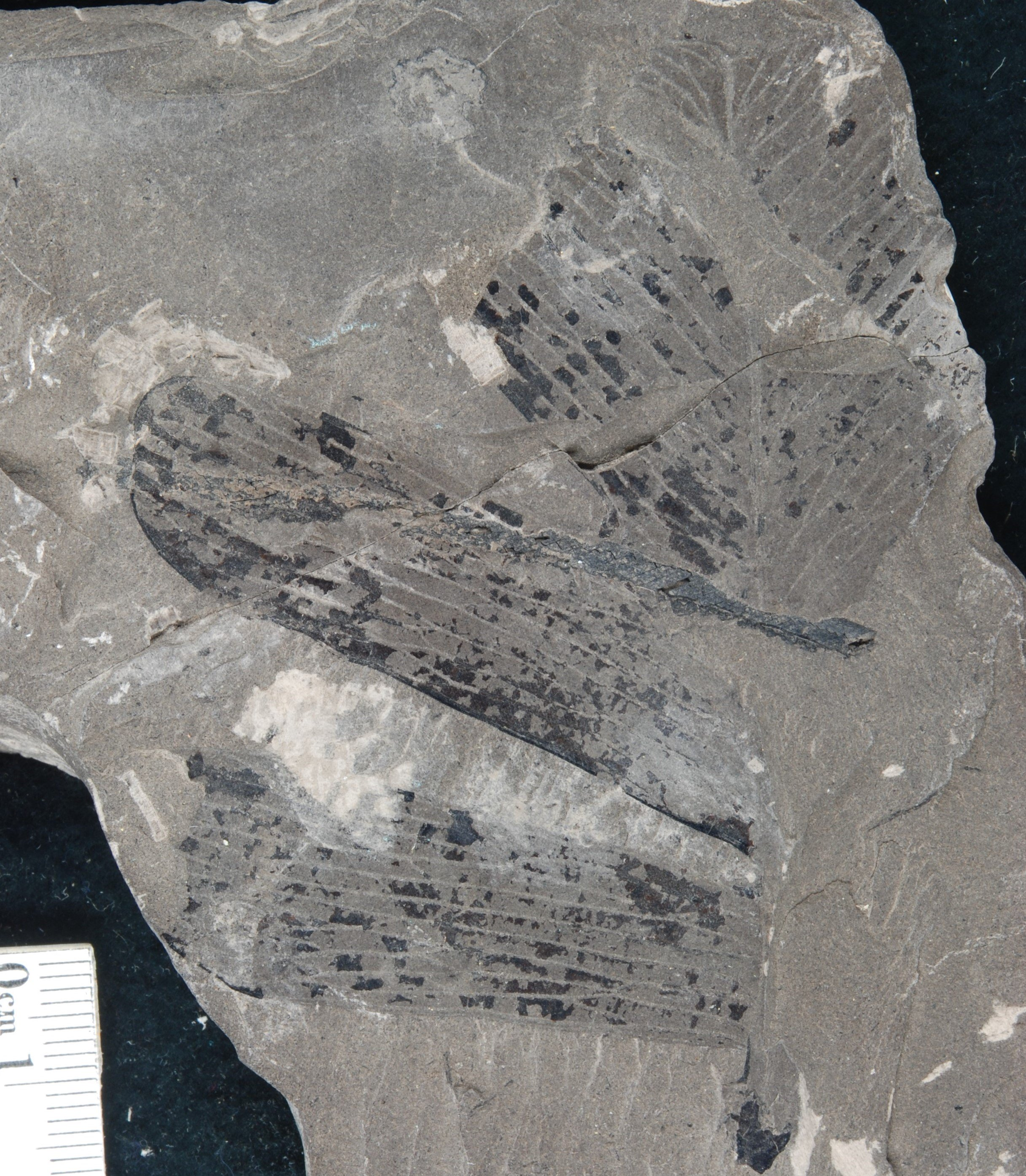
- Ctenis nilssonii

Scientific classification
- Kingdom: Plantae
- Clade: Tracheophytes
- Clade: Gymnospermae
- Division: Cycadophyta
- Class: Cycadopsida
- Order: Cycadales
- Genus: †Ctenis; Lindley & Hutton

Species
- Ctenis sulcicaulis (type species); Ctenis clarnoensis; Ctenis coronata; Ctenis exilis; Ctenis harrisii; Ctenis kaneharai; Ctenis latepinnata; Ctenis laxa; Ctenis lyrata; Ctenis mallards; Ctenis minuta; Ctenis nathorsti; Ctenis nilssonii; Ctenis stanovensis; Ctenis stewartiana

= Ctenis =

Ctenis Temporal range: Triassic–Eocene

Extinct genus of cycads

Ctenis is a genus of fossil foliage attributable to the Cycadales, being one of the most common genera of cycad fossil leaves in the Mesozoic.

== Taxonomy ==
The genus was first erected by Lindley and Hutton in "The fossil flora of Great Britain", based on material of Ctenis falcata from the Jurassic of Yorkshire. This species was later synonymized with Cycadites sulcicaulis, leading to the new combination Ctenis sulcicaulis. Later, Seward Florin, and Harris added details of the cuticle to the diagnosis of the genus.

Due to the leaves of Ctenis possessing characters unknown in any living cycad, Ctenis is thought to belong to an extinct lineage distinct from modern cycads, with a 2023 analysis finding that the genus was paraphyletic with respect to the genera Dioonopsis and Pterostoma, with this group suggested to be the sister group to Cycadaceae, from which they diverged in the Permian period.

== Description ==
The leaves of Ctenis are once pinnate, and the pinnae have multiple parallel veins that often anastomosize (i.e. fuse together). The cuticle of Ctenis has stomata with guard cells arranged in a random fashion, and the stomatal apparatus has often a cuticular ring surrounding the stomatal pit. The cuticular surface is usually striate.

== Distribution ==
Though Ctenis-like leaves are known from the Late Permian Umm Irna Formation of Jordan, Ctenis fossils becomes more common from the Late Triassic onwards. In the Jurassic, many Ctenis species are retrieved from Europe, North America, and Asia. In the Early Cretaceous, Ctenis is still found in Europe (i.e. in the Wealden Group) and Asia, but from the Late Cretaceous its range seems to retreat to more Northern Latitudes in the Siberian region and North America and Southern latitudes in Australia. The last members of this genus are found in the Eocene of North America.

== Paleoecology ==
Little is known about the ecology of the Ctenis-producing plants. However, in the Big Cedar Ridge locality in Wyoming (Campanian), Ctenis is found in the fern wetland together with ferns from the families Dipteridaceae, Gleicheniaceae, and Matoniaceae. This suggests that at least some members of the genus inhabited wet environments with peaty soils.
