= Incertae sedis =

Term to indicate an uncertain taxonomic position

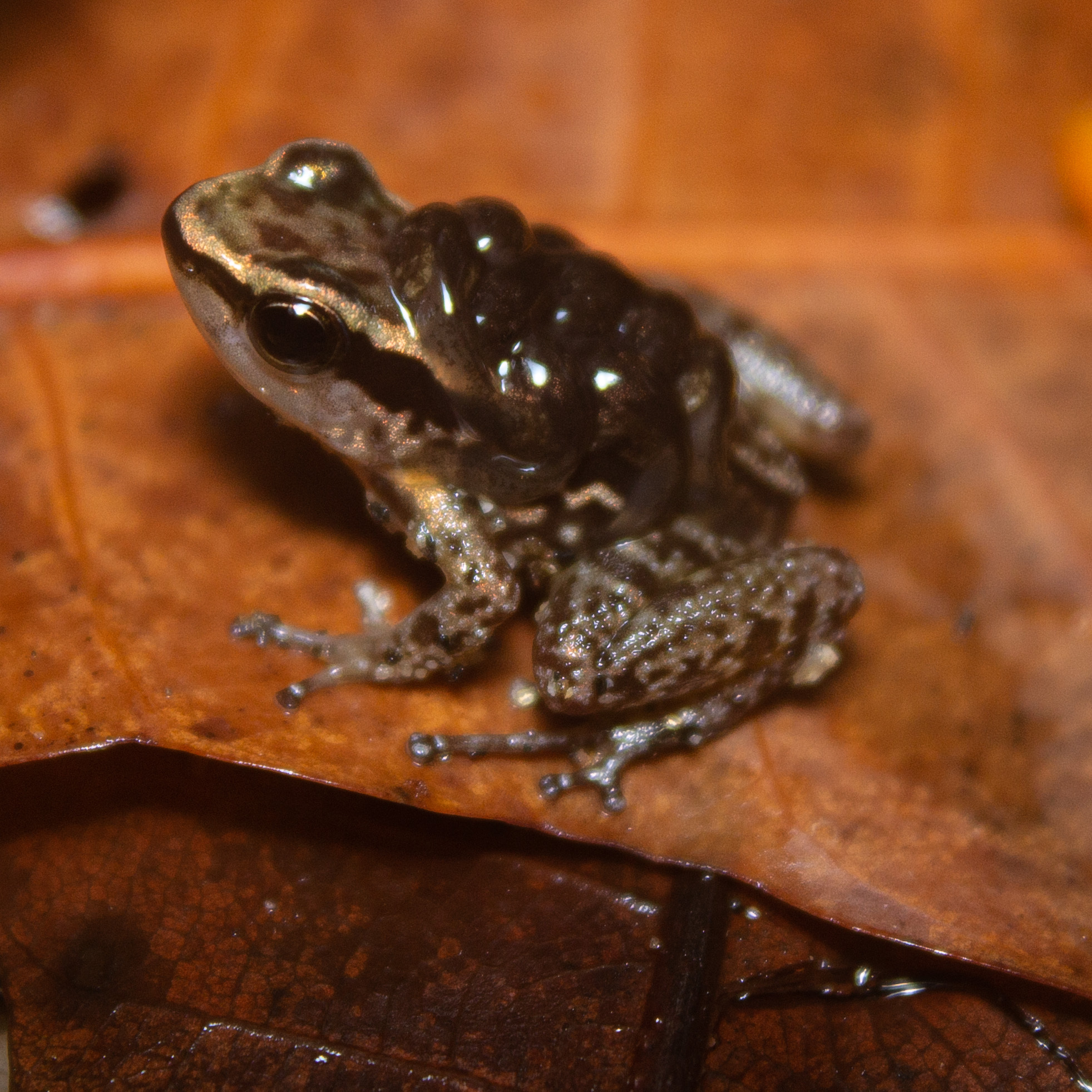
"Colostethus" ruthveni, a species of frog that is placed incertae sedis in the family Dendrobatidae

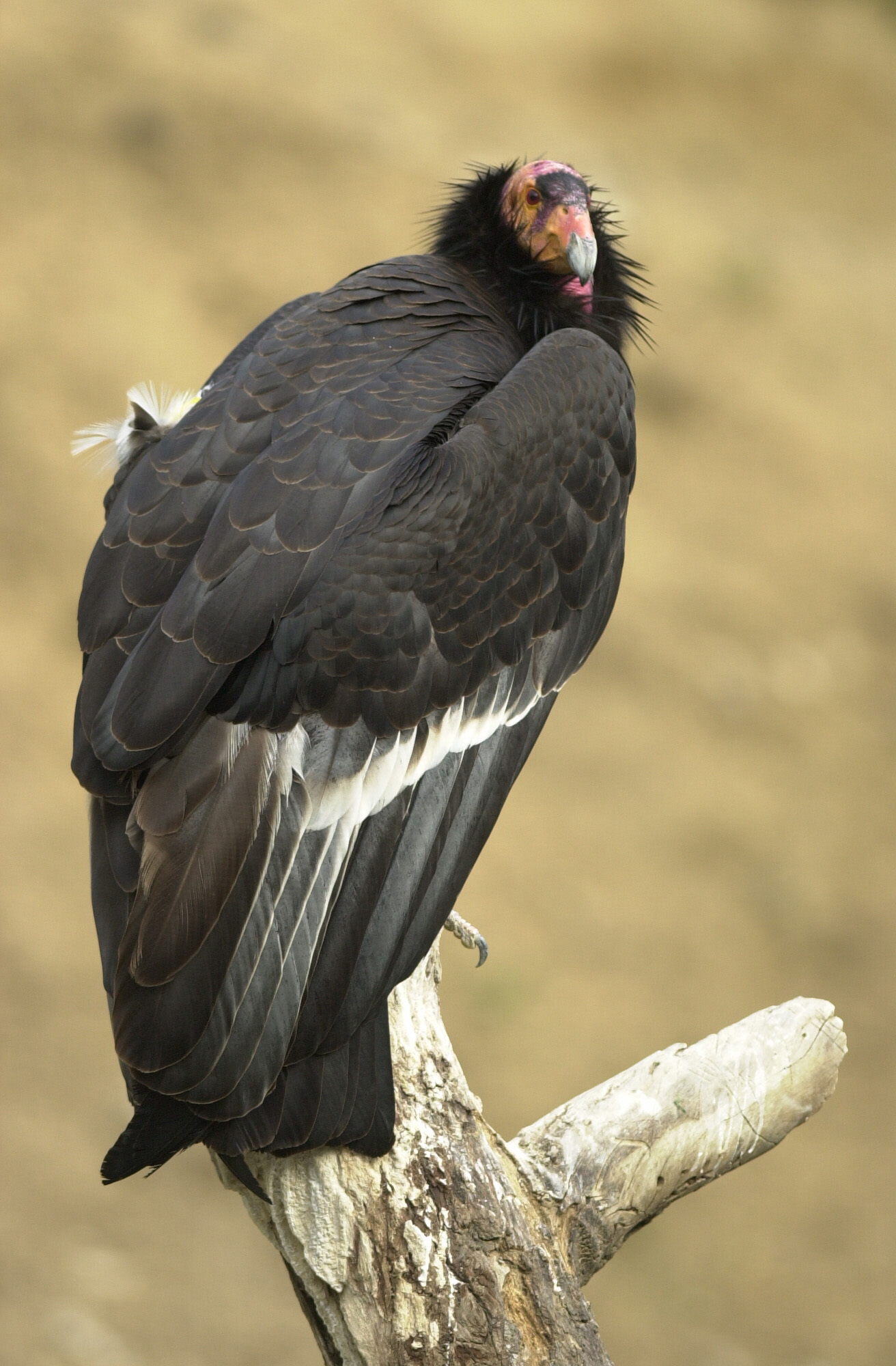
New World vultures, such as the California condor, were placed incertae sedis within the class Aves until the recognition of the new order Cathartiformes.

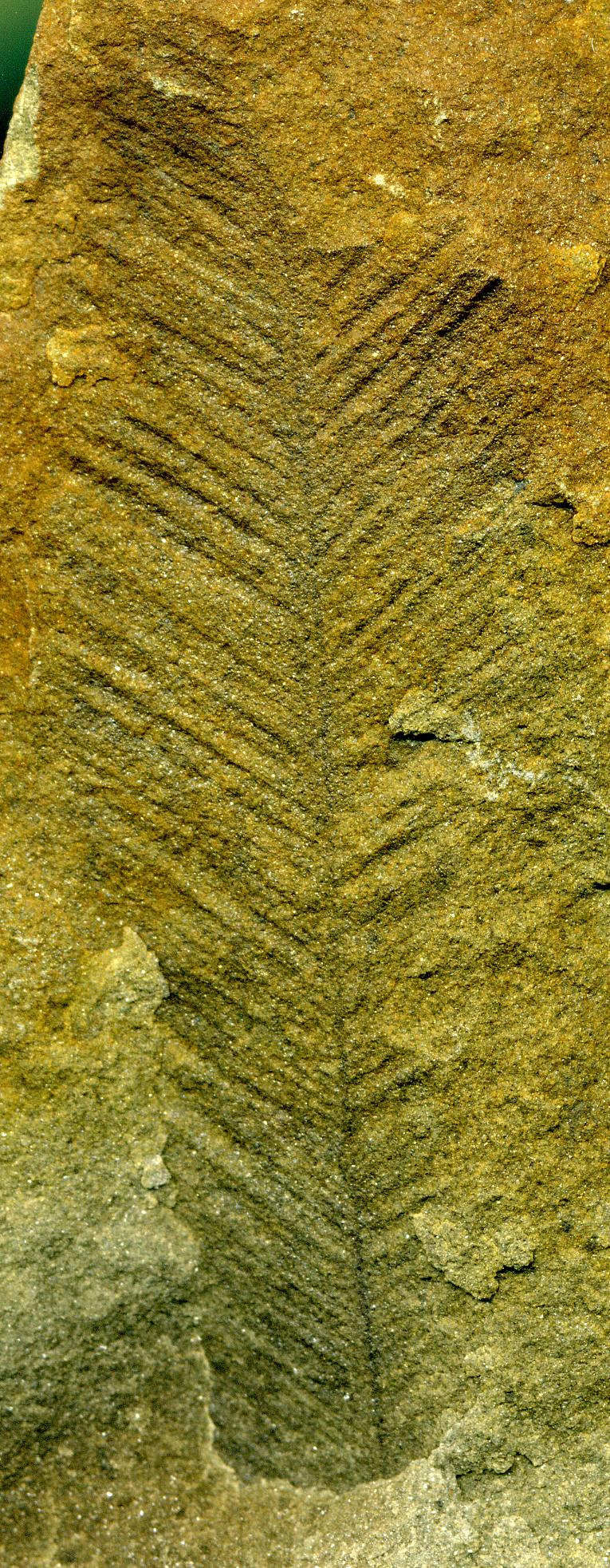
Plumalina plumaria Hall, 1858 (6.3 cm tall), Upper Devonian of western New York State, US. Workers usually assign this organism to the hydrozoans (phylum Cnidaria, class Hydrozoa) or the gorgonarians (phylum Cnidaria, class Anthozoa, order Gorgonaria), but it is probably safest to refer to it as incertae sedis.

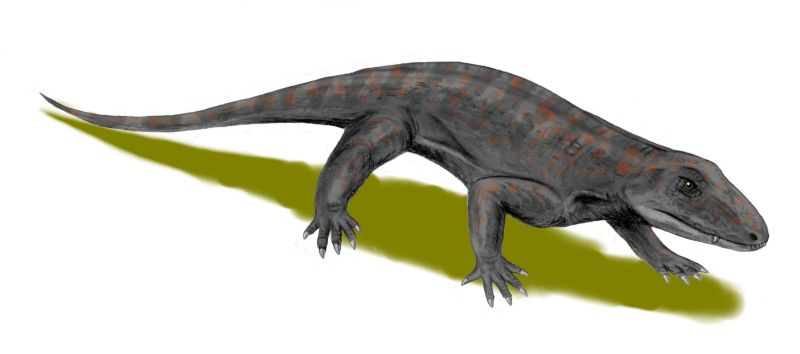
The varanopids, a mysterious family of tetrapods, had controversial relationships with many other land tetrapods. Paleolontologists have mostly assigned them in the past as eupelycosaurian synapsids. Others have placed them as basal neodiapsids. A compromise is to place them as Amniota incertae sedis.

Incertae sedis (Latin for 'of uncertain placement') or problematica is a term used for a taxonomic group whose broader relationships are unknown or undefined. Alternatively, such groups are frequently referred to as "enigmatic taxa". In the system of open nomenclature, uncertainty at specific taxonomic levels is indicated by incertae familiae (of uncertain family), incerti subordinis (of uncertain suborder), incerti ordinis (of uncertain order) and similar terms.

== Examples ==
- The fossil plant Paradinandra suecica could not be assigned to any family, but was placed incertae sedis within the order Ericales when described in 2001.
- The fossil Gluteus minimus, described in 1975, could not be assigned to any known animal phylum. The genus is therefore incertae sedis within the kingdom Animalia.
- While it was unclear to which order the New World vultures (family Cathartidae) should be assigned, they were placed in Aves incertae sedis. It was later agreed to place them in a separate order, Cathartiformes.
- Bocage's longbill, Motacilla bocagii, previously known as Amaurocichla bocagii, is a species of passerine bird that belongs to the superfamily Passeroidea. Since it was unclear to which family it belongs, it was classified as Passeroidea incertae sedis, until a 2015 phylogenetic study placed it in Motacilla of Motacillidae.
- Parakaryon myojinensis, a single-celled organism that is apparently distinct from prokaryotes and eukaryotes, being the only identified species with a completely unknown position within the tree of life.
- Biological dark matter, genetic material produced from unidentified microorganisms that appears to match no known species. Like Parakaryon, its producers' positions in the tree of life are completely unknown.
- Metallogenium is a bacterium that can form star-shaped minerals.
- Circothecidae are a family of Cambrian animals, sometimes attributed to the Hyolitha, though some authors suggest otherwise.
- The frosted phoenix moth (Titanomis sisyrota) is so rare and so obscure it is unable to be placed in any family within the Lepidoptera.
- While some taxonomists consider the Ediacaran biota to have been early animals, their true position within Eukaryota is unclear. Proposals include cnidarians, articulates, fungi, colonial protists, algae, lichens, or even an entirely unrelated and extinct kingdom.

== In formal nomenclature ==
When formally naming a taxon, uncertainty about its taxonomic classification can be problematic. The International Code of Nomenclature for algae, fungi, and plants, stipulates that "species and subdivisions of genera must be assigned to genera, and infraspecific taxa must be assigned to species, because their names are combinations", but ranks higher than the genus may be assigned incertae sedis.

== Reason for use ==
=== Poor description ===
This excerpt from a 2007 scientific paper about crustaceans of the Kuril–Kamchatka Trench and the Japan Trench describes typical circumstances through which this category is applied in discussing:

...the removal of many genera from new and existing families into a state of incertae sedis. Their reduced status was attributed largely to poor or inadequate descriptions but it was accepted that some of the vagueness in the analysis was due to insufficient character states. It is also evident that a proportion of the characters used in the analysis, or their given states for particular taxa, were inappropriate or invalid. Additional complexity, and factors that have misled earlier authorities, are intrusion by extensive homoplasies, apparent character state reversals and convergent evolution.

=== Not included in an analysis ===
If a formal phylogenetic analysis is conducted that does not include a certain taxon, the authors might choose to label the taxon incertae sedis instead of guessing its placement. This is particularly common when molecular phylogenies are generated, since tissue for many rare organisms is hard to obtain. It is also a common scenario when fossil taxa are included, since many fossils are defined based on partial information. For example, if the phylogeny was constructed using soft tissue and vertebrae as principal characters and the taxon in question is only known from a single tooth, it would be necessary to label it incertae sedis.

=== Controversy ===
If conflicting results exist or if there is not a consensus among researchers as to how a taxon relates to other organisms, it may be listed as incertae sedis until the conflict is resolved.

== Phylogenetic vs. nomenclatural uncertainty ==
The term incertae sedis refers to uncertainty about phylogenetic position of a taxon, which may be expressed, among others, by using a question mark after or before a taxon name. This should be distinguished from the situation where either it is uncertain how to use a name, often because the types have been lost (nomen dubium, species inquirenda), or whether a poorly preserved specimen should be included within a given species or genus, which is often expressed using a 'cf.' (from Latin confer, compare, before a taxon name); such a convention is especially widespread in palaeontology.

== In zoological nomenclature ==
In zoological nomenclature, "incertae sedis" is not a nomenclatural term at all per se, but is used by taxonomists in their classifications to mean "of uncertain taxonomic position".^{Glossary} In botany, a name is not validly published if it is not accepted by the author in the same publication.^{Article 36.1} In zoology, a name proposed conditionally may be available under certain conditions.^{Articles 11 and 15} For uncertainties at lower levels, some authors have proposed a system of "open nomenclature", suggesting that question marks be used to denote a questionable assignment. For example, if a new species was given the specific epithet album by Anton and attributed with uncertainty to Agenus, it could be denoted "Agenus? album Anton (?Anton)"; the "(?Anton)" indicates the author that assigned the question mark. So if Anton described Agenus album, and Bruno called the assignment into doubt, this could be denoted "Agenus? album (Anton) (?Bruno)", with the parentheses around Anton because the original assignment (to Agenus) was modified (to Agenus?) by Bruno. This practice is not included in the International Code of Zoological Nomenclature, and is used only by paleontologists.

== In fungal taxonomy ==
In fungal taxonomy, incertae sedis is applied to taxa whose position in the hierarchy cannot be stated with confidence. For much of the discipline's history, classification rested on morphology, and naming rules were periodically revised; changes to the ICNafp adopted "one fungus, one name" and other measures to stabilise usage. DNA-based systematics, including multi-gene barcoding and model-based phylogenetics, has driven large rearrangements at genus, family, and order ranks. Even so, a sizeable residue of genera remains unplaced, including many that are morphologically well circumscribed and still listed as incertae sedis in major indexes such as Species Fungorum and MycoBank. Causes include limited taxon sampling, discordant signals from different genetic markers, missing links between sexual and asexual morphs, and cases where a taxon simply does not match any recognised family or order.

Progress is often slowed by practical constraints. Type material can be old, fragmentary, or inaccessible; loans from fungaria have tightened under biodiversity and quarantine rules, and the lack of living ex-type cultures hampers sequencing. Where fresh collections are possible, epitypes may be designated, although cautiously, since epitypification can be set aside only by formal conservation under the ICNafp. The scale of the backlog is substantial: the 2022 "Outline of Fungi and fungus-like taxa" reported about 3,185 genera as incertae sedis, including roughly 2,680 in Ascomycota (around 1,477 of them not placed to any family or order) and about 420 in Basidiomycota, with smaller numbers in other groups. Continued recollection and molecular study are needed to place these taxa and to refine the fungal tree of life.

== See also ==
- Glossary of scientific naming
- Nomen dubium, a name of unknown or doubtful application
- Species inquirenda, a species that in the opinion of the taxonomist requires further investigation
- Wastebasket taxon
- Sui generis (biology)
- Unclassified language
