= Metallogenium =

Scientific classification
- Domain: Bacteria
- Kingdom: incertae sedis
- Genus: Metallogenium; Perfilev & Gabe, 1961

Type species
- Metallogenium personatum Perfilev & Gabe, 1961

Genus of bacteria

Metallogenium is a proposed genus of bacteria that has an affinity to form star-shaped manganese oxide minerals. The organism is supposedly observed in fresh water (limnic) environments. The genus is currently not assigned to any taxonomic family.

The bacterium is often likened to a modern analogue of the ~1.9 Ma fossil Eoastrion in respect to similar stellate aggregations. However, an evolutionary link between the two is not yet known as the earliest dated Metallogenium specimens come from the Cretaceous, so this is likely due to convergent evolution.
