= Paradinandra =

Paradinandra Temporal range: Santonian–Campanian

Scientific classification
- Kingdom: Plantae
- Clade: Tracheophytes
- Clade: Angiosperms
- Clade: Eudicots
- Clade: Asterids
- Order: Ericales
- Family: incertae sedis
- Genus: †Paradinandra; Schöneberger & Friis
- Species: †P. suecica

Binomial name
- †Paradinandra suecica Schöneberger & Friis

Extinct genus of flowering plants

Paradinandra is a genus of fossil plants from the Cretaceous of Sweden. Its only species is Paradinandra suecica. The genus and species were described in 2001 and given an uncertain family placement within the order Ericales.

== Description ==
The flowers of P. suecica are less than 3.5 millimetres (0.14 in) long, which is typical for fossil flowers from the Cretaceous. The flowers are organised into whorls of five parts. The sepals are free, lanceolate, and have an obtuse tip. They bear trichomes along the median vein, and become much thinner away from the thickened centre. The petals are thought to be fused together, at least at their bases; they are shaped like a bishop's mitre. Each flower has 15 stamens, which may also be united at the base, and taper towards the attachment of the anther. The filaments of the outer whorl of five stamens are 0.75 mm (0.030 in) long, while those of the inner whorl are around either 0.45 mm (0.018 in) or 0.55 mm (0.022 in) long. This results in the anthers falling into three distinct layers in the bud. It is not known whether the difference is retained on flowering. Pollen grains found associated with the flowers are 10–14 micrometres (0.00039–0.00055 in) long, and appear to be tricolpate, which is a characteristic of the eudicots. The gynoecium bears three styles, and the ovules are curved.

== Biostratigraphy ==
The specimens of Paradinandra had been naturally fusainised (turned into charcoal), and were recovered by sieving sand and clay. The deposits are thought to be of Late Santonian to Early Campanian age, and are located in a former kaolin quarry owned by Höganäs AB near Näsum, Skåne, Sweden (56°9′N 14°30′E). The specimens were described by Jürg Schöneberger and Else Marie Friis in 2001 in the American Journal of Botany, and have been deposited at the Swedish Museum of Natural History.

== Taxonomy ==
In their original description, Schöneberger and Friis noted that the flowers had few features which would allow them to determine the relationships of Paradinandra to other plants. The stamen arrangement seen in Paradinandra and the curved ovules are both seen in various families within the Ericales (sensu lato), and some families, such as Ternstroemiaceae (now included in Pentaphylacaceae), show both. This suggests that closest relatives of Paradinandra are found among the order Ericales, but the authors could not assign the fossil to any single family, and therefore assigned it incertae sedis (of uncertain placement) within the order.

A 2020 phylogenetic analysis of a wide range of fossil angiosperm flowers found that P. suecica could be part of an early lineage of Ericales that might have become extinct later. However, its floral features were also found in some other eudicot clades, and it could also be placed outside Ericales in the analysis.
