= Microvictoria =

Microvictoria Temporal range: 93.9–89.8 Ma Turonian, late Cretaceous

Scientific classification (disputed)
- Kingdom: Plantae
- Clade: Tracheophytes
- Clade: Angiosperms
- Order: Nymphaeales
- Family: Nymphaeaceae
- Genus: †Microvictoria; Nixon, Gandolfo & Crepet
- Species: †M. svitkoana

Binomial name
- †Microvictoria svitkoana Nixon, Gandolfo & Crepet

Fossil species of aquatic plant

Microvictoria svitkoana is a fossil species of aquatic plant, which occurred in the Cretaceous period of New Jersey, USA.

== Description ==
=== Generative characteristics ===
The pedunculate, actinomorphic flowers are 2.3-3.4 mm long, and 1.2-1.6 mm wide. The peduncle is 0.4-1.8 mm long. Both staminoids and fertile stamens are present.

== Taxonomy ==
=== Publication ===
It was published by Maria Alejandra Gandolfo, Kevin C. Nixon, and William L. Crepet in 2004.

=== Type specimen ===
The type specimen was collected in the Old Crossman Clay Pit, Sayreville, New Jersey, USA.

=== Position within Nymphaeales ===
It is placed in the family Nymphaeaceae. This placement has been questioned by different authors, who believe it may be placed outside of the order Nymphaeales. It has been proposed to include it in a newly described family Microvictoriaceae Doweld with a possible affinity to the order Illiciales.

== Etymology ==
The generic name Microvictoria expresses an affinity to the extant genus Victoria. The specific epithet svitkoana honours Jennifer L. Svitko, a lab technician of the Cornell University.

== Ecology ==
=== Pollination ===
It was pollinated by insects.
