= Umm Irna Formation =

Late Permian geological formation in Jordan

- Stratigraphic range: Late Permian
- Type: Geological formation
- Unit of: Permian–Triassic succession of the Dead Sea region
- Underlies: Ma'in Formation
- Overlies: Unconformably overlies Umm Ishrin Sandstone
- Thickness: 60–85 m (197–279 ft)

Lithology
- Primary: Claystone, siltstone, sandstone
- Other: Mudstone, shale, minor coal

Location
- Coordinates: 31.3°N 35.55°E
- Region: Dead Sea region
- Country: Jordan
- Extent: Eastern margin of the Dead Sea

Type section
- Named by: Bandel & Khoury
- Location: Wadi Himara
- Year defined: 1981
- Thickness at type section: 60–85 m (197–279 ft)
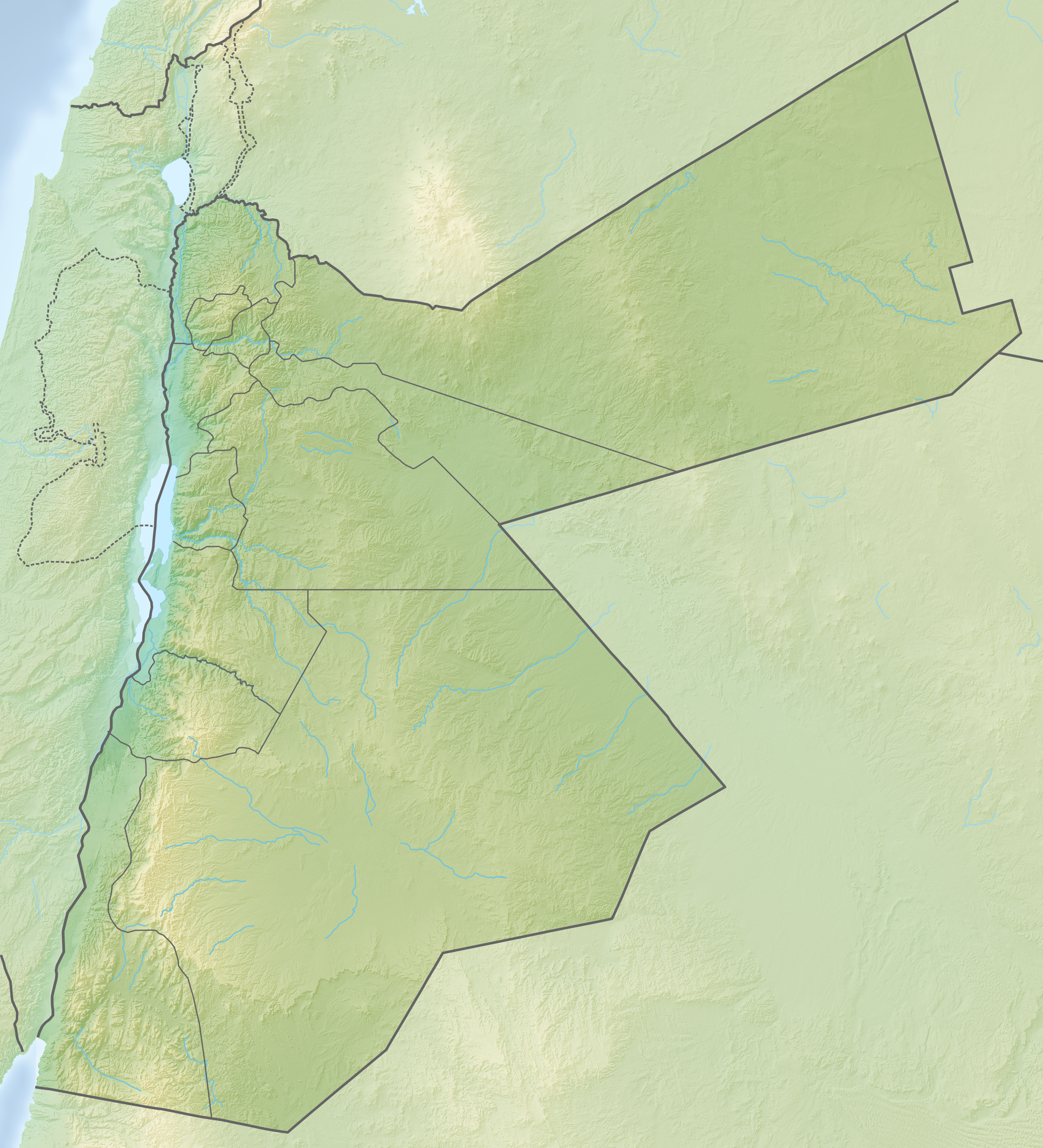
- Umm Irna Formation (Jordan)

The Umm Irna Formation (also spelled Um Irna Formation) is a Late Permian geological formation exposed along the eastern margin of the Dead Sea in Jordan. It consists predominantly of sandstone, siltstone, claystone and shale, with locally organic-rich beds and thin, immature coals. The formation represents a continental alluvial plain crossed by braided and low-sinuosity rivers and containing floodplains, abandoned channels, shallow lakes, ponds and peaty wetlands.

The formation is probably Changhsingian in age and is separated by major erosional surfaces from the much older Cambrian Umm Ishrin Sandstone below and the Early Triassic Ma'in Formation above.

The Umm Irna Formation is particularly important for palaeobotany. Its exceptionally preserved plant assemblages contain some of the earliest known representatives of several plant groups that became widespread during the Mesozoic, including corystosperms, cycads and bennettitaleans. The flora is consequently important for understanding the origins of vegetation that later characterised much of the Triassic world.

== History and definition ==
The Umm Irna Formation was formally defined by Bandel and Khoury in 1981 from exposures at Wadi Himara on the eastern side of the Dead Sea. Its type succession has variously been measured at approximately 60 to 85 metres (197 to 279 ft), reflecting differences in the sections examined and the definition of its boundaries.

The formation crops out discontinuously in wadis and fault-bounded exposures along the eastern Dead Sea margin. Subsequent faulting has locally preserved the Permian–Triassic succession within small horsts and grabens.

== Stratigraphy ==
The Umm Irna Formation rests unconformably upon the Cambrian Umm Ishrin Sandstone, producing a substantial hiatus in the local sedimentary record. The uppermost Umm Ishrin strata consist predominantly of quartz-rich sandstone with subordinate siltstone and mudstone, whereas the base of the Umm Irna succession marks the return of continental sedimentation during the Permian.

The formation is itself overlain by the Lower Triassic Ma'in Formation. The boundary represents a major change from predominantly continental alluvial sedimentation to shallow-marine deposition associated with an Early Triassic marine transgression. The Permian–Triassic boundary is thought to occur either within a depositional hiatus represented by the sequence boundary between the two formations or within approximately 15 metres (49 ft) of the basal shallow-marine beds of the Ma'in Formation. At Wadi Himara, the Umm Irna Formation has traditionally been divided into approximately six fining-upward sedimentary cycles. These generally begin with erosively based sandstone and grade upwards into finer-grained siltstone, claystone or shale.

== Lithology ==
The formation is a heterogeneous siliciclastic succession dominated by sandstone, siltstone, claystone and silty shale. Sandstones range from fine- to coarse-grained and locally contain quartz and feldspar granules or small pebbles. Channel sandstones commonly have scoured erosional bases and contain medium- to large-scale trough cross-bedding. Makhlouf et al. (1991) divided the approximately 60 metres (200 ft) succession they examined into two principal fluvial facies. The lower interval contains five sandstone-dominated fining-upward sequences consisting of erosively based coarse- to fine-grained trough-cross-bedded sandstone overlain by maroon siltstone and silty shale. Carbonaceous plant material is locally abundant.

The upper interval contains as many as five additional fining-upward sequences. These begin with coarse, locally pebbly sandstone and grade upwards through finer sandstone and siltstone into silty shale. Sandstone bodies in this interval are generally thicker and more laterally persistent than those below and contain abundant ferruginous concretions or glaebules. The finer-grained floodplain deposits include conspicuous red beds, while organic-rich grey to dark-grey claystones and siltstones occur in former channels, ponds and wetland environments. Thin immature coal seams and seatearth horizons occur locally.

== Depositional environment ==
The Umm Irna Formation records deposition on a broad continental alluvial plain near the southern margin of the Neo-Tethys Ocean. Sediment was transported predominantly northwestwards from elevated source areas associated with the Arabian-Nubian Shield to the south and southeast. Early interpretations emphasised deposition on an unconfined braidplain. More detailed sedimentological work has demonstrated a more varied fluvial system. Channel deposits include stacked small-scale braided channels as well as larger low-sinuosity to locally higher-sinuosity channels containing point bar deposits. These channels migrated across extensive floodplains containing crevasse splays, abandoned channels, oxbow lakes, shallow ponds, peaty backswamps and other wetland environments.

Floodplain areas not permanently waterlogged underwent extensive pedogenesis, producing red beds and iron-rich palaeosols. Ferruginous glaebules are particularly common in parts of the upper formation and have been interpreted as products of soil-forming and diagenetic processes above a fluctuating groundwater table. The fluvial system ultimately drained northwestwards towards a shallow marine basin along the southern margin of the Neo-Tethys. Although deposition of the formation itself was overwhelmingly continental, proximity to the sea may have exerted a maritime influence on the regional climate.

== Palaeoclimate ==
Sedimentary structures, palaeosols and fossil plants indicate a warm, seasonally variable tropical to subtropical climate. Ferruginous palaeosols and strong chemical leaching indicate periods of considerable moisture, whereas widespread red beds and evidence for fluctuating groundwater conditions indicate seasonal drying.

The landscape has consequently been interpreted as a tropical or subtropical seasonal alluvial plain experiencing alternating wet and dry periods. Permanently or frequently waterlogged areas supported peaty wetlands, while better-drained floodplains underwent oxidation and soil formation. Evidence of wildfire has also been recovered from the formation in the form of charcoalified fossil wood, demonstrating that vegetation was periodically burned during the Late Permian. The absence of prominent growth rings in some fossil woods has been interpreted as indicating relatively favourable local growing conditions, particularly near abandoned river channels where water remained available despite regional seasonality.

== Palaeontology ==
The Umm Irna Formation contains a diverse and exceptionally well-preserved Late Permian flora. Plant remains occur particularly in fine-grained, organic-rich siltstones and claystones deposited in abandoned channels and other low-energy environments. The preservation of leaves with intact cuticles has made the formation particularly valuable for studying the morphology and systematic relationships of Permian plants. The assemblage is unusual because it combines plant groups traditionally associated with different Late Palaeozoic floristic provinces and includes lineages more commonly associated with younger Mesozoic vegetation.

=== Flora ===
Among the most significant discoveries is the presence of the corystosperm foliage genus Dicroidium. Corystosperms became among the most characteristic seed plants of the southern continents during the Triassic, particularly across Gondwana. Their occurrence in the Late Permian of Jordan demonstrates that the lineage originated before the Permian–Triassic mass extinction and considerably farther north than its subsequently dominant Gondwanan distribution. The formation also preserves probable early cycad foliage comparable with Ctenis, together with bennettitalean remains. These discoveries suggest that several major components of later Mesozoic floras had already evolved in tropical lowlands before the end of the Permian.

Conifer remains are also present. Some material was initially suggested to represent an exceptionally early occurrence of the modern conifer family Podocarpaceae, but subsequent reassessment has regarded its affinity with that family as uncertain. Other components of the flora include noeggerathialeans, gigantopterids, lyginopterids and possible ginkgophytes. A fossil pollen organ attributed to the Lyginopteridales has also been described from the formation.

=== Palynology ===
The formation contains diverse fossil spore and pollen assemblages that provide important evidence for its age and regional correlation. Palynological assemblages support a Late Permian, probably Changhsingian, age and permit correlation with Permian successions elsewhere on the Arabian Plate, including strata in Saudi Arabia and Oman. Palynomorph assemblages vary according to depositional environment. Organic-rich abandoned-channel deposits and other fine-grained facies generally provide the most productive samples, whereas oxidised red-bed deposits tend to contain fewer well-preserved palynomorphs.

More recent palynological work has confirmed that the formation records a heterogeneous fluvial landscape containing small braided channels, larger higher-sinuosity channels, floodplains, crevasse splays, oxbow lakes and peaty backswamps.

== Palaeogeographic significance ==
During the Late Permian, Jordan lay at low palaeolatitudes near the southern margin of the Neo-Tethys rather than in the high-latitude regions of Gondwana traditionally associated with many Permian seed-plant groups. The Umm Irna flora therefore provides evidence that tropical lowlands played an important role in the early diversification of several plant lineages that subsequently became prominent during the Mesozoic.

The discovery of Dicroidium and other characteristically Mesozoic plant groups in the formation has altered interpretations of their evolutionary history. Rather than first appearing after the Permian–Triassic extinction event, some of these lineages were already established in tropical ecosystems during the latest Permian and survived the extinction into the Triassic. The Umm Irna Formation also provides a record of environmental conditions immediately preceding the largest mass extinction of the Phanerozoic. Its position directly below the Lower Triassic Ma'in Formation makes the Dead Sea succession important for studying regional environmental changes across the Permian–Triassic transition.

== See also ==
- Geology of Jordan
- Permian–Triassic extinction event
- Palaeobotany
- Dicroidium
- Arabian-Nubian Shield
- Tethys Ocean
