= Plant secretory tissue =

The tissues that are concerned with the secretion of gums, resins, volatile oils, nectar latex, and other substances in plants are called secretory tissues. These tissues are classified as either laticiferous tissues or glandular tissues.

== Introduction ==
Cells or organizations of cells produce a variety of secretions. These secreted substances may remain deposited within the secretory cell itself or may be excreted, that is, released from the cell. Substances can be excreted to the surface of the plant or into intercellular cavities or canals. Some of the many substances contained in the secretions are not further utilized by the plant (resins, rubber, tannins, and various crystals), while others take part in the functions of the plant (enzymes and hormones). Secretory structures range from single cells scattered among other kinds of cells to complex structures involving many cells; the latter are often called glands.

Epidermal hairs of many plants are secretory or glandular. Such hairs commonly have a head composed of one or more secretory cells borne on a stalk. The hair of a stinging needle is bulbous below and extends into a long, fine process above. If one touches the hair, its tip breaks off, the sharp edge penetrates the skin, and the poisonous secretion is released. Glands secreting a sugary liquid—the nectar—in flowers pollinated by insects are called nectaries. Nectaries may occur on the floral stalk or on any floral organ: sepal, petal, stamen, or ovary.

The hydathode structures discharge water—a phenomenon called guttation through openings in margins or tips of leaves. The water flows through the xylem to its endings in the leaf and then through the intercellular spaces of the hydathode tissue toward the openings in the epidermis. Strictly speaking, such hydathodes are not glands because they are passive with regard to the flow of water.

Some carnivorous plants have glands that produce secretions capable of digesting insects and small animals. These glands occur on leaf parts modified as insect-trapping structures. In the sundews ( Drosera ) the traps bear stalked glands, called tentacles. When an insect lights on the leaf, the tentacles bend down and cover the victim with a mucilaginous secretion, the enzymes of which digest the insect. See insectivorous plants.
Resin ducts are canals lined with secretory cells that release resins into the canal. Resin ducts are common in gymnosperms and occur in various tissues of roots, stems, leaves, and reproductive structures.
Gum ducts are similar to resin ducts and may contain resins, oils, and gums. Usually, the term gum duct is used with reference to the dicotyledons, although gum ducts also may occur in the gymnosperms. Oil ducts are intercellular canals whose secretory cells produce oils or similar substances. Such ducts may be seen, for example, in various parts of the plant of the carrot family (Umbelliferae). Laticifers are cells or systems of cells containing latex, a milky or clear, colored or colorless liquid. Latex occurs under pressure and exudes from the plant when the latter is cut.

== Laticiferous tissues ==
These consist of thick walled, greatly elongated and much branched ducts containing a milky or yellowish colored juice known as latex. They contain numerous nuclei which lie embedded in the thin lining layer of protoplasm. They are irregularly distributed in the mass of parenchymatous cells. Laticiferous ducts, in which latex are found are again two types-

1. Latex cell or non-articulate latex ducts
2. Latex vessels or articulate latex

=== Latex cells ===
Also called as "non-articulate latex ducts", these ducts are independent units which extend as branched structures for long distances in the plant body. They originates as minute structures, elongate quickly and by repeated branching ramify in all directions but do not fuse together. Thus a network is not formed as in latex vessels.

=== Latex vessel ===
Also called "articulate latex ducts", these ducts or vessels are the result of anastamosis of many cells. They grow more or less as parallel ducts which by means of branching and frequent anastomoses form a complex network. Latex vessels are commonly found in many angiosperm families Papaveraceae, Compositae, Euphorbiaceae, Moraceae, etc.

=== Function ===
The function of laticiferous ducts is not clearly understood. They may also act as food storage organs or as reservoir of waste products, or as translocatory tissues.

== Glandular tissues ==
This tissue consists of special structures; the glands. These glands contain some secretory or excretory products. A gland may consist of isolated cells or a small group of cells with or without a central cavity. They are of various kinds and may be internal or external.
Internal glands are

- Oil-gland secreting essential oils, as in the fruits and leaves of orange, lemon.
- Mucilage secreting glands, as in the betel leaf
- Glands secreting gum, resin, tannin, etc.
- Digestive glands secreting enzymes or digestive agents
- Special water secreting glands at the tip of veins

External glands are commonly short hairs tipped by glands. They are

- water-secreting hairs or glands,
- Glandular hairs secreting gum like substances as in tobacco, plumbago, etc.
- Glandular hairs secreting irritating, poisonous substances, as in nettles
- Honey glands, as in carnivorous plants.

== See also ==
- Vascular tissue
- Hydathode
