= Kaokoxylon =

Kaokoxylon Temporal range: 270–200 Ma

Scientific classification
- Kingdom: Plantae
- Division: Pinophyta
- Class: Pinopsida
- Order: Pinales
- Family: Araucariaceae
- Genus: Kaokoxylon Kräusel, 1956

Extinct genus of conifers

Kaokoxylon is an extinct Gondwanan genus of gymnosperms from the Permian and Triassic. Fossils assigned to the genus or its type species, Kaokoxylon zalesskyi, have been found in South America (Brazil, Argentina), India (Bengal), and Antarctica.

In Brazil fossil regions have been found in the region of the Brazilian paleopark, Paleorrota, in the city of Faxinal do Soturno on Linha São Luiz. This outcrop is located in Caturrita Formation.

== Description ==
Cells of Sclerenchyma are found isolated or in small irregular groups along of pith, without connections.
