= List of Gerridae genera =

This is a list of 56 genera in the family Gerridae, water striders.

== Gerridae genera ==
- Amemboa Esaki, 1925^{g}
- Amemboides Polhemus & Andersen, 1984^{g}
- Aquarius Schellenberg, 1800^{i c g b}
- Asclepios Distant, 1915^{g}
- Austrobates Andersen & Weir, 1994^{g}
- Brachymetra Mayr, 1865^{g}
- Brachymetroides Andersen, 2000^{g}
- Calyptobates Polhemus & Polhemus, 1994^{g}
- Chimarrhometra Bianchi, 1896^{g}
- Ciliometra Polhemus & Polhemus, 1993^{g}
- Cretogerris Perrichot, Nel & Néraudeau, 2005^{g}
- Cryptobates Esaki, 1929^{g}
- Cylindrobates Wappler & Andersen, 2004^{g}
- Cylindrostethus Fieber, 1861^{g}
- Electrobates Andersen & Poinar, 1992^{g}
- Electrogerris Andersen, 2000^{g}
- Eobates Drake & Harris, 1934^{g}
- Eotrechus Kirkaldy, 1902^{g}
- Eurygerris Hungerford & Matsuda, 1958^{g}
- Gerris Fabricius, 1794^{i c g b}
- Gerrisella Poisson, 1940^{d}
- Gigantometra (China, 1925)^{d}
- Halobates Eschscholtz, 1822^{i c g b}
- Iobates Polhemus & Polhemus, 1993^{g}
- Lathriobates Polhemus, 2004^{g}
- Limnogonus Stål, 1868^{i c g b}
- Limnometra Mayr, 1865^{g}
- Limnoporus Stål, 1868^{i c g b}
- Lutetiabates Wappler & Andersen, 2004^{g}
- Metrobates Uhler, 1871^{i c g b}
- Metrobatopsis Esaki, 1926^{g}
- Metrocoris Mayr, 1865^{g}
- Naboandelus Distant, 1910^{g}
- Neogerris Matsumura, 1913^{i c g b}
- Onychotrechus Kirkaldy, 1903^{g}
- Ovatametra Kenaga, 1942^{g}
- Palaeogerris Andersen, 1998^{g}
- Pleciobates Esaki, 1930^{g}
- Potamobates Champion, 1898^{g}
- Potamometropsis Lundblad, 1933^{g}
- Pseudohalobates J.Polhemus & D.Polhemus, 1996^{g}
- Ptilomera Amyot & Serville, 1843^{g}
- Rhagadotarsus Breddin, 1905^{g}
- Rhagodotarsus Breddin, 1905^{g}
- Rheumatobates Bergroth, 1892^{i c g b}
- Rheumatometroides Hungerford & Matsuda, 1958^{g}
- Rhyacobates Esaki, 1923^{g}
- Stenobates Esaki, 1927^{g}
- Stenobatopsis J.Polhemus & D.Polhemus, 1996^{g}
- Stygiobates Polhemus & Polhemus, 1993^{g}
- Succineogerris Andersen, 2000^{g}
- Tachygerris Drake, 1957^{g}
- Telmatometra Bergroth, 1908^{g}
- Telmatometroides J.Polhemus, 1991^{g}
- Telmatrechus Scudder, 1890^{g}
- Tenagogerris Stål, 1853^{d}
- Tenagogonus Stål, 1853^{g}
- Tenagometra Poisson, 1949^{d}
- Tenagometrella Poisson, 1958
- Thetibates Polhemus & Polhemus, 1996^{g}
- Trepobates Uhler, 1883^{i c g b}

Data sources: i = ITIS, c = Catalogue of Life, g = GBIF, b = Bugguide.net, d = Damgaard et al. 2014
