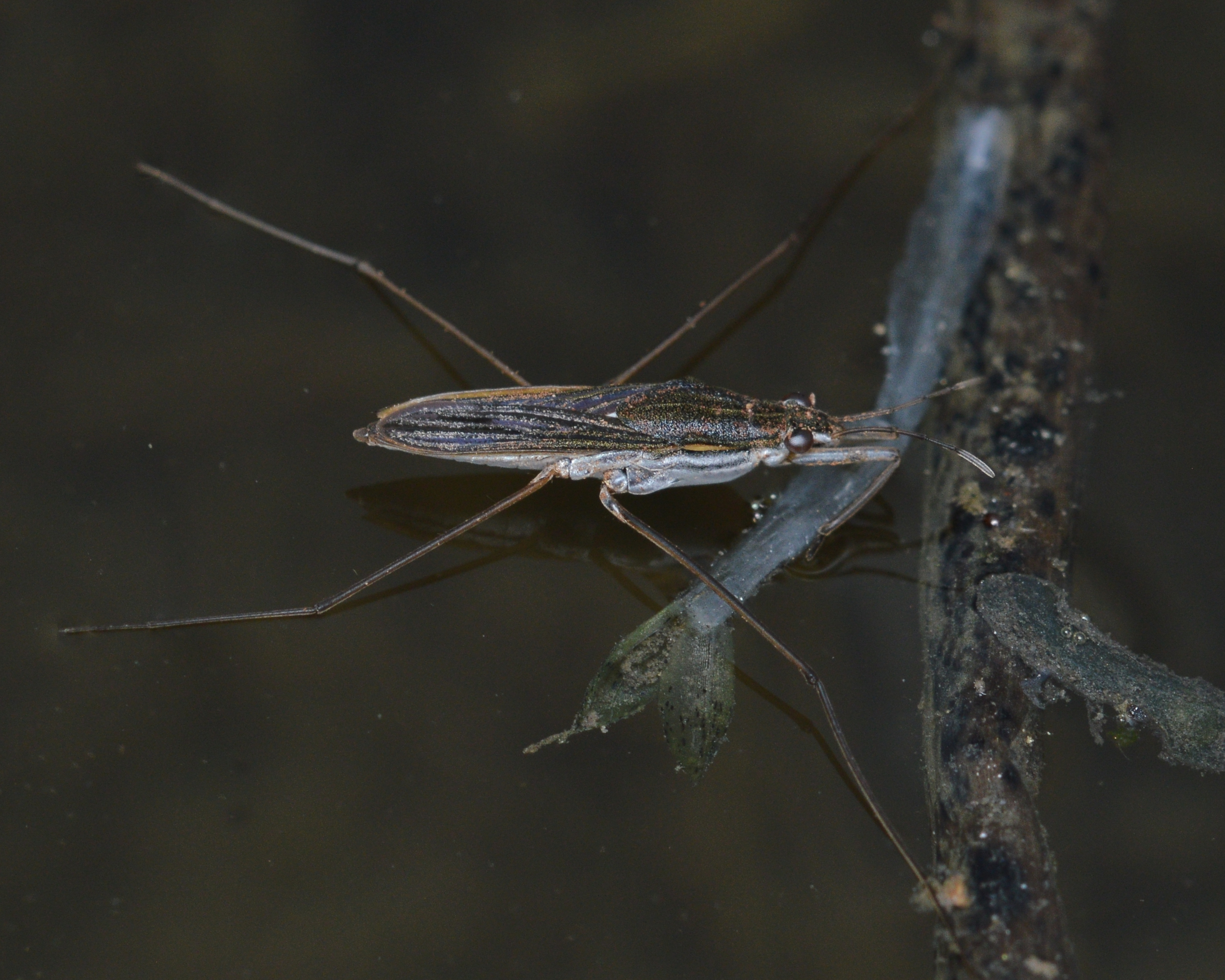
- Gerris sp.

Scientific classification
- Kingdom: Animalia
- Phylum: Arthropoda
- Clade: Pancrustacea
- Class: Insecta
- Order: Hemiptera
- Suborder: Heteroptera
- Family: Gerridae
- Subfamily: Gerrinae
- Tribe: Gerrini; Amyot and Serville, 1843

= Gerrini =

Tribe of true bugs

Gerrini is a tribe of water striders containing over 160 species in 12 genera.

== Genera ==
- Aquarius Schellenberg, 1800
- Gerris Fabricius, 1794
- Gerrisella Poisson, 1940
- Gigantometra Hungerford & Matsuda, 1958
- Limnogonus Stål, 1868
- Limnometra Mayr, 1865
- Limnoporus Stål, 1868
- Neogerris Matsumura, 1913
- Tenagogerris Hungerford & Matsuda, 1958
- Tenagogonus Stål, 1853
- Tenagometra Poisson, 1949
- Tenagometrella Poisson, 1958
- † Telmatrechus (Eocene, Ypresian) Scudder, 1890
