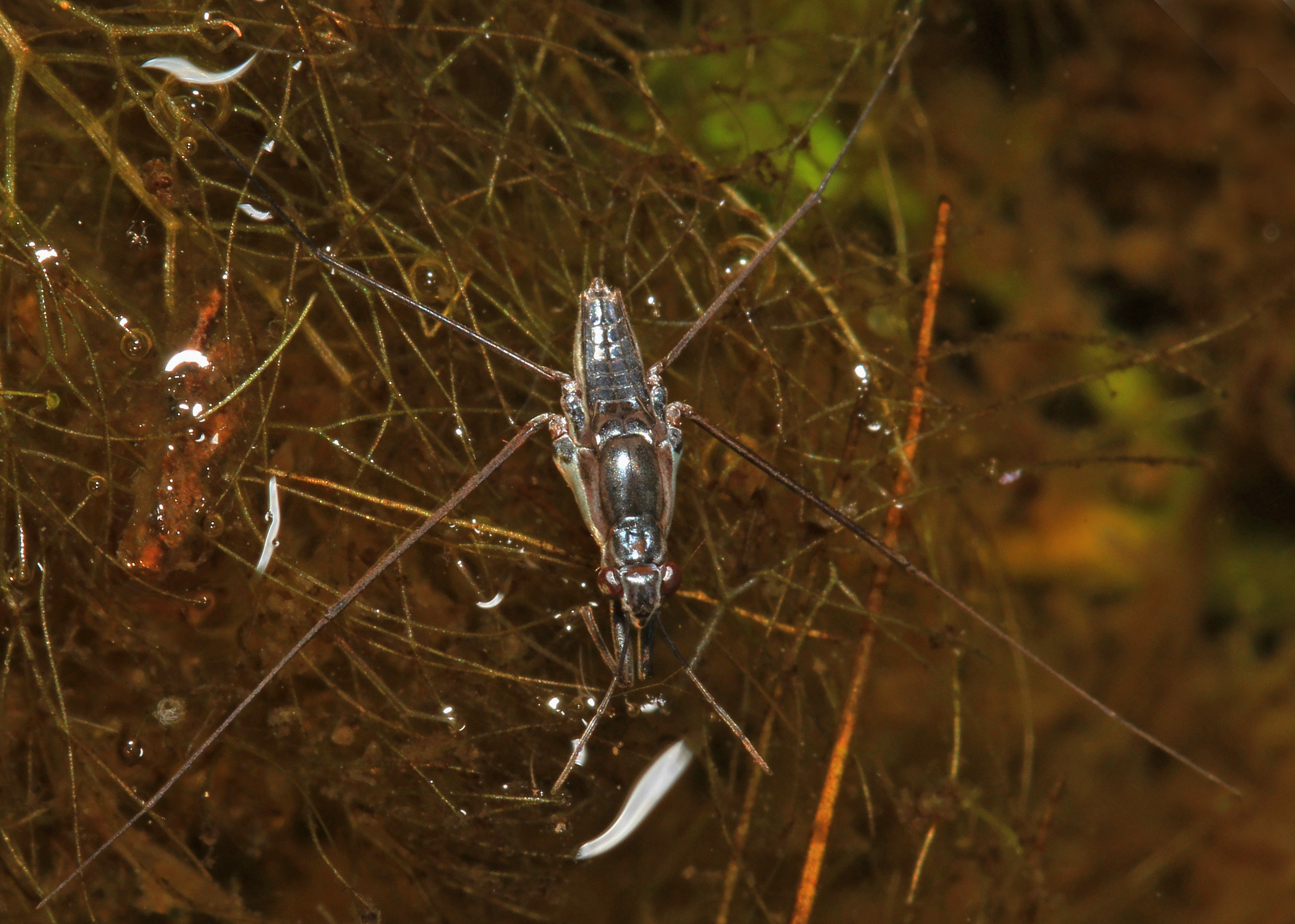

Scientific classification
- Domain: Eukaryota
- Kingdom: Animalia
- Phylum: Arthropoda
- Class: Insecta
- Order: Hemiptera
- Suborder: Heteroptera
- Family: Gerridae
- Subfamily: Gerrinae
- Genus: Neogerris
- Species: N. hesione

Binomial name
- Neogerris hesione (Kirkaldy, 1902)

= Neogerris hesione =

Species of true bug

Neogerris hesione is a species of water strider in the family Gerridae. It is found in the Caribbean, Central America, and North America.
