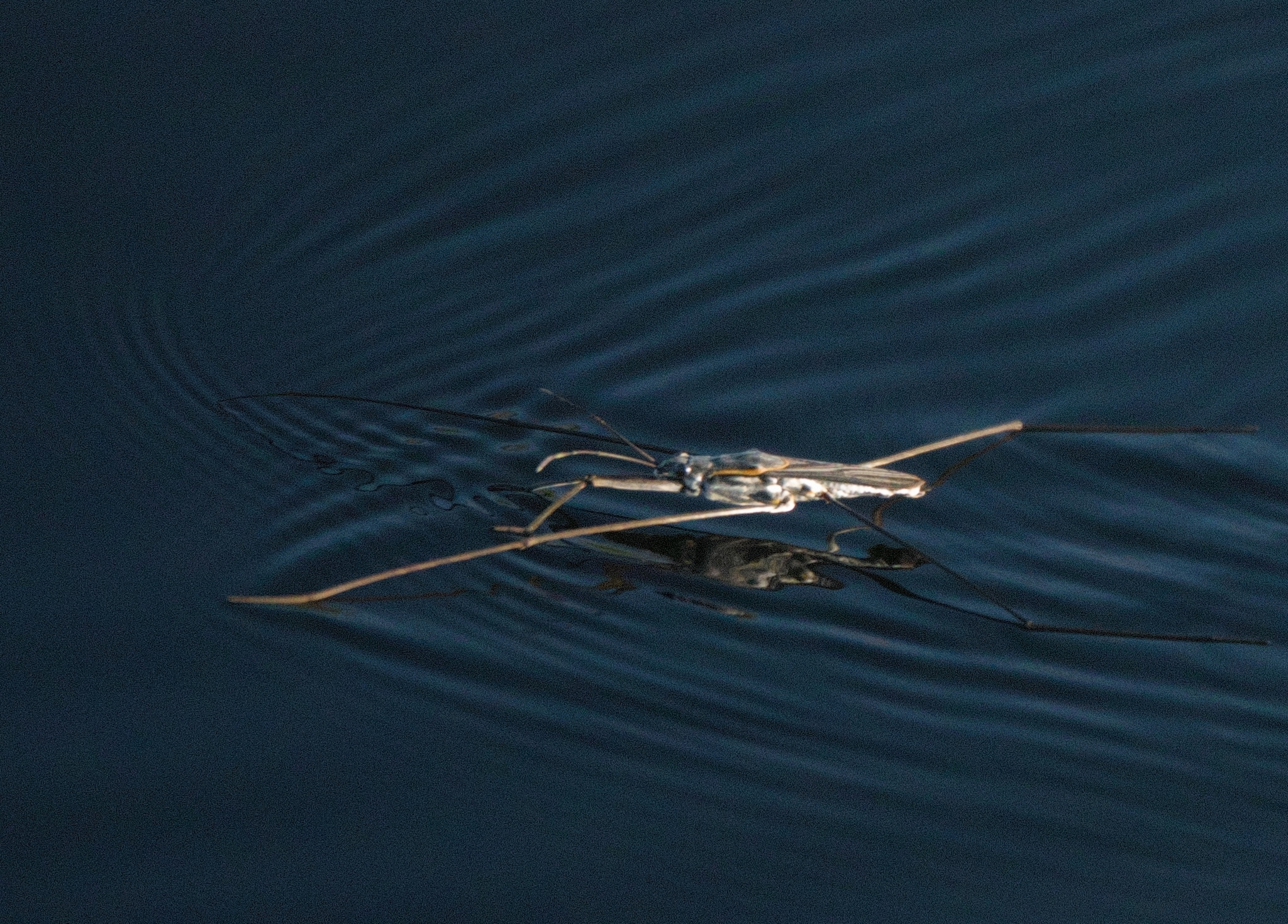
- Aquarius distanti, Botswana

Scientific classification
- Kingdom: Animalia
- Phylum: Arthropoda
- Class: Insecta
- Order: Hemiptera
- Suborder: Heteroptera
- Family: Gerridae
- Tribe: Gerrini
- Genus: Aquarius
- Species: A. distanti

Binomial name
- Aquarius distanti (Horváth, 1899)

Synonyms
- Aquarius stappersi (Poisson, 1950)

= Aquarius distanti =

Species of true bugs

Aquarius distanti is a species of water strider in the family Gerridae. It is found in southern Africa.
