= Tachygerrini =

Scientific classification
- Domain: Eukaryota
- Kingdom: Animalia
- Phylum: Arthropoda
- Class: Insecta
- Order: Hemiptera
- Suborder: Heteroptera
- Family: Gerridae
- Subfamily: Gerrinae
- Tribe: Tachygerrini; Andersen, 1975

Genera
- Eurygerris Hungerford & Matsuda, 1958; Tachygerris Drake, 1957

Tribe of true bugs

Tachygerrini is a tribe of water striders containing 21 species in 2 genera. In addition to the two extant genera, Eurygerris and Tachygerris, Andersen included the extinct genus Eurygerris within the Tachygerrini.

== Genera ==
- Eurygerris
- Tachygerris
