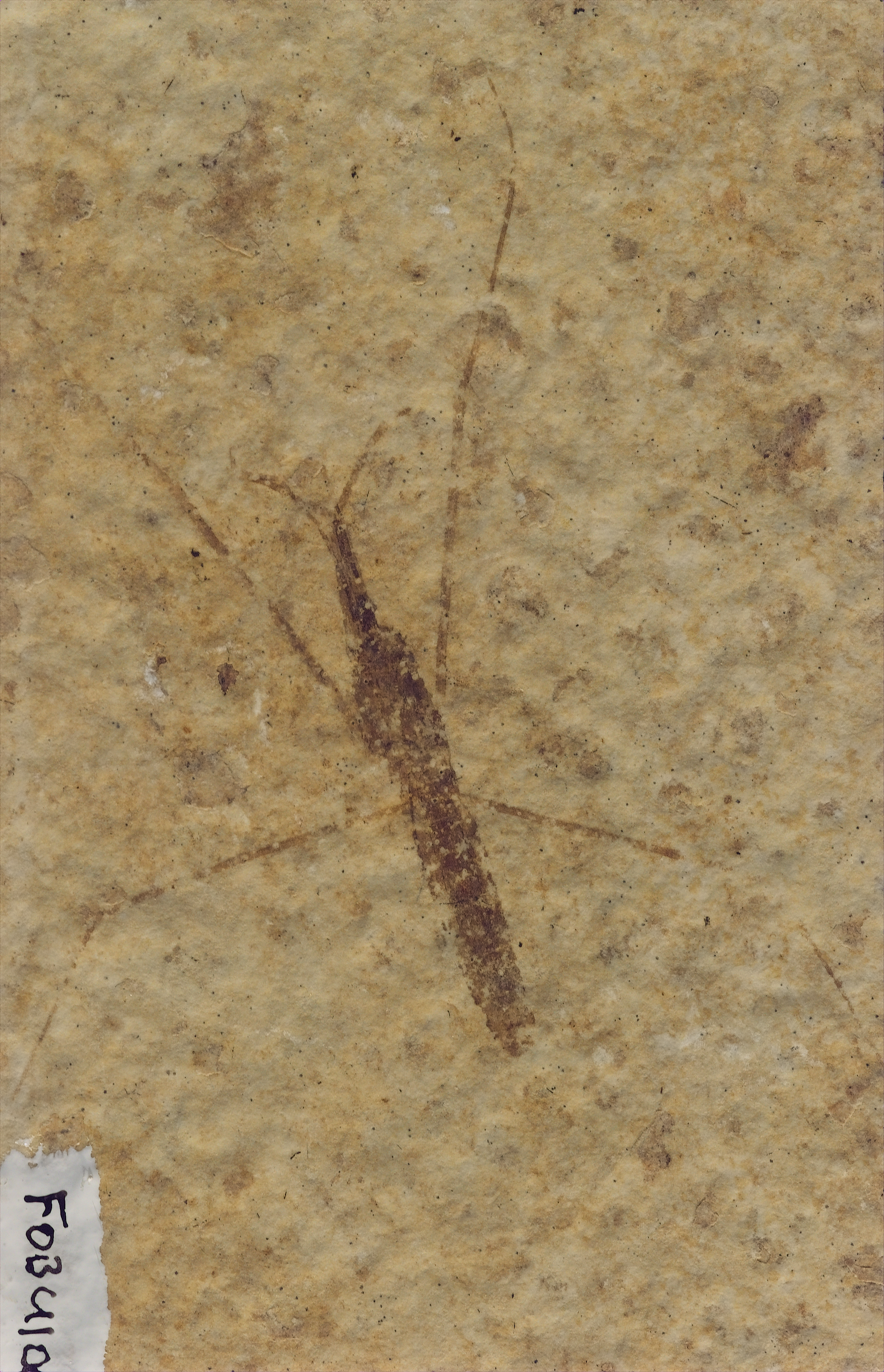
- Telmatrechus parallelus Fossil Lake, Green River Formation

Scientific classification
- Kingdom: Animalia
- Phylum: Arthropoda
- Clade: Pancrustacea
- Class: Insecta
- Order: Hemiptera
- Suborder: Heteroptera
- Family: Gerridae
- Subfamily: Gerrinae
- Genus: †Telmatrechus; Scudder, 1890

Type species
- Hygrotrechus stali

Species
- T. defunctus; T. parallelus; T. stali

Synonyms
- T. defunctus synonymy: Gerris defuncta Handlirsch, 1910; T. stali synonymy: Hygrotrechus stali Scudder, 1879; Gerris stali (Scudder, 1879)

= Telmatrechus =

Telmatrechus Temporal range: Ypresian 52.5–48 Ma

Extinct Genus of true bugs

Telmatrechus is an extinct heteropteran genus in the water strider family Gerridae which is solely known from Early Eocene sediments exposed in western North America. The genus contains three described species, the type species Telmatrechus parallelus, plus Telmatrechus defunctus, and Telmatrechus stali. The genus has been considered closest to remigis-group species of the living Aquarius, which are all confined to the Nearctic.

== Distribution and age ==
Fossils of Telmatrechus are found in early Eocene, Ypresian age lacustrine deposits in two areas of Western North America. Both the type species, Telmatrechus stali and the third species to be described Telmatrechus defunctus come from sites in the Eocene Okanagan Highlands. T. stali has only been reported from an outcrop of the Allenby Formation on the North Fork of the Similkameen River near Princeton, British Columbia. T. defunctus was collected nearly 30 years later by the Lawrence M. Lambe expedition of 1906 as it passed through the Quilchena, British Columbia area and collected from outcrops of the Coldwater Beds.

Early estimates of the highlands sites ranged from Miocene to Eocene in age. The age of the Allenby Formation was debated for many years, with fish and insect fossils hinting at an Eocene age, while mammal and plant fossils suggested a Late Oligocene or Early Miocene age. The lake sediments at Princeton were radiometrically dated using the K-Ar method in the 1960s based on ash samples exposed in the lake bed. These samples yielded an age of ~48 million years ago; however, dating published in 2005 provided a ^{40}Ar-^{39}Ar radiometric date placing some Princeton sites at 52.08 ± 0.12 million years ago. A report using dating of detrital zircon crystals from several of the southern highlands lake beds consistently reaffirmed ages in the Late Ypresian, with dates oldest likely ages between 53 to 51.2 million years ago.

The remaining species, Telmatrechus parallelus was first described from the "Twin Buttes" locality of Fossil Lake in 1890. Later in 1984, additional specimens were reported from the Laney Members "G-1, Fontenelle Reservoir" outcrop which is included in Lake Uinta. Both the Fossil Butte and Laney members are included in the Green River Formation.

The Fossil Butte Member of the Green River Formation represents the smallest and shortest-lived of the three prehistoric lake systems that make up the Green River Formation, the other two paleolakes being Lake Unita and Lake Gosiute. The lake sediments include a volcanic ash dating to 51.66 million years ago, during the Early Eocene. Fossils are abundant in the rocks of Fossil Lake, and illustrate a diverse assemblage of plants, bivalves, snails, crustaceans, insects, rays, bony fish, salamanders, turtles, lizards, snakes, crocodilians, birds, and mammals. The ages of the Fossil Lake and Lake Unita are Eocene, but are encompassing different sections. The older Fossil Butte sediments are considered Early Eocene, and overlap the Okanagan Highlands Ypresian dating. In contrast the Laney member is placed as early to early middle Eocene and in the Bridgerian.

== History and classification ==
The first species to be described was named by Samuel H. Scudder (1879) from material recovered by the George M. Dawson expedition through British Columbia in the 1870s. Scudder placed the new species into the genus "Hygrotrechus" and coined the specific epithet stali as a patronym to honor Swedish entomologist Carl Stål, a prolific studier of hemipterans and friend of Scudders who died that same year. The genus Telmatrechus was first defined and named by Scudder in his 1890 monograph The Tertiary insects of North America which he had been compiling for several years. Scudder noted the newly coined genus name as a combination of the Greek language words τέλμα (télma), meaning "quagmire", and τρέχω (trécho), meaning "run". Scudder did not designate either of the two species described at the time as the type species, choosing to move Hygrotrechus stali into the genus and name another species without comment. Based on a group of four fossils from the recently discovered Green River Formation outcrops at Twin Creek, Wyoming. Unlike both the first species and the genus, Scudder did not opt to provide a specified reasoning for choosing the species name "parallelus", though he specifically noted how remarkably almost "perfectly parallel" the majority of the abdomen sides are. The final species was not named until 1910 when Austrian paleontologist Anton Handlirsch was loaned a group of British Columbian fossils for description. While working on the fossils, he formed the opinion that Scudders genus Telmatrechus was "not well founded" and indicating that he considered T. stali as the type species. He chose to instead place T. stali into Gerris but did not address at all the placement of T. parallelus. With a specimen from Quilchena deemed distinct enough from T. stali, Handlirsch described the new species G. defuncta though he did not provide and an etymology.

The inclusion of the British Columbian species in Gerris while the Green River species was left Telmatrechus remained unchallenged for close to 90 years. A comprehensive review of the know fossil water-striders and their close relatives was conducted by Nils Møller Andersen (1998), in which he addressed the placements of all three species in question. Anderson upheld the validity of Telmatechus as a genus based on the differences that Scudder also noted. As such he moved T. stali back into the genus, and also deemed Handlirschs species as part of the genus, pacing it as Telmatrechus defuncta. The validity of the genus was again questioned a decade later in Jakob Damgaards 2008 evaluation of Gerromorpha evolution and fossil history. Taking a middle of the road approach between Scudder and Handlirsch, he noted that the three species shared a number of characters with the remigis-species group in genus Aquarius. Species of the genus, which Scudder's referenced Hygrotrechus is a junior synonym of, were called notably similar to the extinct species, and he raised the possibility they were congeners of the remigis-species group. He did not, however, take the full steps to formally synonymize the genera or move the species.

== Description ==
cudder erected the genus based on characters of the antennae, head, leg proportions, and abdomen. The genus diagnosis was updated by Andersen (1998) described the genus as being of large adult striders which have a body length between 15.0–19.8 mm (9/16–3/4 in) long and having both apterous and macropterous forms. The bodies are elongated and yet are more robustly built than species of Limnoporus or †Palaeogerris. While Scudder only suggested one of the abdominal connexivum was modified into a spine, likened to that of "Limnotrechus", Andersens definition included all of the connexiva as modified spines. The antennae are at most equal to half the body length, often shorter and composed of three segments. The individual segments of the antennae are elongated, though segments two and three are less in combined length to segment one, which is 1.3 times longer than the head. Segment three is additionally shorter than segment two. This supports Scudders original diagnosis of the first antennal segment being longer than the second. The middle and hind femorae are nearly equal to each other in length while the front femora is described as "robust". The middle tibiae are just about the same length as, or a little shorter than the middle femorae. The pronotum is an elongated lobe with a rear marginal area thats broadly rounded. Scudder also deemed the eyes to be not very prominent on the head, and the thorax to be generally shorter than in "Hygrotrechus". Andersen noted that if the points held as consistent, the antennal proportions separate Telmatrechus from Aquarius, while the leg proportions distinguish it from Limnoporus.

=== Telmatrechus defunctus ===
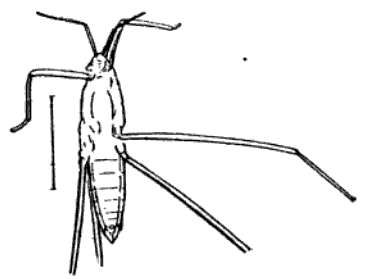
1910 illustration Telmatrechus defunctus

The two reported specimens, 1910 and 1988, for Telmatrechus defunctus both have an approximately 15 mm (9/16 in) long body, and are both wingless adults. The head is an equilateral triangle in shape, with only slightly protruding eyes and a length of 1.6 mm (1/16 in). The antennae are at least 4.4 mm (3/16 in) long, with the 1910 specimen being reported with the first and third segments of similar length. The 1988 specimen has possibly incomplete antennae as the third segment is as less than half the length of either other segments. The head and thorax are proportionally longer than the abdomen, and have a pronotum that is about 4.5 mm (3/16 in) and is slightly wider than the abdomen. The 9 mm (3/8 in) long abdomen is just under 2 1/2 times longer than its widest point near its base. On the sides of at least the 7th segment are spine like corners formed by the connexival join. The middle legs are the longest, with a femora of 10–11 mm (3/8–7/16 in), and a tibia over 8 mm (5/16 in) long. The front legs are shorter, having femurs and tibiae of only 3.8 mm (1/8 in) and 3.3 mm (1/8 in).

=== Telmatrechus parallelus ===
Telmatrechus parallelus is larger than T. defunctus, but of similar length to T. stali, with an estimated length from the two 1890 specimens of 20 mm (13/16 in). Scudder called out the nearly parallel sides of the abdomen in T. parallelus as the most notable distinguishing feature of the species. This feature was questioned by Andersen, who suggested the profile of the abdomens was a preservational artifact, and the laterotergites on the sides were simply missing. As preserved the abdomens are comparable to the thorax width until the last two abdominal segments where they narrow further. The individual middle abdomen sections are equally wide as long, in contrast to those of T. stali, where the segments are half as long as wide. The head is described as shorter than that of T. stali and notably smaller than the 2.75 mm (1/8 in) wide thorax. Scudder described the coloration of the specimens as fairly uniform "brick" tone, with a course or rough exoskeleton texture on both head and thorax.

=== Telmatrechus stali ===
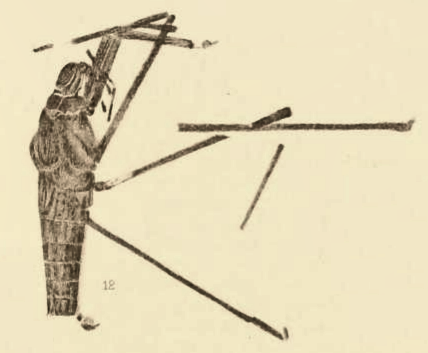
1890 illustration Telmatrechus stali

This species was based on two adult specimens and a possible immature individual, which Scudder noted might belong to Metrobates instead. While the species was initially considered to be of similar length to the living Aquarius remigis, Anderson notes that that species only reaches an upper length of 16 mm (5/8 in), while the adult T. stali fossils are the larger 19.75 mm (3/4 in) long. The head is only visible in side view, but appears to be rounded in outline rather than the triangular of T. defunctus and larger than in T. parallelus with an estimated length of 1.5 mm (1/16 in). The antennae are nearly as long as the total thorax and head length of 6.5 mm (1/4 in), but the individual segments were not listed. Similarly the eyes are noted to be not prominent on the head, but dimensions or shape are not given. Both the thorax and the abdomen have a finely course or roughened exoskeleton like that seen in T. parallelus. The thorax has a width of 1.75 mm (1/16 in) at the base of head from where it then narrows informally and rapidly to the rear margin where its 3.5 mm (1/8 in), with a total length of 5 mm (3/16 in). The rear margin of the prostornum on the abdominal side is described as "distinct", with a noted depression on each side near the front coxae. The abdomen also tapers from front edge to rear tip, and like the other species abdomen segment six has distinct connexival spines, with a length reaching at least to the middle of the next abdominal segment, if not longer. The middle abdominal segments are noted to be twice as wide as they are long. The hindmost abdominal segment of at least one specimen shows distinct proctiger and the gonapophyses for mating. Scudder initially identified the structures as "stout lappets". Scudder described the dorsally preserved specimen as showing faint lines passing across the middle coxae and down across the first and second abdominal segments, along with some smaller faint cross lines. All of the lines disappear before the fourth abdominal segment starts. This was interpreted as the remains of full wings, which only extended across half the abdominal length and the longest of the lines being from the claval suture. In the specimen preserved laterally, the punative wings extend possibly as far down as the sixth abdominal segment.

== Paleoenvironment ==
Orange line showing the Eocene gulf coast shoreline

The Republic sites are part of a larger fossil site system collectively known as the Eocene Okanagan Highlands. The highlands, including the Early Eocene formations between Driftwood Canyon at the north and Republic at the south, have been described as one of the "Great Canadian Lagerstätten" based on the diversity, quality and unique nature of the paleofloral and paleofaunal biotas that are preserved. The highlands temperate biome preserved across a large transect of lakes recorded many of the earliest appearances of modern genera, while also documenting the last stands of ancient lines. The warm temperate highland floras in association with downfaulted lacustrine basins and active volcanism are noted to have no exact modern equivalents. This is due to the more seasonally equitable conditions of the Early Eocene, resulting in much lower seasonal temperature shifts. However, the highlands have been compared to the upland ecological islands of the Virunga Mountains within the African rift valleys Albertine Rift.

Both Okanagan Highlands formations represent upland lake systems that were surrounded by a warm temperate ecosystem with nearby volcanism dating from during and just after the early Eocene climatic optimum. The highlands likely had a mesic upper microthermal to lower mesothermal climate, in which winter temperatures rarely dropped low enough for snow, and which were seasonably equitable. The paleoforest surrounding the lakes have been described as precursors to the modern temperate broadleaf and mixed forests of Eastern North America and Eastern Asia. Based on the fossil biotas the lakes were higher and cooler then the coeval coastal forests preserved in the Puget Group and Chuckanut Formation of Western Washington, which are described as lowland tropical forest ecosystems. Estimates of the paleoelevation range between 0.7–1.2 km (0.43–0.75 mi) higher than the coastal forests. This is consistent with the paleoelevation estimates for the lake systems, which range between 1.1–2.9 km (1,100–2,900 m), which is similar to the modern elevation 0.8 km (0.50 mi), but higher.

Estimates of the mean annual temperature have been derived from climate leaf analysis multivariate program (CLAMP) analysis of the Princeton paleoflora, and leaf margin analysis (LMA) of both the Princeton and Quilchena paleofloras. The CLAMP results after multiple linear regressions for Princeton gave a mean annual temperature of approximately 5.1 °C (41.2 °F), with the LMA giving 5.1 ± 2.0 °C (41.2 ± 3.6 °F). LMA results from Quilchena returned the higher 14.8 ± 2.0 °C (58.6 ± 3.6 °F), higher than seen at Republic, and CLAMP analysis gave an overall mean annual temperature of 12.8 ± 1.2 °C (55.0 ± 2.2 °F). A bioclimatic-based estimate based on modern relatives of the taxa found at each site suggested mean annual temperatures around 13.1 ± 3.1 °C (55.6 ± 5.6 °F) for Princeton and 15.0 ± 0.6 °C (59.0 ± 1.1 °F) for Quilchena. These are lower than the mean annual temperature estimates given for the coastal Puget Group, which is estimated to have been between 15–18.6 °C (59.0–65.5 °F). The bioclimatic analysis for Princeton and Quilchena suggest mean annual precipitation amounts of 114 ± 42 cm (45 ± 17 in) and 126 ± 28 cm (50 ± 11 in) respectively.

The Green River basin during the early Eocene was subjected to climate forces from both the west and south-east. The young Rocky Mountain ranges were continuing to slowly rise, with the Sevier orogeny finishing around 50 million years ago and overlapping with the Laramide orogeny happening during the same period and finishing around 55 million years ago. These mountain building events presenting a moisture barrier on the western side of the Green River area, and formed the large depositional basin the paleolakes would form in. At the same time in the early Eocene the Mississippi embayment extended much further north and westwards, placing the gulf coast shoreline much closer to the Green River basin. The proximity allowed for the North American monsoon to provide a much heavier influence on the region. Mean annual temperature of the Green River Formation has been reported as approximately 17 °C (63 °F), and subject to distinct warm and cold seasons, with warm season temperatures in the 28–35 °C (82–95 °F) range. The overall climate was subtropical, with an estimated Mean Annual Precipitation around 80 cm (31 in), with areas of evaporite deposition on saline lake conditions in older sediments of the formation indicating seasonally dryer conditions transitioning to a more uniform wetter climate regime.
