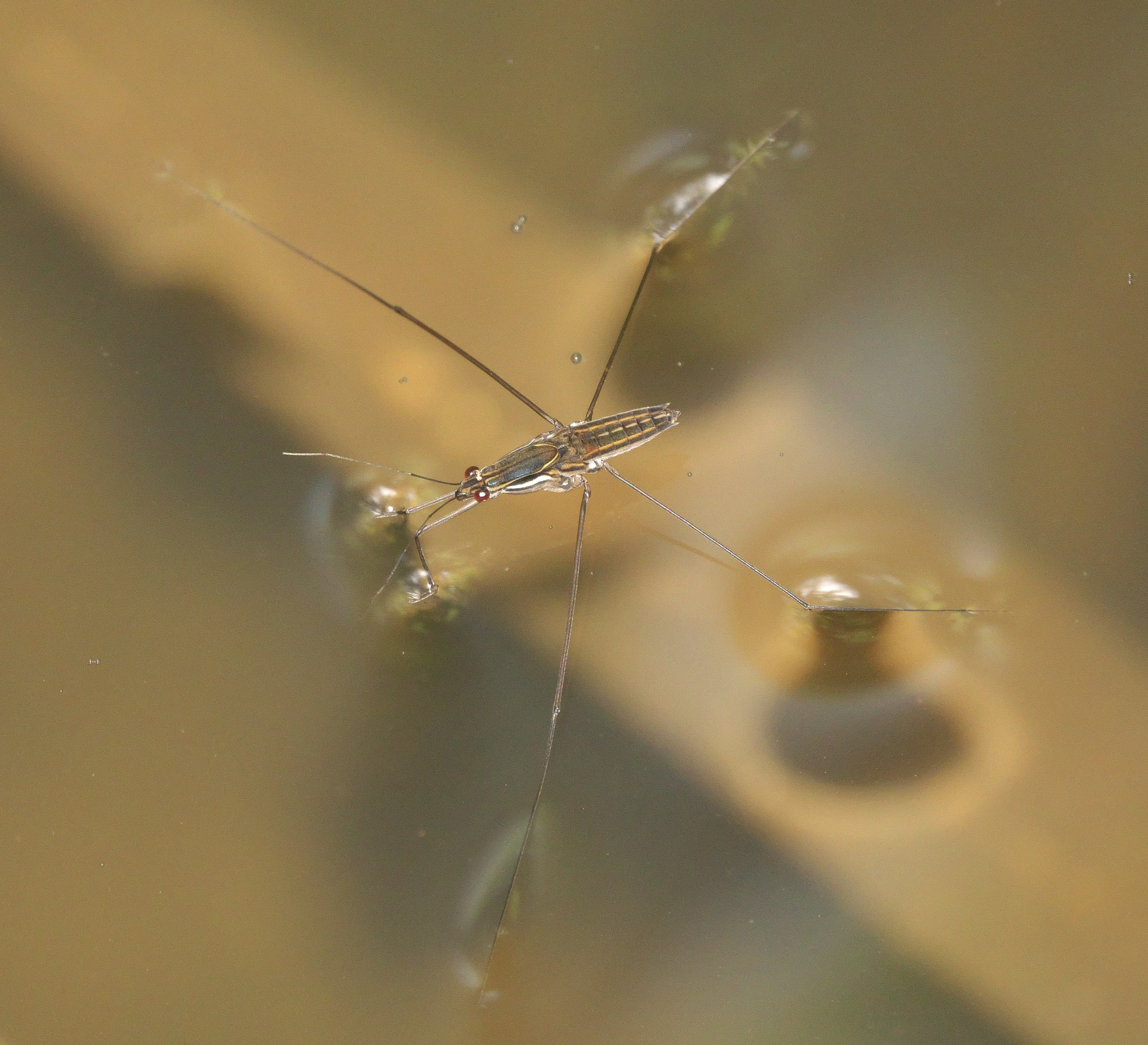
- Limnometra, Fiji

Scientific classification
- Domain: Eukaryota
- Kingdom: Animalia
- Phylum: Arthropoda
- Class: Insecta
- Order: Hemiptera
- Suborder: Heteroptera
- Family: Gerridae
- Subfamily: Gerrinae
- Tribe: Gerrini
- Genus: Limnometra; Mayr, 1865

= Limnometra =

Genus of insects

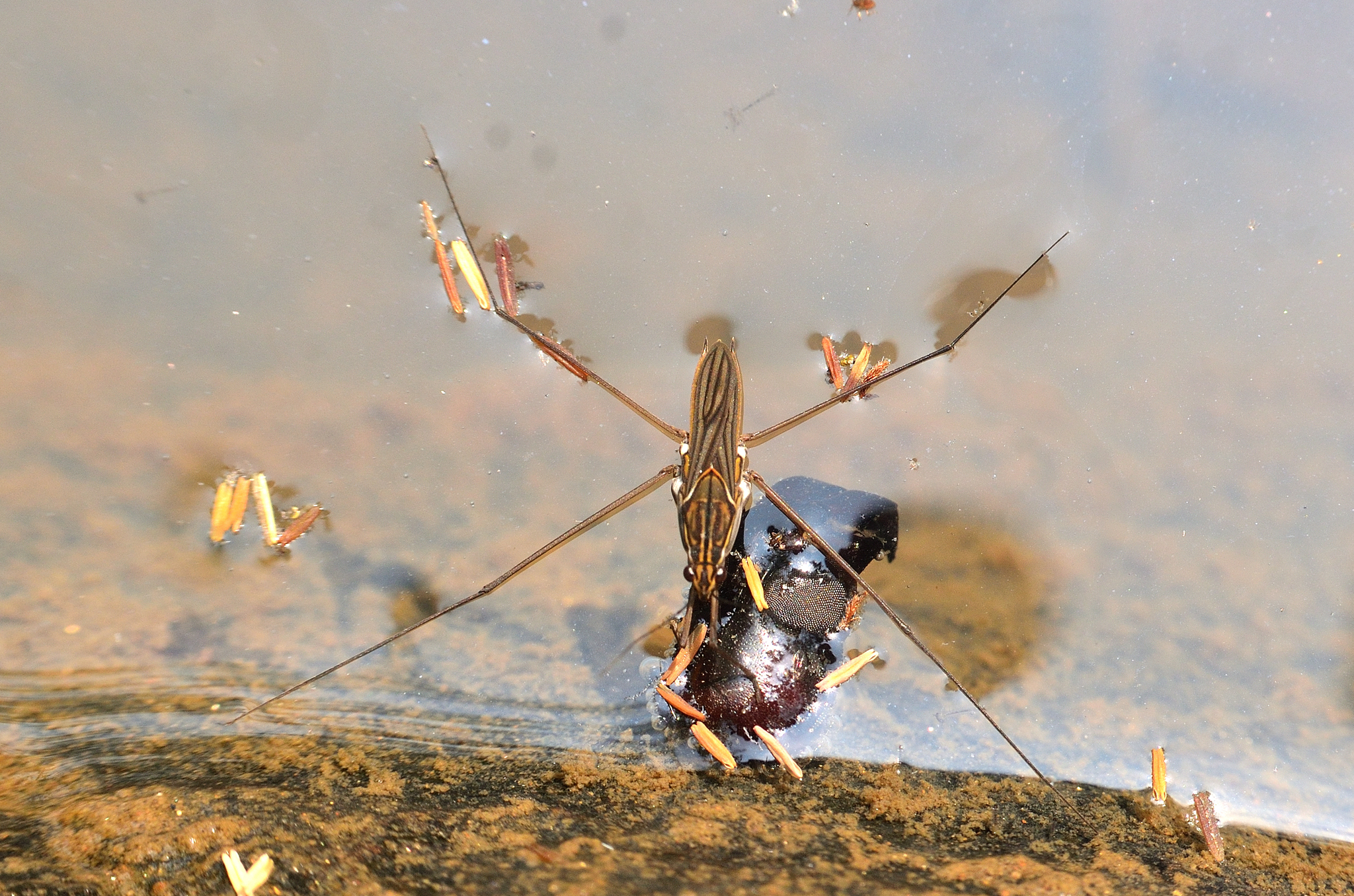
Limnometra, India

Limnometra is a genus of water striders in the family Gerridae. There are more than 30 described species in Limnometra found in Indomalaya and Oceania.

== Species ==
These 39 species belong to the genus Limnometra:

- Limnometra anadyomene (Kirkaldy, 1901)
- Limnometra annulicornis (Breddin, 1901)
- Limnometra aploa Nieser & Chen, 1992
- Limnometra arachnis Nieser & Chen, 1992
- Limnometra borneensis Hungerford & Matsuda, 1958
- Limnometra bruneiensis (Miyamoto, 1967)
- Limnometra ciliata Mayr, 1865
- Limnometra ciliodes Andersen & Weir, 1997
- Limnometra cursitans (Fabricius, 1775)
- Limnometra distanti (Gupta, Kumari & Sharma, 2011)
- Limnometra faracii Zettel, 2007
- Limnometra femorata Mayr, 1865
- Limnometra fluviorum (Fabricius, 1798)
- Limnometra freitagi Zettel, Yang & Tran, 2009
- Limnometra genitalis Nieser & Chen, 1992
- Limnometra grallator D. Polhemus & J. Polhemus, 1997
- Limnometra hysterema Nieser & Chen, 1992
- Limnometra insularis Hungerford & Matsuda, 1958
- Limnometra kallisto (Kirkaldy, 1899)
- Limnometra lepta Nieser & Chen, 1992
- Limnometra lipovskyi Hungerford & Matsuda, 1958
- Limnometra matsudai (Miyamoto, 1967)
- Limnometra mayanki (Gupta & Chaturvedi, 2010)
- Limnometra melanochroa Nieser & Chen, 1992
- Limnometra minuta Mayr, 1865
- Limnometra monochroma Nieser & Chen, 1992
- Limnometra nigripennis Mayr, 1865
- Limnometra octopunctata Hungerford, 1955
- Limnometra palauana Esaki, 1925
- Limnometra palawanensis Zettel & Chen, 2000
- Limnometra pseudoinsularis Nieser & Chen, 1992
- Limnometra pulchra Mayr, 1865
- Limnometra rossi Hungerford & Matsuda, 1958
- Limnometra skalei Zettel, 2011
- Limnometra spinosa Zettel, 2002
- Limnometra submarginalis (Miyamoto, 1967)
- Limnometra thirumalaii Zettel, 2001
- Limnometra tiomanensis Zettel, Yang & Tran, 2009
- Limnometra vulpina (Breddin, 1901)
