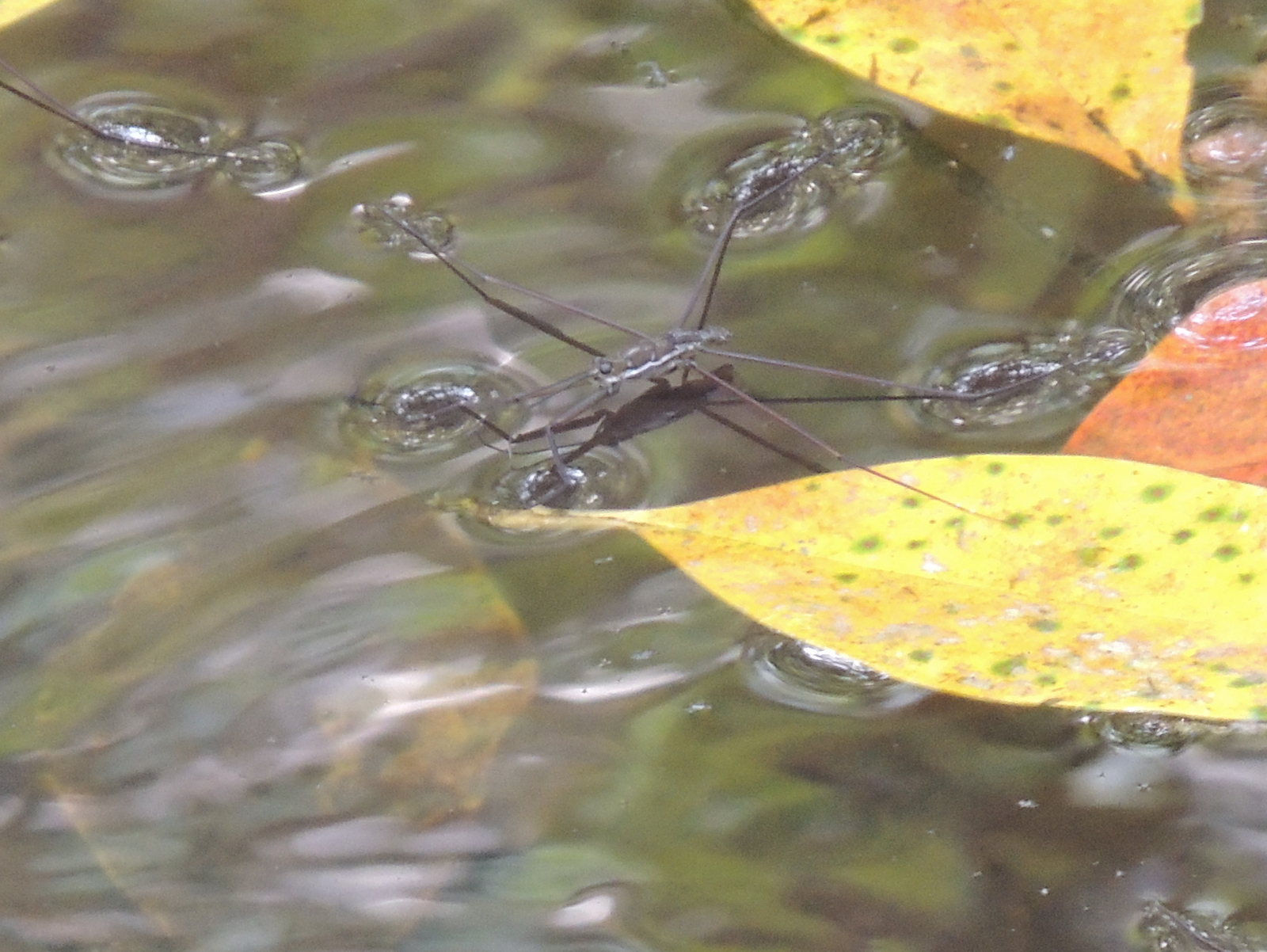
- Ptilomera sp.

Scientific classification
- Kingdom: Animalia
- Phylum: Arthropoda
- Clade: Pancrustacea
- Class: Insecta
- Order: Hemiptera
- Suborder: Heteroptera
- Family: Gerridae
- Genus: Ptilomera; Amyot & Serville, 1843

Type species
- Gerris laticaudata Hardwicke, 1823

= Ptilomera =

Genus of water strider

Ptilomera is a genus of water striders in the family Gerridae, belonging to the order Hemiptera. The genus was first described by Amyot and Serville in 1843. It comprises numerous species and includes some of the larger-bodied members of the family.

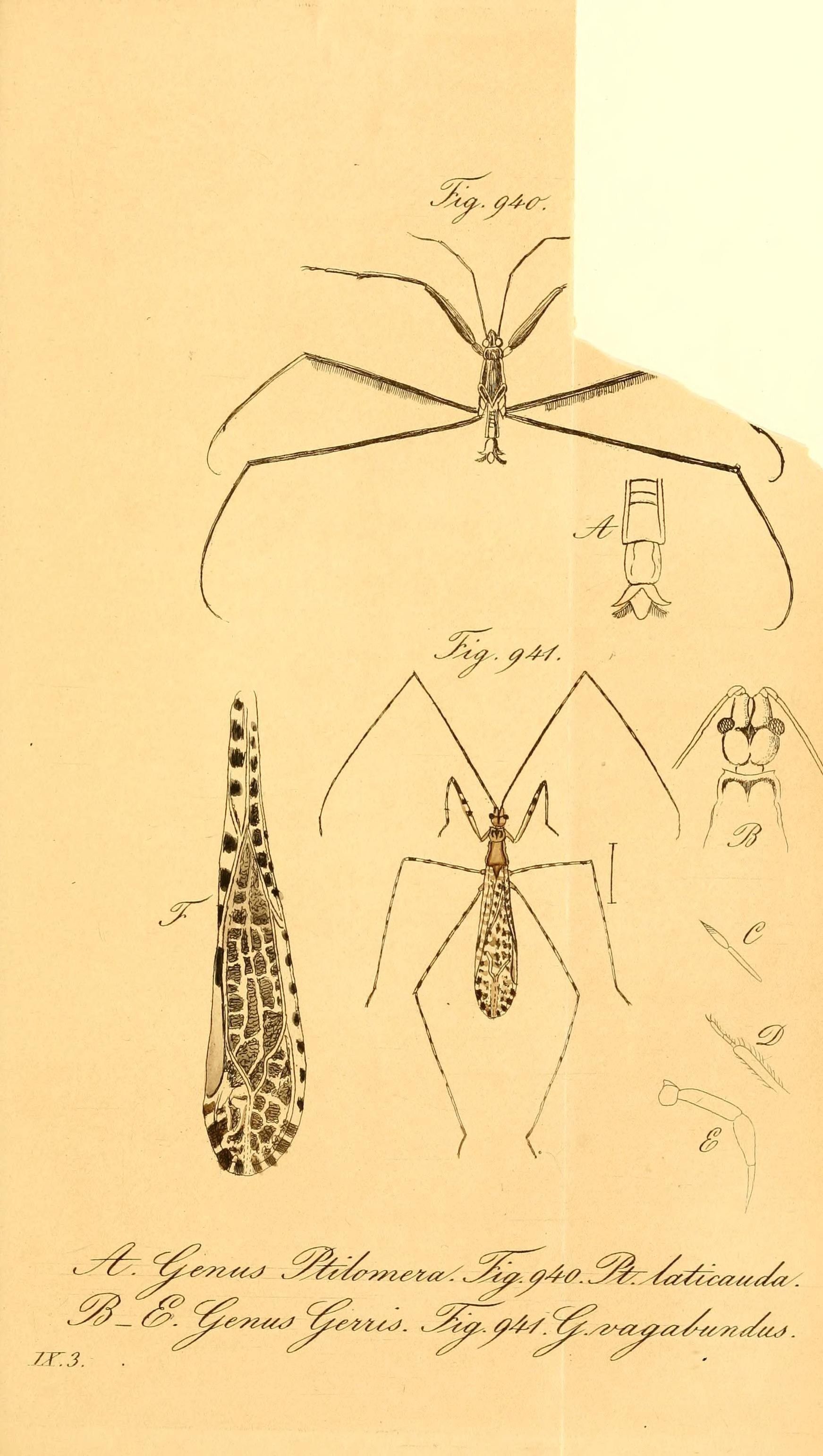
Anatomy of Ptilomera laticaudata, 1831

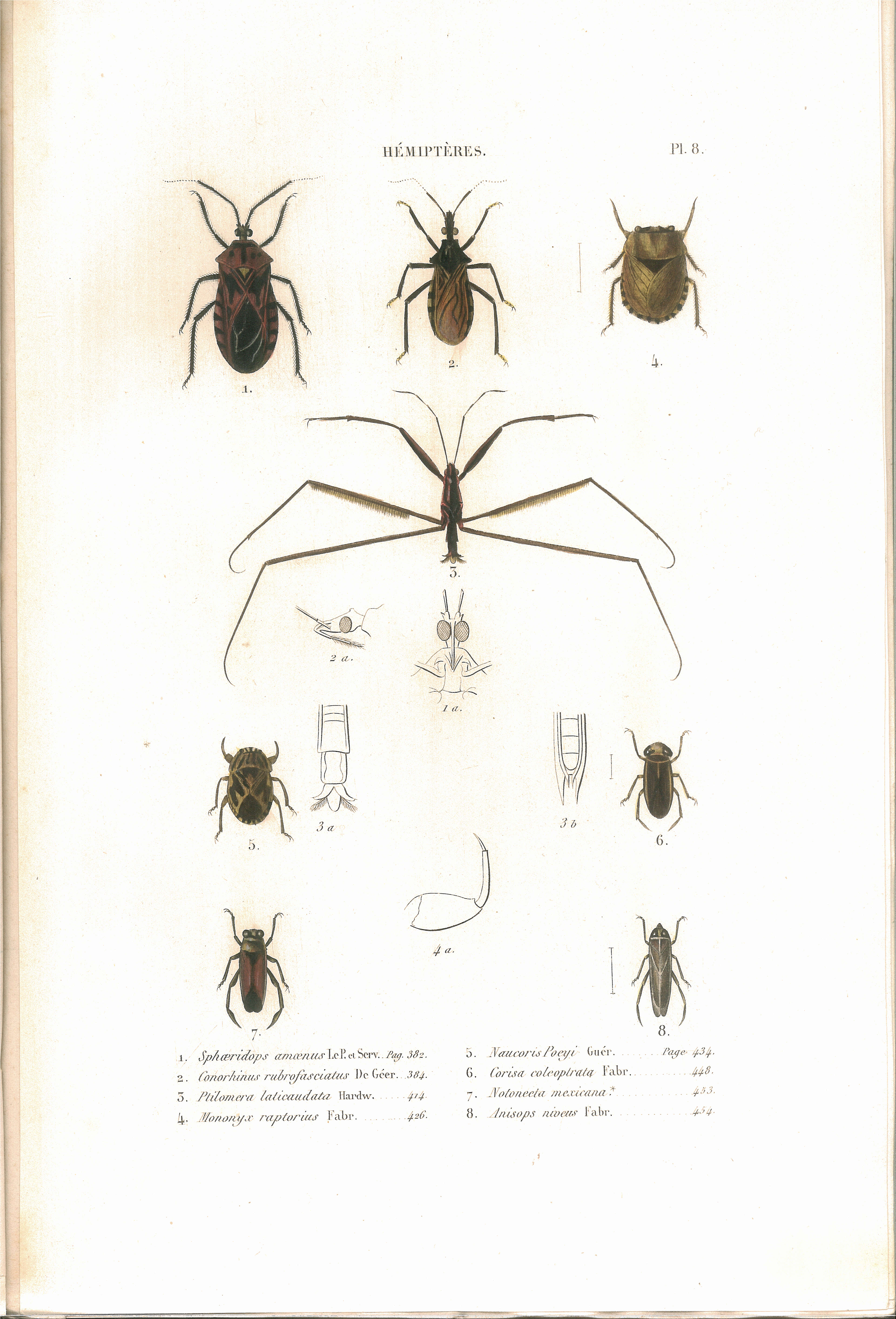
Anatomy of Ptilomera laticaudata among other insects, 1843

== Taxonomy ==
The genus Ptilomera belongs to the order Hemiptera, suborder Heteroptera, and family Gerridae, a group commonly known as water striders.

== Morphology ==
Species of Ptilomera exhibit several distinctive morphological characteristics. The hind femora are much longer than the mid femora, and the tarsal segments are fused. In males, the posterior half of the mid femora is lined with dense, woolly hairs. Male genitalia are characterised by symmetrical parameres. Females possess well-developed connexival spines on abdominal segment VII. Adults are relatively large for Gerridae, typically exceeding 15 mm (0.59 in) in body length.

Prior to 1965, distinguishing among species of Ptilomera was difficult because descriptions were largely based on colour patterns, which are often unreliable, and because of high intraspecific variation in genitalic features. In a major revision of the genus, researchers demonstrated that other male genitalic structures, particularly the pygophore, proctiger (suranal plate), and parameres, provide more reliable diagnostic characters. However, diagnostic features for females remained comparatively limited.

== Distribution ==
Ptilomera species are distributed across the Asia-Pacific region, including Southeast Asia (e.g., Malaysia, Thailand, Indonesia, and Singapore), as well as parts of Australasia (including New Guinea and nearby islands).

Species within the genus, such as Ptilomera tigrina, have been recorded in Singapore and other parts of Asia.

== Habitat and ecology ==
Members of the genus inhabit freshwater environments including streams, rivers, and ponds. Like other Gerridae, they are aquatic predators and feed primarily on small invertebrates, including spiders and insects, that fall onto the water surface.

== Behaviour ==
Ptilomera species move across the water surface using specialised locomotion that relies on surface tension. Their long legs distribute weight efficiently, preventing them from breaking the water surface. are able to stand and move on the water surface due to their low body mass and highly hydrophobic legs. Their legs and tarsi are covered with numerous microscopic hairs (microsetae) with fine grooves, which allow them to remain afloat. Other behavioural traits may include predator avoidance and mating interactions typical of water striders.

== Species ==
The following species are assigned to this genus:

- Ptilomera aello Breddin, 1906
- Ptilomera agriodes Schmidt, 1926
- Ptilomera agroides
- Ptilomera arfak D.Polhemus & J.Polhemus, 2001
- Ptilomera assamensis Hungerford & Matsuda, 1965
- Ptilomera biroi D.Polhemus & J.Polhemus, 2001
- Ptilomera bismarckensis D.Polhemus & J.Polhemus, 2001
- Ptilomera breddini Hungerford & Matsuda, 1965
- Ptilomera burmana D.Polhemus, 2001
- Ptilomera cheesmanae Hungerford & Matsuda, 1965
- Ptilomera chiasma Nieser & Chen, 1992
- Ptilomera chinai Hungerford & Matsuda, 1965
- Ptilomera cingalensis Stål, 1855
- Ptilomera dorceus Breddin, 1901
- Ptilomera dromas Breddin, 1901
- Ptilomera etna D.Polhemus & J.Polhemus, 2001
- Ptilomera fang D.Polhemus, 2001
- Ptilomera gressitti Hungerford & Matsuda, 1965
- Ptilomera harpalos Schmidt, 1926
- Ptilomera hemmingseni Andersen, 1967
- Ptilomera himalayensis Hungerford & Matsuda, 1958
- Ptilomera hungerfordi Andersen, 1967
- Ptilomera hylactor Breddin, 1903
- Ptilomera insularis D.Polhemus & J.Polhemus, 2001
- Ptilomera iriana D.Polhemus & J.Polhemus, 2001
- Ptilomera jariyae Vitheepradit & Sites, 2007
- Ptilomera jimi D.Polhemus & J.Polhemus, 2001
- Ptilomera kirkaldyi Hungerford & Matsuda, 1965
- Ptilomera kiunga D.Polhemus & J.Polhemus, 2001
- Ptilomera kra Vitheepradit & Sites, 2007
- Ptilomera kutubu D.Polhemus & J.Polhemus, 2001
- Ptilomera laelaps Breddin, 1901
- Ptilomera laticaudata (Hardwicke, 1825)
- Ptilomera lundbladi Hungerford & Matsuda, 1965
- Ptilomera maai Hungerford & Matsuda, 1965
- Ptilomera misoolensis D.Polhemus & J.Polhemus, 2001
- Ptilomera morobe D.Polhemus & J.Polhemus, 2001
- Ptilomera nagalanda Jehamalar & Chandra, 2018
- Ptilomera novabrittanica D.Polhemus & J.Polhemus, 2001
- Ptilomera nunikanensis Hungerford & Matsuda, 1965
- Ptilomera occidentalis Zettel, 2003
- Ptilomera omo D.Polhemus & J.Polhemus, 2001
- Ptilomera oribasus Breddin, 1901
- Ptilomera palawanensis D.Polhemus, 1998
- Ptilomera pamphagus Breddin, 1901
- Ptilomera papuensis Hungerford & Matsuda, 1965
- Ptilomera sarawakensis Hungerford & Matsuda, 1965
- Ptilomera schmidti Gupta & Chaturvedi, 2008
- Ptilomera sumatranus Hungerford & Matsuda, 1965
- Ptilomera sumbaensis Hungerford & Matsuda, 1965
- Ptilomera sumizome Esaki, 1925
- Ptilomera tennaserim Vitheepradit & Sites, 2007
- Ptilomera tigrina Uhler, 1860
- Ptilomera timika D.Polhemus & J.Polhemus, 2001
- Ptilomera timorensis Hungerford & Matsuda, 1965
- Ptilomera waigeo D.Polhemus & J.Polhemus, 2001
- Ptilomera wapoga D.Polhemus & J.Polhemus, 2001
- Ptilomera werneri Hungerford & Matsuda, 1958
- Ptilomera wewak D.Polhemus & J.Polhemus, 2001
- Ptilomera yapenana D.Polhemus & J.Polhemus, 2001

== Gallery ==
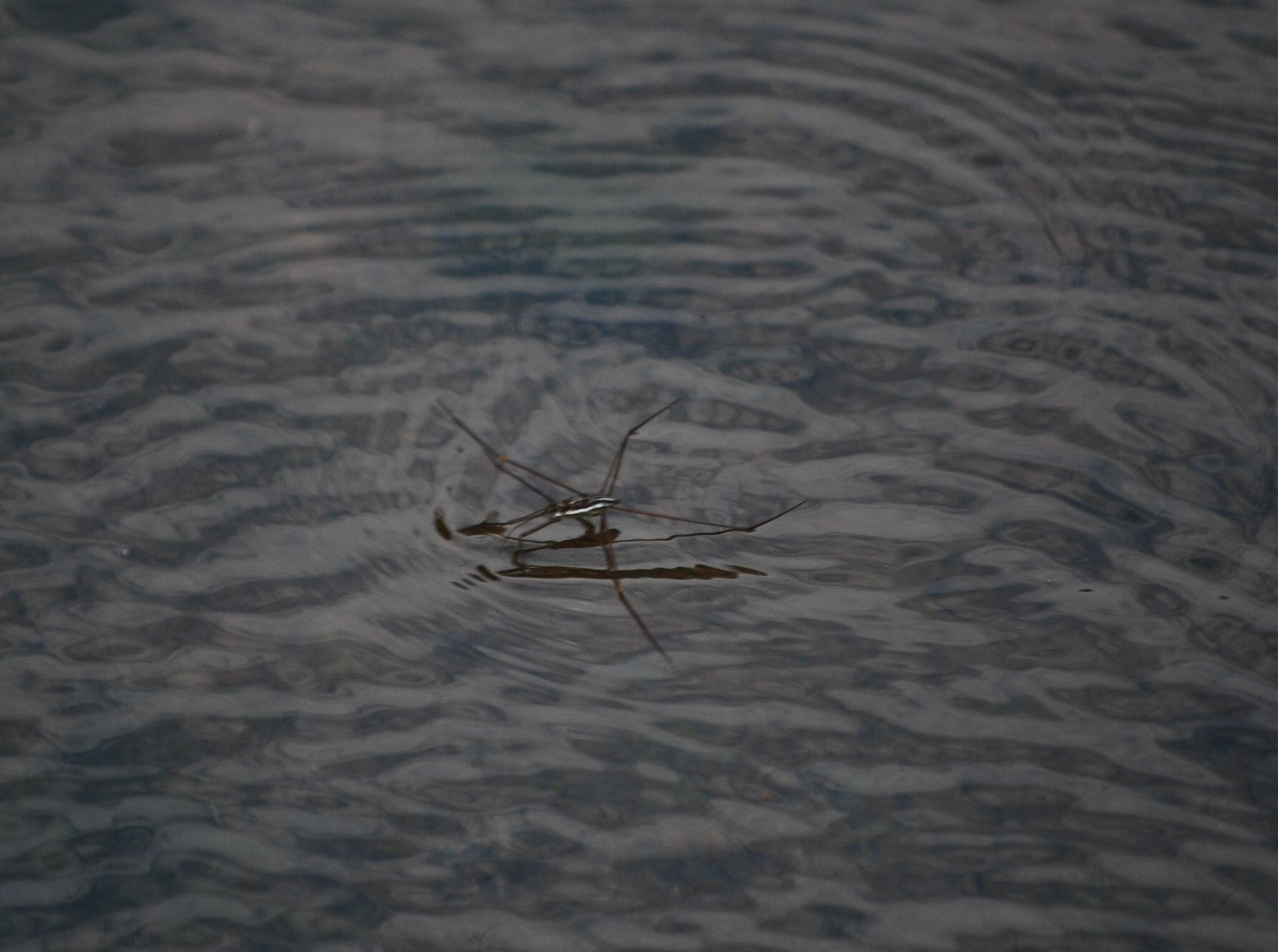
Ptilomera sp. on the water surface in Thung Yao, Pai District, Mae Hong Son 58130, Thailand

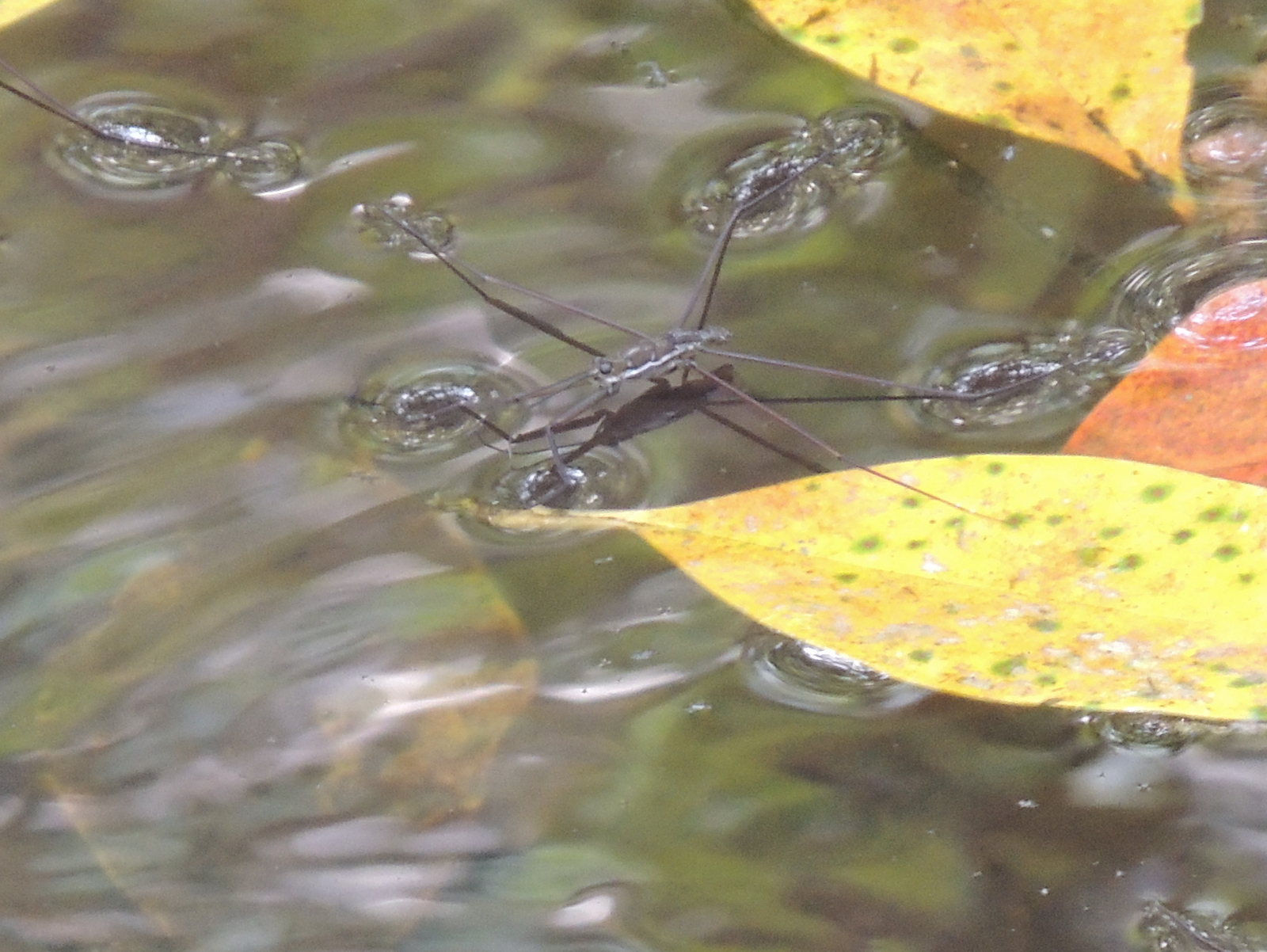
Ptilomera sp. on the water surface in Pune, Maharashtra, India

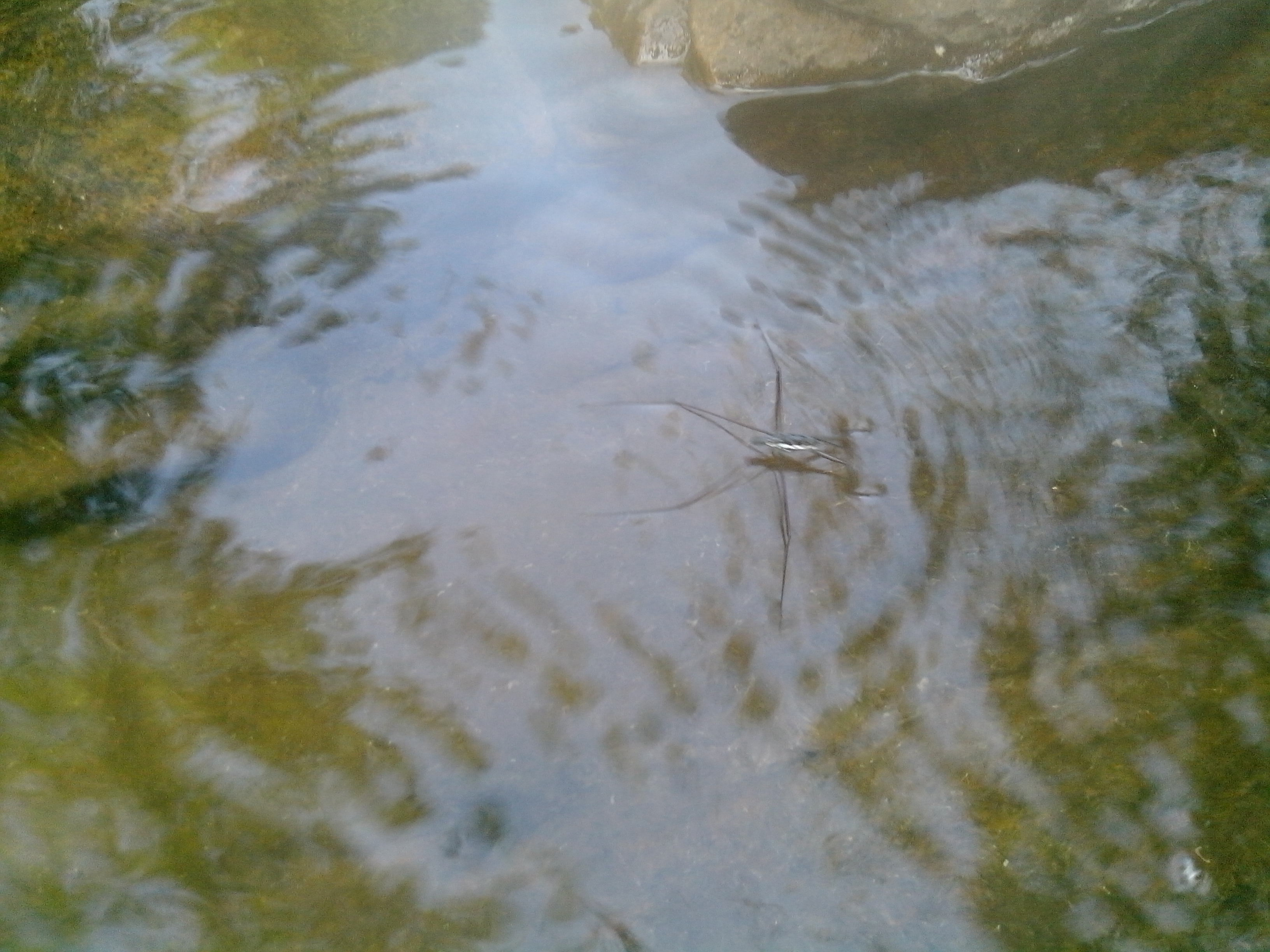
Ptilomera sp. on the Periyar River, India

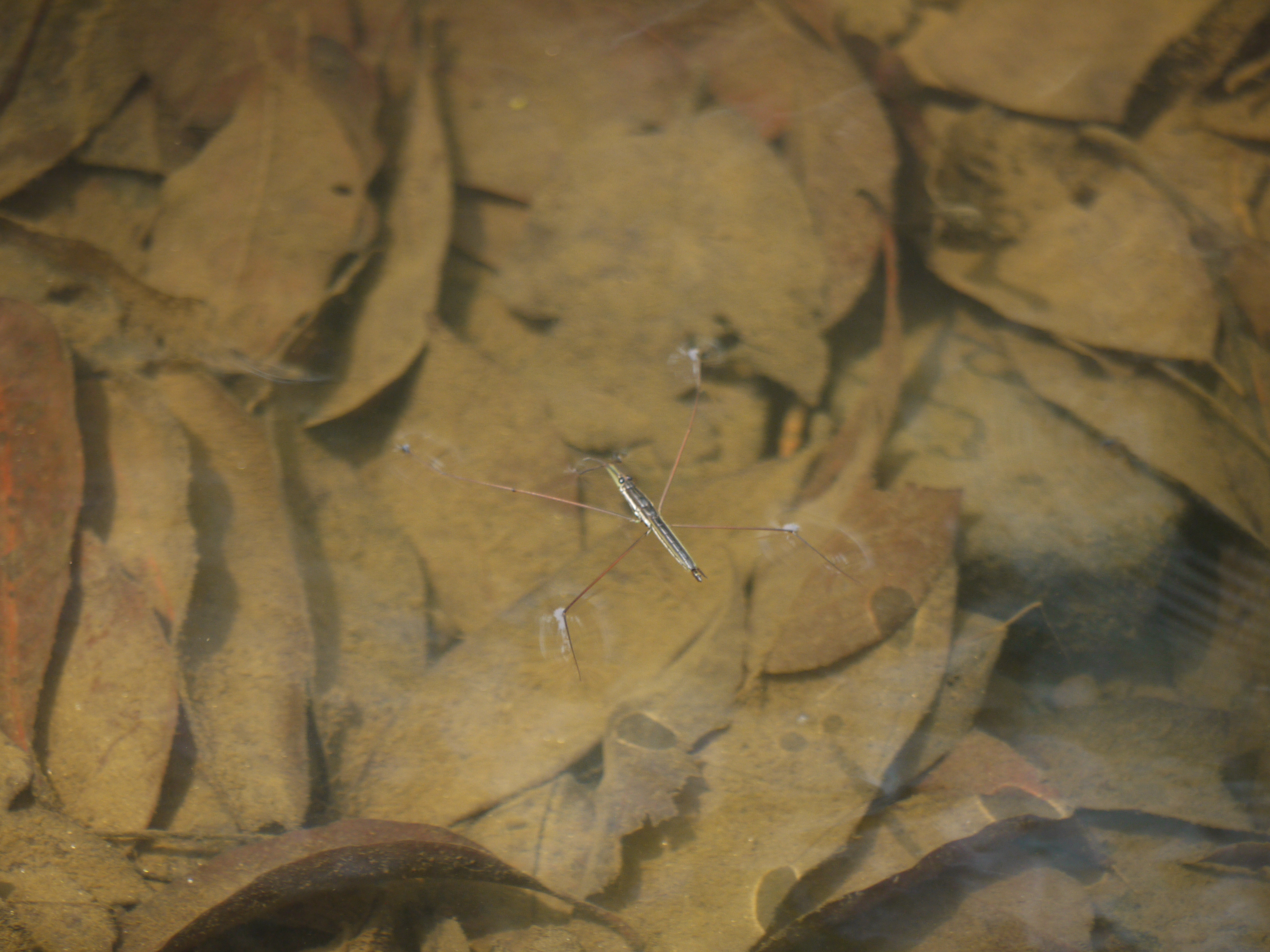
Ptilomera sp. on the water surface in India
