= Tachygerris =

Scientific classification
- Kingdom: Animalia
- Phylum: Arthropoda
- Class: Insecta
- Order: Hemiptera
- Suborder: Heteroptera
- Family: Gerridae
- Subfamily: Gerrinae
- Tribe: Tachygerrini
- Genus: Tachygerris; Drake, 1957

Genus of true bugs

Tachygerris is a genus of water striders.

== Species ==
- Tachygerris adamsoni (Drake, 1942)
- Tachygerris celocis (Drake & Harris, 1931)
- Tachygerris dentiferus Padilla-Gil & Nieser, 2010
- Tachygerris opacus (Champion, 1901)
- Tachygerris tucanensis Morales-C. & Castro-Vargas, 2013
- Tachygerris tumaquensis Padilla-Gil, 2010
