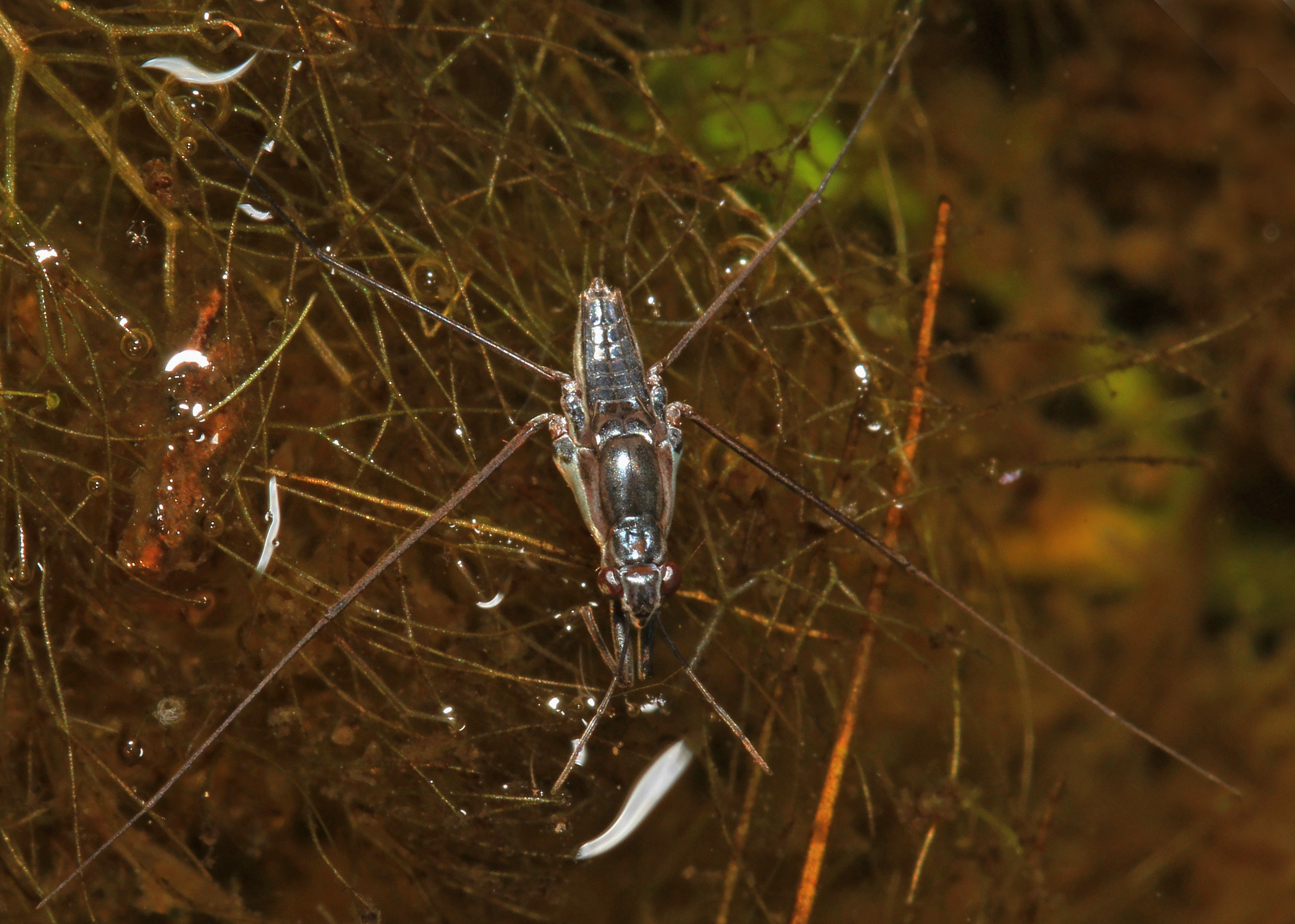
- Neogerris hesione

Scientific classification
- Kingdom: Animalia
- Phylum: Arthropoda
- Clade: Pancrustacea
- Class: Insecta
- Order: Hemiptera
- Suborder: Heteroptera
- Family: Gerridae
- Subfamily: Gerrinae
- Genus: Neogerris; Matsumura, 1913

= Neogerris =

Genus of true bugs

Neogerris is a genus of water striders in the family Gerridae. There are about 13 described species in Neogerris.

== Species ==
These 13 species belong to the genus Neogerris:

- Neogerris assimilis Andersen, 1975
- Neogerris boninensis Matsumura, 1913
- Neogerris celeris (Drake & Harris, 1934)
- Neogerris genticus (Drake & Harris, 1934)
- Neogerris hesione (Kirkaldy, 1902)
- Neogerris kontos Nieser, 1994
- Neogerris lotus (White, 1879)
- Neogerris lubricus (White, 1879)
- Neogerris magnus (Kuitert, 1942)
- Neogerris parvulus (Stål, 1859)
- Neogerris philippinensis Zettel, 2004-01
- Neogerris severini (Kirkaldy, 1900)
- Neogerris visendus (Drake & Harris, 1934)
