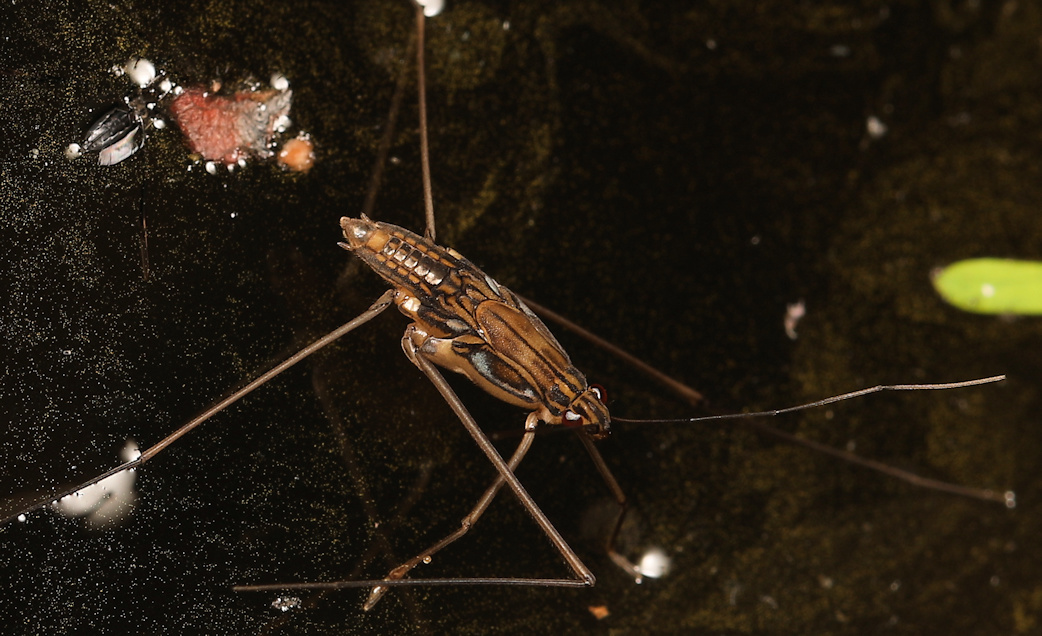

Scientific classification
- Kingdom: Animalia
- Phylum: Arthropoda
- Clade: Pancrustacea
- Class: Insecta
- Order: Hemiptera
- Suborder: Heteroptera
- Family: Gerridae
- Tribe: Gerrini
- Genus: Tenagogonus; Stål, 1853

= Tenagogonus =

Genus of true bugs

Tenagogonus is a genus of water striders.

== Species ==
- Tenagogonus ceylonensis Hungerford & Matsuda, 1962
- Tenagogonus nicobarensis Andersen, 1964
- Tenagogonus venkataramani Jehamalar & Chandra, 2013
