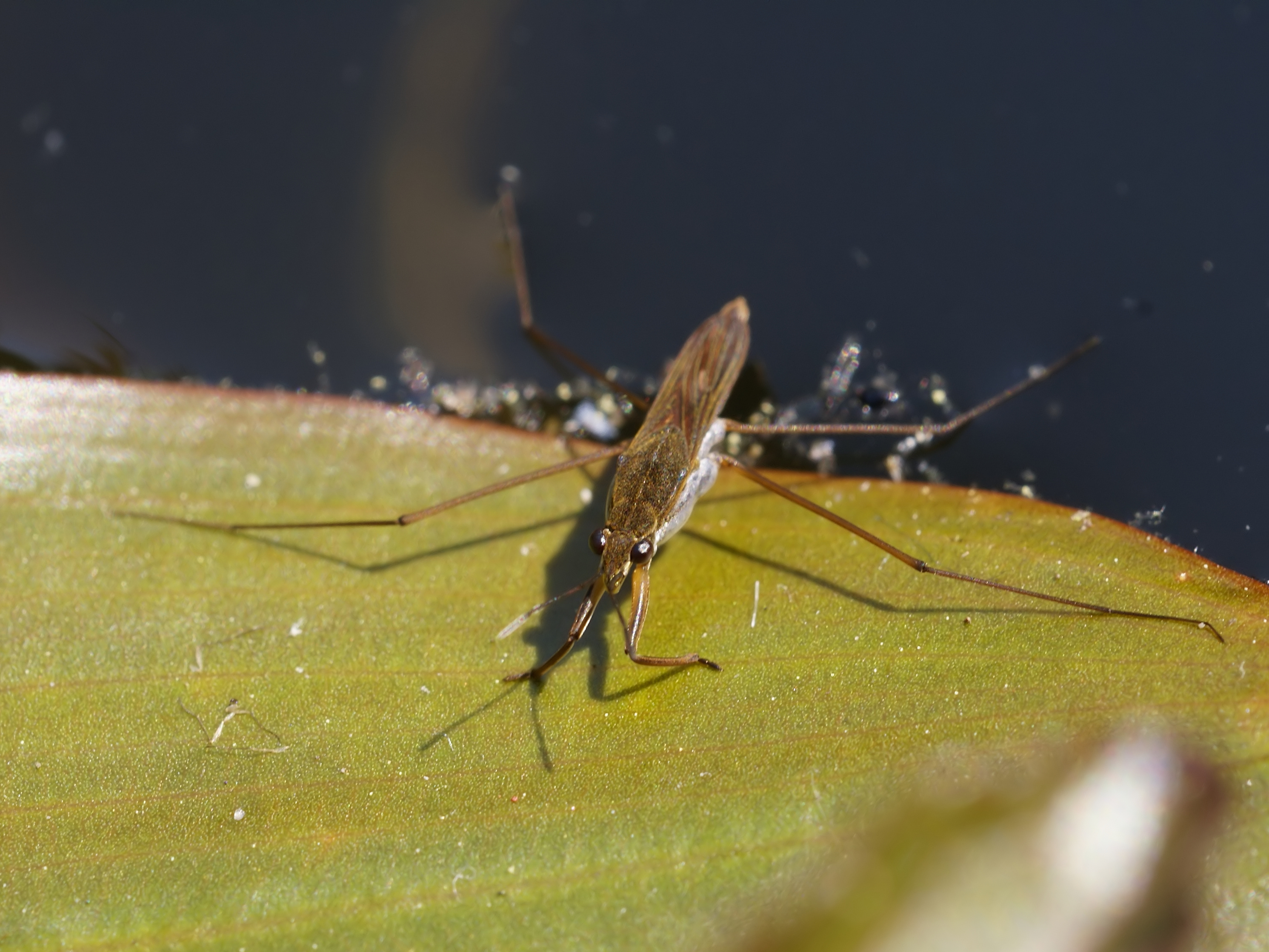
- Gerris lacustris

Scientific classification
- Kingdom: Animalia
- Phylum: Arthropoda
- Clade: Pancrustacea
- Class: Insecta
- Order: Hemiptera
- Suborder: Heteroptera
- Family: Gerridae
- Subfamily: Gerrinae; Leach, 1815

= Gerrinae =

Subfamily of true bugs

Gerrinae is a subfamily of water striders consists of thirteen extant genera in two tribes and three fossil genera. The subfamily includes some of the best-known species of Gerridae and the largest species, Gigantometra gigas.

== Description ==
Like all water striders, Gerrinae have two antennae, a narrow thorax, and six legs, which bear hydrophobic microhairs that allow them to walk on water.

Members of the Gerrinae subfamily are characterized by having long slender bodies. Typically, juvenile Gerrini range from lengths of 1 to 13 mm and widths of 0.5 to 3 mm. Adult lengths are 4 to 17 mm and widths 1 to 4 mm. Notably, these striders share similar sizes with the Cylindrostethinae and Ptilomerinae, subfamilies within the Gerridae family.

== Habitat ==
Gerrinae are aquatic insects and are found in inland waters, inhabiting ponds and streams. They can be commonly found throughout most of the world's freshwaters. While they often aggregate, these insects prefer not to live in close, compact groups.

Their most common source of prey are smaller insects. They will usually only go after anything that is helplessly stuck in the water. Cases of cannibalism during food shortages have been recorded, with young nymphs and weaker adults often falling victim.

== Taxa ==
The following tribes and genera are considered part of Gerrinae:

- Gerrini
  - Aquarius Schellenberg, 1800
  - Gerris Fabricius, 1794
  - Gigantometra (China, 1925)
  - Limnogonus Stål, 1868
  - Limnometra Mayr, 1865
  - Limnoporus Stål, 1868
  - Neogerris Matsumura, 1913
  - Tenagogerris Hungerford and Matsuda, 1958
  - Tenagogonus Stål, 1853
  - Tenagometra Poisson, 1949
  - Tenagometrella Poisson, 1958
- Tachygerrini Andersen, 1975
  - Eurygerris Hungerford and Matsuda, 1958
  - Tachygerris Drake, 1957
- Extinct (fossil) genera
  - †Electrogerris Andersen, 2000
  - †Palaeogerris Andersen, 1998
  - †Succineogerris Andersen, 2000
  - †Telmatrechus (Ypresian; Western North America)
