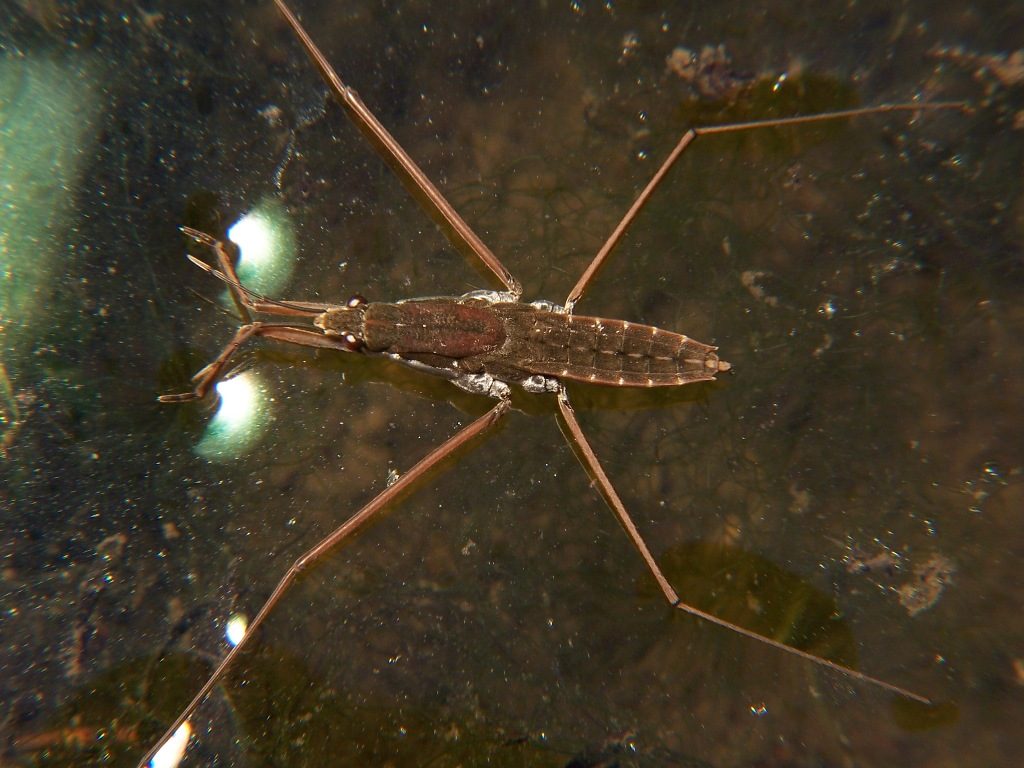
- Adult

Conservation status
- Least Concern (IUCN 3.1)

Scientific classification
- Kingdom: Animalia
- Phylum: Arthropoda
- Clade: Pancrustacea
- Class: Insecta
- Order: Hemiptera
- Suborder: Heteroptera
- Family: Gerridae
- Genus: Aquarius
- Species: A. remigis

Binomial name
- Aquarius remigis (Say, 1832)

Synonyms
- Gerris remigis Say, 1832

= Aquarius remigis =

Species of true bug

Aquarius remigis, known as the common water strider or North American common water strider, is a species of aquatic bug. It was formerly known as Gerris remigis, but the subgenus Aquarius was elevated to generic rank in 1990 on the basis of phylogenetic analysis. Aquarius remigis is found throughout North America, but is most prevalent in the mid-west of the United States.

== Description ==
Aquarius remigis grows slightly longer than .5 inches, and is dark brown to black. It has a sharp rostrum that it uses to pierce the body of its prey and suck out the insides.

== Behaviour ==
They normally continue to move to avoid being eaten by predators. It has good vision, and can row quickly over the surface of the water. It uses its front legs to seize its prey.

During breeding season, this species can communicate with potential mates by sending ripples over on the surface of the water.

Adult females normally lay their eggs on plant stems at the water's edge.

== Diet ==
This predatory species feeds on mosquito larvae living under the surface, and dead insects on the surface, and other insects that accidentally land on the water.
