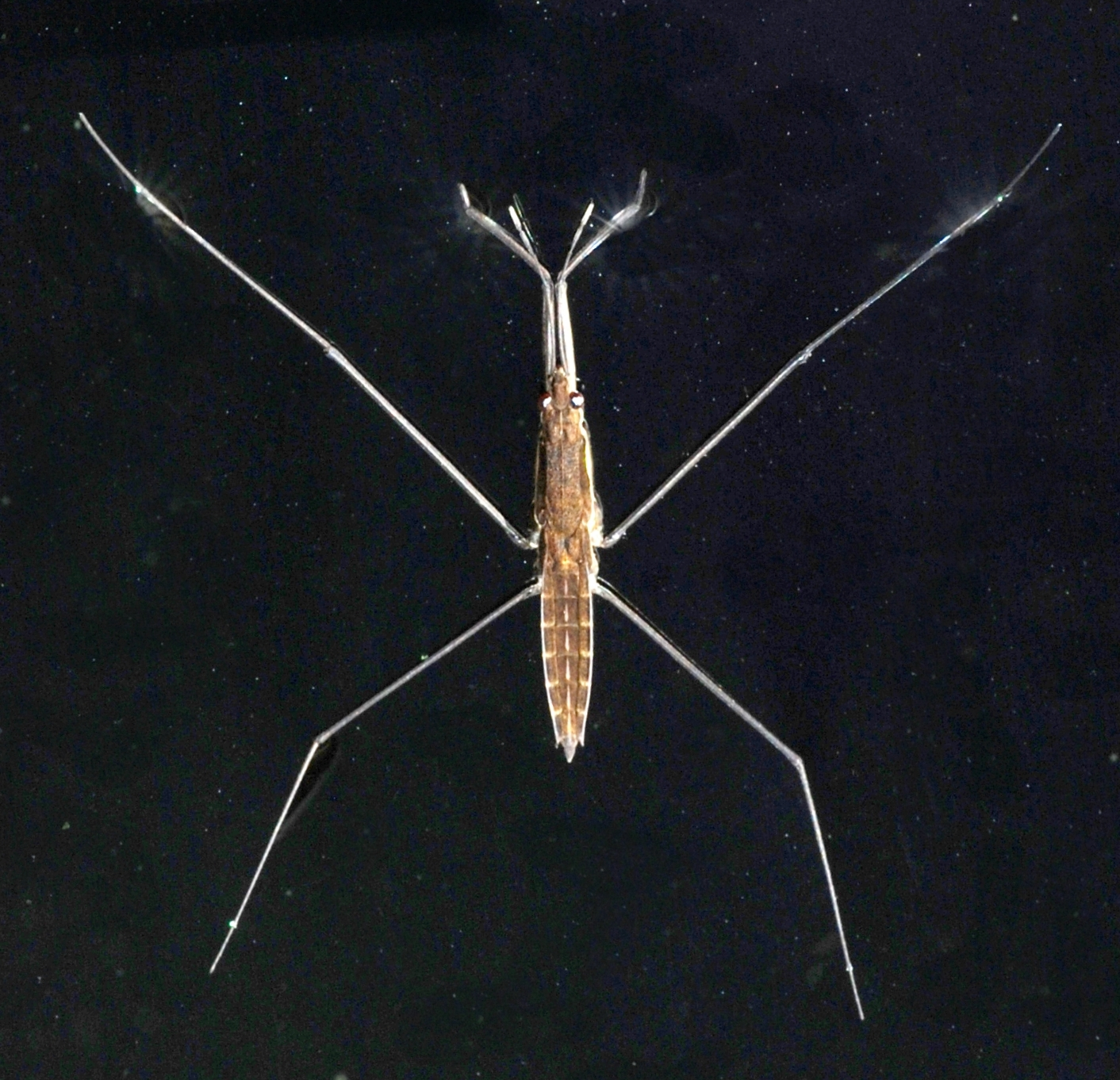
- Aquarius najas

Scientific classification
- Kingdom: Animalia
- Phylum: Arthropoda
- Class: Insecta
- Order: Hemiptera
- Suborder: Heteroptera
- Family: Gerridae
- Tribe: Gerrini
- Genus: Aquarius; Schellenberg, 1800

= Aquarius (bug) =

Genus of true bugs

Aquarius is a genus of water striders found predominantly in the northern hemisphere. Formerly a subgenus, Aquarius was elevated to generic rank in 1990 on the basis of phylogenetic analysis. These are among the world's largest water striders, with females averaging 12–17 mm (0.47–0.67 in) long and males roughly 10–30% smaller, depending on the exact species. An outlier is A. elongatus where both sexes typically are about 24 mm (0.94 in), roughly the same as certain Cylindrostethus, and second only to Gigantometra gigas.

== Species ==
There are 19 species in the genus Aquarius:

- Aquarius adelaidis (Dohrn, 1860)
- Aquarius amplus (Drake & Harris, 1938)
- Aquarius antigone (Kirkaldy, 1899)
- Aquarius chilensis (Berg, 1881)
- Aquarius cinereus (Puton, 1869)
- Aquarius conformis (Uhler, 1878)
- Aquarius distanti (Horváth, 1899)
- Aquarius elongatus (Uhler, 1896)
- Aquarius fabricii Andersen, 1990
- Aquarius lili D.Polhemus & J.Polhemus, 1994
- Aquarius lunpolaensis (Linnaeus, 1981)
- Aquarius najas (De Geer, 1773) (river skater)
- Aquarius nebularis (Drake & Hottes, 1925)
- Aquarius nyctalis (Drake & Hottes, 1925)
- Aquarius paludum (Fabricius, 1794) (pond water strider)
- Aquarius philippinensis Zettel & Ruiz, 2003
- Aquarius remigis (Say, 1832) (common water strider)
- Aquarius remigoides Gallant & Fairbairn, 1996
- Aquarius ventralis (Fieber, 1861)
