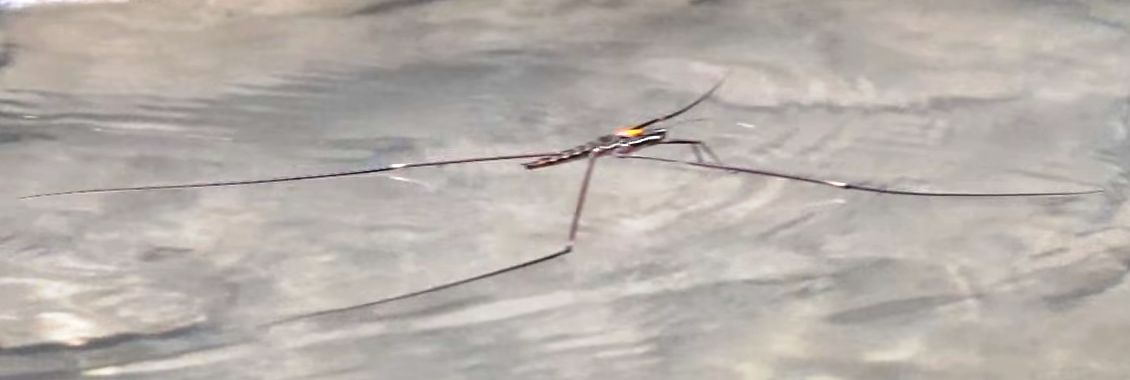

Scientific classification
- Kingdom: Animalia
- Phylum: Arthropoda
- Clade: Pancrustacea
- Class: Insecta
- Order: Hemiptera
- Suborder: Heteroptera
- Family: Gerridae
- Subfamily: Gerrinae
- Tribe: Gerrini
- Genus: Gigantometra; Hungerford & Matsuda, 1958
- Species: G. gigas

Binomial name
- Gigantometra gigas (China, 1925)

= Gigantometra =

Species of water bug

Gigantometra is a monotypic genus of water-strider bugs, containing the species Gigantometra gigas. It is the largest hemipteran by legspan. It inhabits pools of fast-flowing, subtropical and tropical forest streams, on Hainan Island and highland northern Vietnam.

== Description ==
Gigantometra gigas is the largest species of water-striders, with legs having a span of about 300 mm (12 in) in order to spread its relatively large body weight on the water surface. Sexual dimorphism is common throughout the Gerridae; due to sexual selection, males are larger than females in all measured traits, and this is observed in several water strider species, including this one. This dimorphism is especially prominent in the leg segments, which are 10–50% longer in males than in females; males are generally more variable in size than females, especially with leg segments. It was proposed that sexual selection acts on the length of middle legs in males and explains both the increase and variance in middle leg length, with hind leg length similarly correlated.
