= Tangascootack Creek =

Stream in Susquehanna River, Pennsylvania

Coordinates: 41.1780°N 77.5476°W

- Location within the United States Location within Pennsylvania
- Etymology: Native American word for "a foe", also a Nanticoke chief's name

Location
- Country: United States
- State: Pennsylvania
- County: Clinton

Physical characteristics
- Source
  - location: Beech Creek Township
- Mouth
  - location: West Branch Susquehanna River, Colebrook Township
- Length: 11.4 mi (18.3 km)
- Basin size: 36.5 sq mi (95 km^{2})

Basin features
- Progression: West Branch Susquehanna River, Susquehanna River, Chesapeake Bay
- Tributaries
  - left: North Fork Tangascootack Creek, Muddy Run

Tangascootack Creek (also known as Scootack or Tangascootac Creek) is a tributary of the West Branch Susquehanna River in Clinton County, Pennsylvania in the United States. Tangascootack Creek stretches for 11.4 miles (18.3 km) through Bald Eagle, Beech Creek and Colebrook Townships. Its watershed covers 36.5 square miles. Among its tributaries are North Fork Tangascootack Creek and Muddy Run, and there is also a swamp called Bear Swamp near the headwaters. Coal mining, including strip mining, was common in the watershed throughout the 1800s and 1900s. The creek experiences acid mine drainage, much of which comes from Muddy Run.

The watershed is mostly forest and sparsely populated. Historically, the area supports industry in agriculture, lumbering, and coal and iron mining. Native American crucibles have been discovered along the Creek.

Minerals in the watershed are mostly bituminous coal, fireclay, sandstone and slate. The daily loads of aluminum and manganese are both many times higher than the creek's total maximum daily load. The conductance of the creek ranges from 93.7 to 549 micro-siemens per centimeter. The creek is one of the most downstream tributaries of the West Branch Susquehanna River contributing acid mine drainage to it.

Pocono sandstone can also be found in the watershed, and bituminous coal formations known as the Clarion Formation, the Lower Kittanning Formation and the Eagleton Coal field also exist in the creek's watershed. The valley of Tangascootack Creek is the only place in Bald Eagle Township where there are significant deposits of minerals.

The middle and upper reaches of Tangascootack Creek are nearly devoid of life due to acid mine drainage. However, the headwaters have some aquatic life, as they are further upstream. Brook trout and three other species of fish inhabit the creek. 13 species of benthic macroinvertebrate also inhabit it.

== Course ==
Tangascootack Creek is 11.4 miles (18.3 km) long. The creek flows northeast from the marshland of Beech Creek Township, in Sproul State Forest, near the border between Clinton County and Centre County. It passes strip mines and Bear Swamp before entering Bald Eagle Township. It then flows past more strip mines before entering into a gradually deepening gorge. Over the next few miles, it makes several meanders before being joined by its tributary North Fork Tangascootack Creek and eventually the tributary Bird Run. The creek briefly enters Colebrook Township before flowing into the West Branch Susquehanna River, 2 miles (3.2 km) west of Farrandsville.

=== Tributaries ===
Tangascootack Creek has a major tributary, North Fork Tangascootack Creek, a minor tributary called Muddy Run and at least two that are unnamed.

== Hydrology ==
A 2011 study found an aluminium concentration of 1.12 milligrams per liter near the confluence with Muddy Run. This equates to 23.8 pounds (10.8 kilograms) per day, far greater that the 6.4 pounds (2.9 kg) total maximum daily load that is allowed under United States water quality standards. The iron concentration is 0.87 milligrams per liter, or 18.5 pounds (8.4 kg) per day. The concentration of manganese is 15.19 milligrams per liter, or 322.9 pounds (146.5 kg) per day, 101 times higher than the maximum load of 3.22 pounds (1.46 kg) per day allowed by the Environmental Protection Agency.

Just above the creek's confluence with North Fork Tangascootack Creek, the aluminum concentration is 0.4 milligrams per liter and the daily load is 16.2 pounds (7.3 kg). The concentration of iron is 0.08 milligrams per liter, or 3.2 pounds (1.5 kg) per day. The concentration of manganese is 3.32 milligrams per liter and the load is 133.3 pounds (60.5 kg) per day. This is only about seven times higher than the maximum allowable load, much less than the manganese load near Muddy Run.

Near Muddy Run, the concentration of acidity is 27.44 milligrams per liter, which equates to a load of 583.4 pounds (264.6 kg) per day and upstream of North Fork Tangascootack Creek, the concentration is 7.80 milligrams per liter and the daily load is 313.3 pounds (142.1 kg). The pH of the creek was measured in four locations in early July 2010. It ranged from 6.24 downstream of Muddy Run to 6.79 at further downstream of Muddy Run, with an average pH of 6.58.

The conductance of Tangascootack Creek at several sites in 2010 ranged from 93.7 micro-siemens per centimeter at the site T-0.5 to 549 micro-siemens per centimeter at the site T-2 and the average was 357.4 micro-siemens per centimeter. The water temperature of the creek was measured at two sites downstream of Muddy Run in July 2010. It was 11.4 °C (52.5 °F) and 11.7 °C (53.1 °F) at the sites.

Traveling downstream, Tangascootack Creek is one of the last streams to contribute acid mine drainage to the West Branch Susquehanna River.

== Watershed ==
Tangascootack Creek's watershed covers 36.4 square miles (94 km^{2}) in the southern part of Clinton County, half of which is the watershed for North Fork Tangascootack Creek. A small amount of the watershed, less than 1%, has occasional residential uses, including sport camps and summer retreats. In formerly strip-mined areas there are patches of grassland and reforestation. Almost all of the area that is considered impaired by the Environmental Protection Agency, is forested. However, in areas where strip mining was done in the past, there are patches of grassland or reforested land. This land includes sports camps and summer retreats.

== Geography and geology ==
The Tangascootack Creek valley is the only part of Bald Eagle Township that has significant amounts of minerals. Sandstones and conglomerates are visible on escarpments on the sides of the creek. Pocono sandstone is found on both the main stem and North Fork Tangascootack Creek, but no Mauch Chunk red shale is found near either branch. Coal formations in the creek's watershed include the Clarion formation, the Lower Kittaning formation, and the Eagleton coal field. Brown sandstone from the surface to 35 feet (11 m) down, blue slate from about 55 feet (17 m) to 66 feet (20 m) down, and fireclay from 66 feet (20 m) to 76 feet (23 m) down are also found in the rocks on the creek. Two to three feet of coal are below the fireclay and 4 to 5.5 feet are below the brown sandstone. Additionally, a graphite deposit was discovered on the creek by James David. The coal in the creek's watershed is bituminous coal.

A bed of coal known as the middle bed was observed in the 1800s to be found near the mouth of Tangascootack Creek, as well as in other locations. This bed ranged from 4 inches (10 cm) to 48 inches (120 cm) thick and contained iron pyrite as well. It was at least 107 feet (33 m) underground. An 1854 report estimated that there were 27,878,400 pounds (12,645,400 kg) of workable coal near Tangascootack Creek.

The Tangascootack Creek watershed consists chiefly of valleys and rolling and broken hills. The creek's river channel is relatively sinuous. It is mostly sandstone and shale with some coal. The slope of the creek is 65.3 feet (19.9 m) per mile, and its mouth's elevation is 554 feet (169 m) above sea level.

== History ==
A settler named Dan Jones was killed by Indians on Tangascootack Creek in late fall 1777. In 1854, James Wilson discovered several crudely constructed crucibles in a place known as the Rock Cavern on Tangascootack Creek. They were made by Native Americans and had been used for smelting. Around 1840, the canal commissioners of a canal on the West Branch Susquehanna River received instructions to extend the canal as far as the mouth of Tangascootack Creek.

Mining in the creek's watershed began in 1844. A number of mining villages existed in the Tangascootack Creek watershed between 1845 and 1870. In the mid-1850s the Farrandsville Iron Company purchased large amounts of land in several places, including along Tangascootack Creek. In 1870 all of the mines in the area closed and lumbering became the area's most significant industry, with millions of board feet being floated downstream. The railroad tracks were removed and the mine buildings were abandoned or burned down. However, deep mining of the Clarion coal formation and the Lower Kittaning coal formation in the Tangascootack Creek watershed began in the 1800s and continued into the early 1900s. Strip mining operations began in the 1950s and 1960s, with some of the deep mines and surface mines being remined in the 1980s. The Independent Regulatory Review Commission issued a statement in the summer of 1987, saying that part of the North Fork Tangascootack Creek watershed was no longer suitable for surface mining. Treatment of the watershed began as early as 1998. Several projects devoted to improving the water quality of the creek had begun by 2001, by which point several more projects were planned. At least one of these projects involves the use of biosolids to encourage vegetation growth.

A gristmill built at the mouth of the creek was one of the first manufacturing buildings on the West Branch Susquehanna River upstream of Big Island. In 1864 a large sawmill was constructed on Tangascootack Creek a short distance above the mouth and several years later a shingle mill was built in the area. The sawmill was also expanded and six dams were constructed on the creek. The total cost of this project was $100,000. Agriculture was another industry that was practiced in the area of the creek in the early 1900s. In 1859 the Sunbury and Erie Railroad went into the creek's valley.

In the late 1800s, lumbering on North Fork Tangascootack Creek was a viable industry and the historic community of Eagleton was in the Tangascootack Creek valley. In the early 20th century, the Pennsylvania Railroad passed through the Tangascootack Creek basin. During this time, the Scootac Railway ran alongside the upper reaches of the creek.

John Reaville said around 1940 that the Tangascootack Creek valley is the "only one in Pennsylvania with four deserted villages that once flourished so promisingly on the eastern base of the great bituminous coal fields of Pennsylvania and marked its progress westward."

In March 2026 the Pennsylvania Department of Environmental Protection awarded over $15 million to restore abandoned mine land in the area, with Trout Unlimited giving $377,021 to the Tangascootack creek watershed and mine drainage system specifically.

=== Etymology ===
"Tangascootac" is a Native American word for "a foe" and also refers to a Nanticoke chief. The creek has sometimes been called Scootack or Tangascootac Creek.

== Biology ==
Tangascootack Creek is considered to be a cold water fishery. The tributary North Fork Tangascootack Creek has significant trout and macroinvertebrate populations. On the main stem of the creek, there are limited numbers of fish and some aquatic ecosystems, though in the middle and upper parts of the creek, there is virtually no life in the water. Near the headwaters and Bear Swamp, there is some aquatic life, as these locations are upstream of the strip mines and acid mine drainage. The main species of fish in the creek are brook trout, Semotilus atromaculatus, Catostomus commersoni, and Rhinichthys atratulus. Young-of-the-Year trout also live in the creek.

The quantity of benthic macroinvertebrates at sites in Tangascootack Creek has been measured by the West Branch Susquehanna Restoration Coalition using different systems. These sites included designations T-1 and T-2—the main creek just above and below the entry of Muddy Run, respectively—and T-3 which is further downstream from T-2. Total taxa richness, as measured by the organization, ranged from 3 at sites T-2 and T-3 to 7 at site T-1, with an average of 4.3. The EPT Taxa Richness (measured on a scale of 0 to 4) ranged from 0 at sites T-2 and T-3 to 2 at site T-1, with an average of 0.7. The scores of the sites according to version 3 of the Beck's Index (twice the number of pollution-intolerant benthos taxa plus the number of facultative benthos taxa) ranged from 0 at sites T-2 and T-3 to 6 at site T-1. On the Hilsenhoff Biotic Index (a method of determining a stream's ecosystem quality based on its benthic macroinvertebrates), the sites ranged from 3.538 for site T-1 to 6.2 for site T-2, with an average of 5.024. On the Shannon index, the sites ranged from 0.950 at site T-2 to 1.925 at site T-3, with an average of 1.325.

The West Branch Susquehanna Restoration Coalition measured several sites on Tangascootack Creek based on their habitat quality. The assessment measured 12 different values, including instream cover and the width of the riparian zone on a scale of 0 to 240. The site T-1 had a score of 203 and the site T-3 had a score of 198. Both were considered optimal habitats. However, T-2 had a score of 179, making it a suboptimal habitat.

A total of 13 benthic macroinvertebrates were observed by the West Branch Susquehanna Restoration Coalition at site T-1. Five were observed at site T-2 and three were observed at site T-3. The benthic macroinvertebrates included two specimens each of Leuctra, Palpomyia, Dicranota, Diplectrona, and Hydropsyche Chironomidae. One specimen of Sialis was observed. The benthic macroinvertebrates included three specimens of Chironomidae, and one each of Tipula and Trepobates. The benthic macroinvertebrates included one specimen each of Chironomidae, Hydropsyche, and Ceratopsyche.

== See also ==
- List of rivers of Pennsylvania
- Bald Eagle Creek (West Branch Susquehanna River)
- Hyner Run
