= Snowball & Son =

Former department store in Gateshead

Snowball & Son was a department store located in Gateshead.

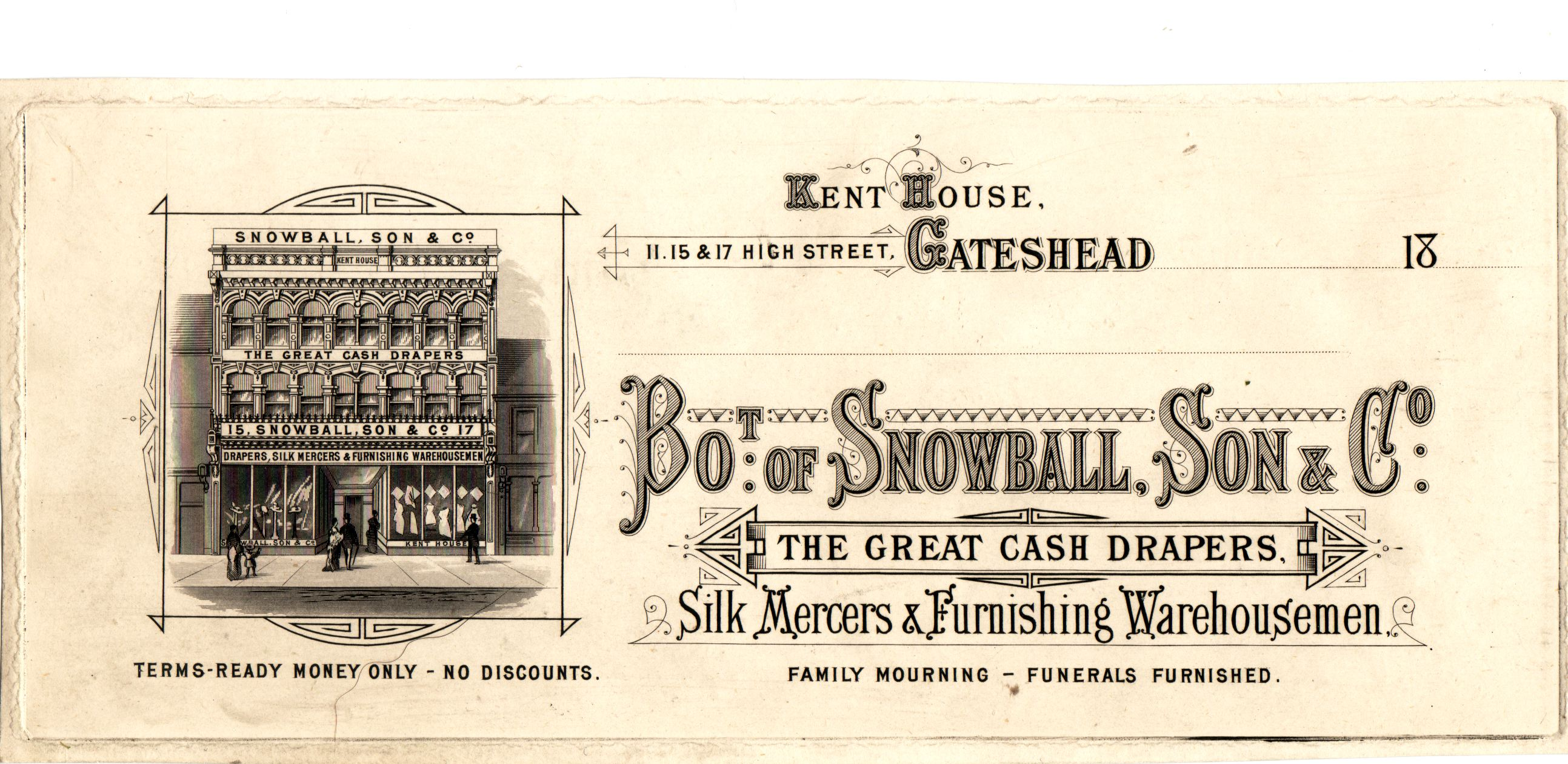

== History ==
In 1850, William Snowball opened his department store at 15-25 High Street, Gateshead. The store sold a variety of household goods and furnishings. William's older brother James Snowball was a successful businessman running the Snowball Fire Brick company and owning several Collierys.

In 1882 William retired from the business to be replaced by his son, George Laverick Snowball and his son-inlaw William Fenwick McAllum.

By 1889 the business employed over 200 people and was known as the Harrods of the North by locals. However, during the Second World War the business struggled like many small department stores in the United Kingdom and closed its doors.

The building was used from 1946 to 1949 by Shephards department store while the building was being rebuilt after a devastating fire.
