= North Fork Tangascootack Creek =

Tributary of Tangascootack Creek

- Etymology: Native American word for "a foe", also a Nanticoke chief's name

Physical characteristics
- Source
  - location: Beech Creek Township, Pennsylvania
- Mouth
  - location: Tangascootack Creek in Beech Creek Township, Pennsylvania
  - coordinates: 41°09′43″N 77°34′41″W
  - elevation: 666 ft (203 m)
- Length: 7.1 mi (11.4 km)
- Basin size: 19.2 mi^{2} (50 km^{2})

Basin features
- Progression: Tangascootack Creek → West Branch Susquehanna River → Susquehanna River → Chesapeake Bay
- Tributaries
  - left: Mill Branch, Boiler Run

North Fork Tangascootack Creek is a tributary of Tangascootack Creek in Clinton County, Pennsylvania, in the United States. It is 7.1 miles (11.4 km) long and flows through Beech Creek Township. The creek's watershed has an area of 19.2 square miles (50 km^{2}). Its major tributaries include Mill Branch and Boiler Run. North Fork Tangascootack Creek does not experience much acid mine drainage and its trout and macroinvertebrate populations are sizeable. The creek is near the Slaughtering Ground Barrens.

== Course ==
North Fork Tangascootack Creek begins in a valley in eastern Beech Creek Township. The creek flows east-northeast, receiving the tributaries Left Branch Puncheon Run and Cowlick Run from the left. The creek then enters Bald Eagle Township, where its valley gets deeper. In western Bald Eagle Township, it receives the tributary Mill Branch from the left. As the creek continues in the same direction, it passes by several strip mines. Further on, the creek turns sharply north and then sharply east, eventually receiving the tributary Boiler Run, again from the left. After picking up Buckhorn Hollow, its final tributary, from the left, it turns south. A short distance later, it enters Tangascootack Creek.

North Fork Tangascootack Creek joins Tangascootack Creek 2.48 miles (3.99 km) upstream of its mouth.

=== Tributaries ===
Mill Branch has a watershed area of 5.84 square miles (15.1 km^{2}) and joins the creek 4.66 miles (7.50 km) upstream of its mouth. Boiler Run has a watershed area of 3.63 square miles (9.4 km^{2}) and joins the main stem 2.0 miles (3.2 km) upstream of its mouth. All of the named tributaries of North Fork Tangascootack Creek enter it from the left.

== Hydrology, geology, and geography ==
North Fork Tangascootack Creek is not significantly affected by acid mine drainage.

The watershed of North Fork Tangascootack Creek has an area of 19.2 square miles (50 km^{2}). The creek is shown on the Farrandsville topographical map of the United States Geological Survey.

Outcroppings of sandstone of the Pocono Formation occur in the valley of North Fork Tangascootack Creek. However, the red shale of the Mauch Chunk Formation is not visible in the creek's valley. The hills north of the creek contain no coal but are topped by a conglomerate. The Mercer coal crop line is in the watershed of North Fork Tangascootack Creek. An area of sandy soils is located in the Slaughtering Ground Barrens, immediately north of the creek.

The elevation of North Fork Tangascootack Creek near its mouth is 666 feet (203 m) above sea level. A plateau is located north of the creek.

== History and etymology ==
Historically, the Rock Cabin Railroad ran from the community of Farrandsville up the Tangascootack Creek valley. This railroad had a junction with the Eagleton Railroad at North Fork Tangascootack Creek.

In 1988, a 527-acre tract of land around North Fork Tangascootack Creek was designated as a protected area.

There are a large number of gas well drilling sites just north of North Fork Tangascootack Creek.

Tangascootac is a Native American word for "a foe" and also refers to a Nanticoke chief.

== Biology ==
The trout and macroinvertebrate populations of North Fork Tangascootack Creek have been described as "thriving". Trout reproduce in the creek from its headwaters to its mouth.

The Slaughtering Ground Barrens is situated on a plateau immediately north of North Fork Tangascootack Creek. Plantlife in this area consists of scrub oak, pitch pine, and a number of ericaceous shrubs. The area frequently catches fire, and "fire likely played an important role in shaping" the Slaughtering Ground Barrens Biodiversity Area.

== See also ==
- List of rivers of Pennsylvania
