= RHI Magnesita =

Austrian company

- Company type: Naamloze vennootschap
- Traded as: LSE: RHIM; FTSE 250 component
- Industry: Refractories
- Founded: 1908
- Headquarters: Vienna, Austria
- Key people: Herbert Cordt (Chairman) de:Stefan Borgas (CEO)
- Revenue: ▼€3,366 million (2025)
- Operating income: ▼€223 million (2025)
- Net income: ▼€94 million (2025)
- Number of employees: 20,000 (2026)
- Website: www.rhimagnesita.com/

RHI Magnesita N.V. is a supplier of refractory products, systems and services. It is listed on the London Stock Exchange and is a constituent of the FTSE 250 Index.

== History ==
=== Origins ===
In 1908, Mining engineer Josef Hörhager discovered a magnesite deposit at Millstätter Alpe in Austria. The German-American Emil Winter acquired the mining rights and founded the "Austro-American Magnesite Company" (later Radex Austria).

=== Growth ===
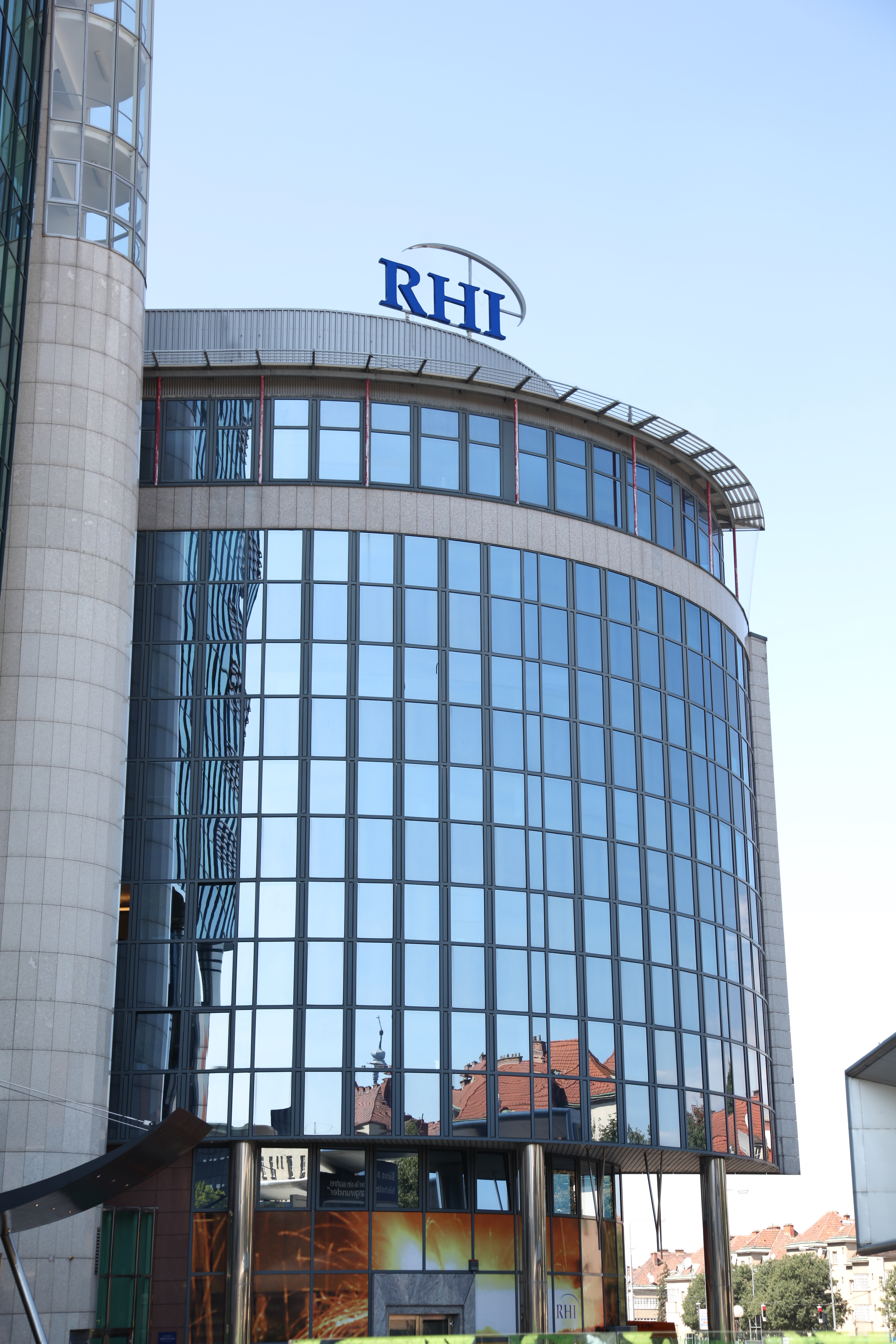
Headquarters on Wienerbergstraße, Vienna

In 1974 the company was bought by National Refractories Co. and in 1987 Radex-Heraklith Industriebeteiligungs AG (RHI AG) emerged from the National Refractories Co. as a result of a management buyout. In 1991, RHI AG acquired Veitscher Magnesitwerke Actien-Gesellschaft, a rival business founded by Carl Spaeter in Germany in 1889.

In 1995, RHI AG acquired a majority stake in its previous competitor Didier-Werke AG. (Note: founded by Friedrich Ferdinand Didier in 1834 when he acquired a brick and lime firing plant near Szczecin in Poland, and established the factory "Chamottefabrik F. Didier" in Podjuchy, thus becoming one of the first manufacturers of refractory bricks in Germany)

RHI AG acquired Global Industrial Technologies (GIT) in 2000. GIT had a subsidiary, APG (formerly A.P. Green Refractories Company), which has been named as defendant in hundreds of thousands of asbestos-related injury litigation cases. GIT entered bankruptcy under Chapter 11, Title 11, United States Code in February 2002. RHI AG sold its North American subsidiaries, including GIT, later in the year. Harbison-Walker Refractories, A.P. Green and North American Refractories were merged and spun off as ANH Refractories Company in 2002 (renamed HarbisonWalker International in 2015). In 2004, the company was required to pay a civil penalty of $650,000 for failing to undertake asbestos remediation at a plant in Marelan, Quebec, Canada which it had been ordered to sell to Resco Products, Inc. in 1999.

=== RHI Magnesita ===
In October 2017 RHI AG merged with Magnesita, a Brazilian competitor, delisted from the Vienna Stock Exchange and secured a listing on the London Stock Exchange as RHI Magnesita. The RHI Magnesita shares can still be traded via the global market segment of the Vienna Stock Exchange. In 2024, it acquired the US-based Resco Group to expand the capacity of its supply chain in the USA.

=== India ===
The company completed the takeover of Stopinc AG (Switzerland) in 2012 and bought a majority stake in Orient Refractories. In May 2021, RHI Magnesita merged its other two Indian subsidiaries, RHI Clasil and RHI India, into Orient Refractories, which was publicly listed. In July 2021, Orient Refractories was renamed to RHI Magnesita India. RHI Magnesita India is publicly listed on the National Stock Exchange of India and the Bombay Stock Exchange.

== Operations ==
The company produces roughly 3 million tons of refractory products each year at 35 main production and 10 main raw material sites around the world.

== Gallery ==
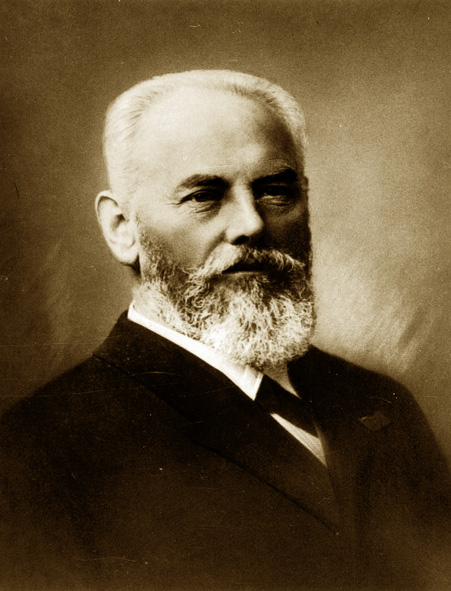
Carl Spaeter.

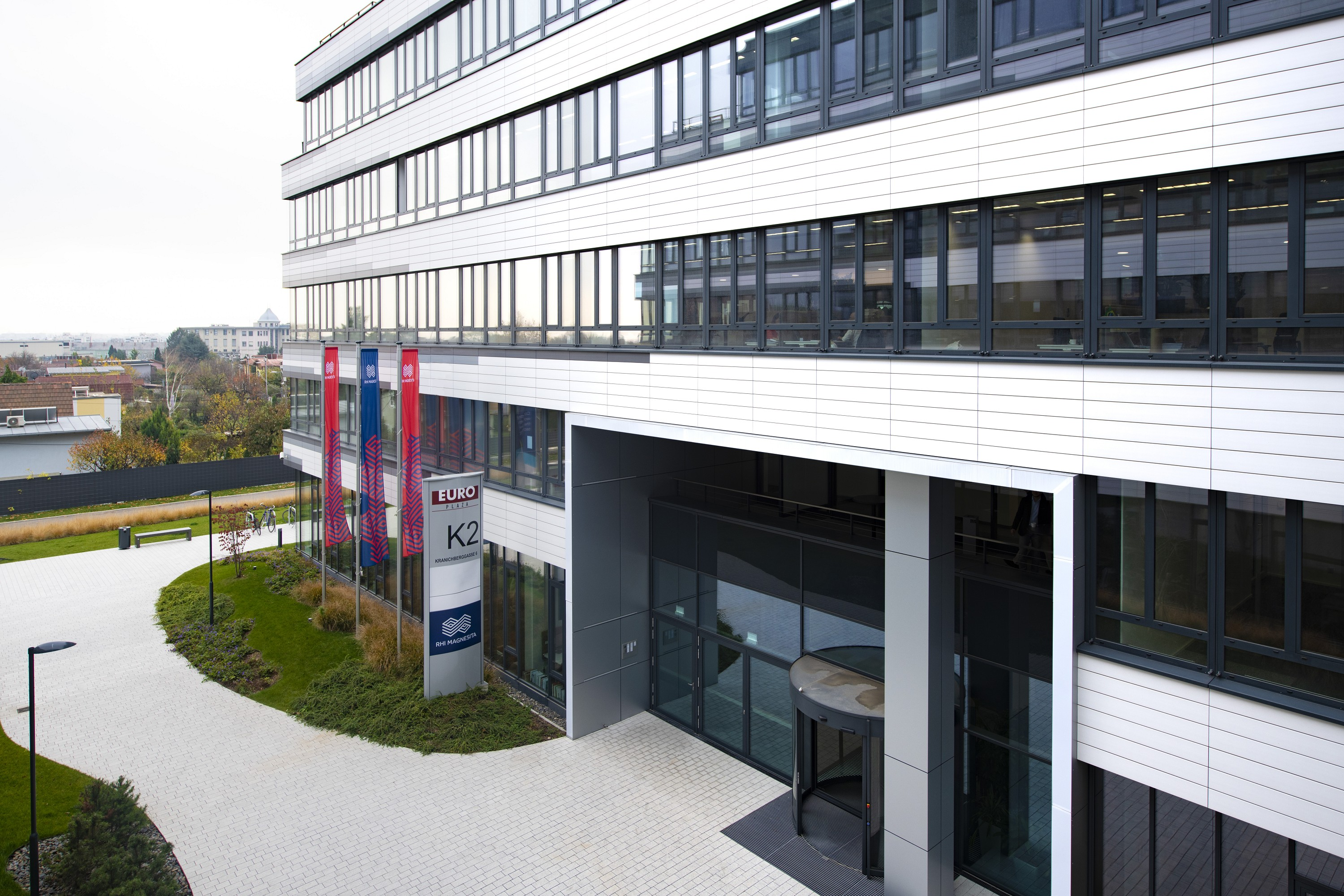
RHI Magnesita Headquarters, Vienna.

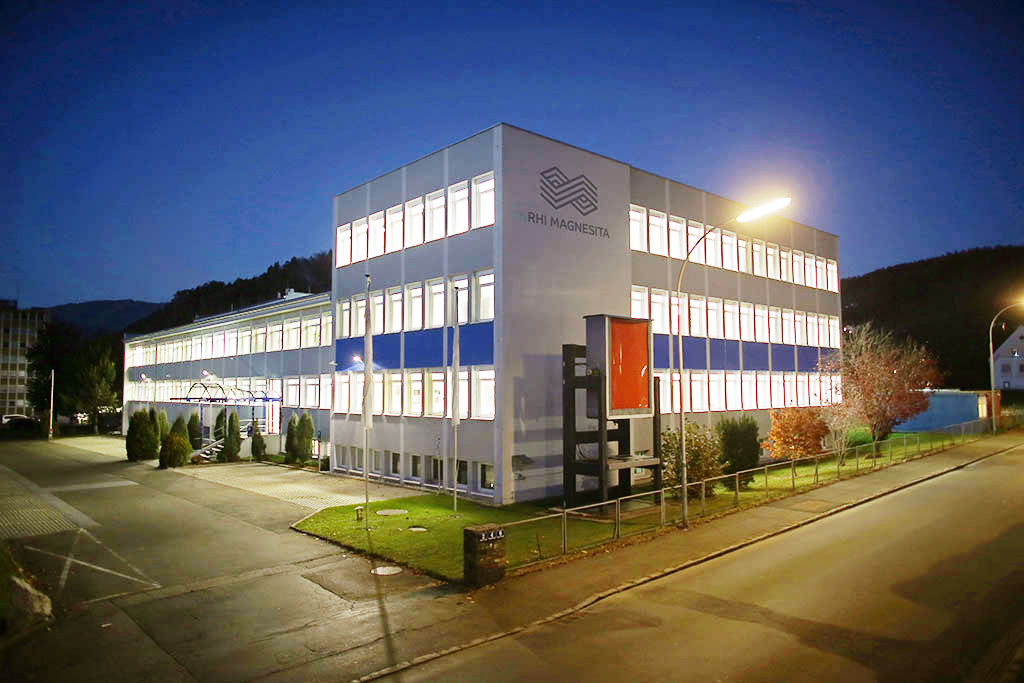
RHI Magnesita Technology Center, Leoben.
