= Calderys =

Manufacturing company

- Type: Private
- Industry: Refractory
- Founded: 2005
- Headquarters: Paris, France
- Area served: Worldwide
- Key people: Michel Cornelissen (President and CEO)
- Number of employees: 4,500 (excluding contractors)
- Website: calderys.com

Calderys is a privately owned company of refractory solutions headquartered in Paris, France. It resulted from the merger of the refractory companies Plibrico and Lafarge Réfractaires in 2005, and combined its operations with HarbisonWalker International (HWI) in 2023.

Calderys India Refractories Limited (Operating in India) was an part of Associated Cement Companies (ACC) which is now under the Adani Group.

== History ==
=== Origins ===
William A.L. Schaefer, in 1914, developed the first monolithic refractory and created the Pliable Firebrick Company, which is also known as Plibrico. Plibrico developed its presence throughout Europe from 1930 to 1960, and was acquired by the group Imetal (future Imerys) in 1996.

Since the start of the 20th century, the Lafarge company has been developing refactory solutions. During the 1970s, Lafarge became France's leading refractory manufacturer. In 1980, Lafarge officially created Lafarge Réfractaires after its acquisition of the Belgian refractory company Groupe Coppée. In 2001, Lafarge created the company Materis to divest its building materials division, including Lafarge Réfractaires. In 2004, Imerys acquired Lafarge Réfractaires from Materis for 130 million euros.

=== 2005: Calderys ===
In 2005, Imerys merged Plibrico and Lafarge Réfractaires to create Calderys. Imerys pursued Calderys' global expansion with acquisitions such as ACE Refractories in India in 2007, Svenska Silikaverken AB and Valöns in Sweden in 2008, PT Indoporlen in Indonesia in 2013, S&B in 2015, and Kerneos in 2017.

In 2023, Imerys sold Calderys to a US private investment firm for 930 million euros. After the acquisition, Calderys became a standalone company. The fund also acquired HarbisonWalker International (HWI) and combined its operations with Calderys. Both companies were rebranded for unification purposes.

== Activities ==
Calderys is a refractory solutions provider headquartered in Paris, France. The company manufactures and distributes high temperature solutions, from refractories to casting fluxes and molding solutions. It operates 50 production sites in 30 countries (2025). Since 2023, the company combined its operations with HWI which became Calderys' brand for the Americas region. Michel Cornelissen has been President and CEO of Calderys, including HWI, since February 2023.
