= Trepobates panamensis =

Scientific classification
- Domain: Eukaryota
- Kingdom: Animalia
- Phylum: Arthropoda
- Class: Insecta
- Order: Hemiptera
- Suborder: Heteroptera
- Family: Gerridae
- Genus: Trepobates
- Species: T. panamensis

Binomial name
- Trepobates panamensis Drake & Hottes, 1952

Species of true bug

Trepobates panamensis is a species of water strider in the family Gerridae. It is found from southern Sonora, Mexico throughout Central America to Venezuela and Ecuador.
