= HarbisonWalker International =

Refractory solutions provider

- Company type: Private
- Industry: Refractory
- Founded: 1875
- Headquarters: Pittsburgh, PA, United States
- Area served: Americas
- Key people: Michel Cornelissen (President and CEO)
- Parent: Calderys
- Website: thinkhwi.com

HarbisonWalker International (HWI) is a refractory solutions provider headquartered in Pittsburgh, Pennsylvania, USA. HWI resulted from the merger of Harbison-Walker Refractories, A.P. Green and North American Refractories in 2002, forming the ANH Refractories Company which was renamed HarbisonWalker International in 2015. It combined its operations with Calderys in 2023 and became the group's brand for the Americas region.

== History ==
HarbisonWalker International (HWI) was created by the merger of Harbison-Walker, A.P. Green, and North American Refractories, all considered among the Big 5 of the firebrick industry during the first half of the 20th century. (Note: Along with Laclede Christy and General Refractories.)

The Harbison and Walker Company was founded in Pennsylvania in 1875 when Hay Walker Sr. and Samuel P. Harbison bought the company Star Fire Brick Company founded 10 years earlier. It became the Harbbison-Walker Refractories Company in 1902, merged with Dresser Industries in 1967 but demerged from Dresser in 1992. In 1999, Harbison-Walker managed 4,000 employees and 25 locations in 7 countries (15 production sites in the USA, 3 in Canada) when it was acquired by the Austrian conglomerate RHI Refractories.

Missouri-born Allen Percival Green (1875-1956) worked temporarily for Harbison-Walker Refractories Company, and then bought the Mexico Brick and Fire Clay Company in 1910. The A.P. Green Fire Brick Company grew strong during World War I, developed internationally between the wars, and grew again strongly after World War II. A.P. Green's company went public on the New York Stock Exchange in 1966, and was taken over by Gypsum (USG) in 1967. In 1998, A.P. Green was sold to the Austrian conglomerate RHI Refractories.

North American Refractories Co. (NARCO) was created in 1929 in Ohio through the merger of seven manufacturers of refractory solutions (including Canada-based North American Refractories, Ltd). NARCO grew through acquisitions the following decades, and was acquired by Eltra Corp. in 1965. Eltra Corp. was acquired by Allied Corp. in 1979, making NARCO part of Allied's chemical division. NARCO was then owned by Didier-Werke AG of Wiesbaden in 1989 and sold in 1995 to the Austrian group Veitsch-Radex in 1996, a subsidiary of RHI.

In 2002, many US refractory companies - including Harbison-Walker, A.P. Green, and North American Refractories - were embroiled in the abestos claims and filed for bankruptcy. RHI had combined its US subsidiaries under the RHI Americas banner, which spun off after the bankruptcy and became ANH Refractories Company in 2002.

In 2015, ANH Refractories changed its name to HarbisonWalker International (HWI) and engaged in its own digital transformation the following years. In 2023, a US private investment firm acquired HWI and combined its operations with its other refractory company Calderys, with the new name "HWI, a member of Calderys" and acting as the Americas' arm of Calderys.

== Activities ==
HarbisonWalker International (HWI) is a refractory solutions provider headquartered in Pittsburgh, Pennsylvania. The company manufactures and distributes high temperature solutions, from refractories to casting fluxes and molding solutions. R&D is headed at HWI's Innovation Center in West Mifflin, PA. The company operates under the commercial name "HWI, a member of Calderys" since it was combined with Calderys in 2023. Michel Cornelissen has been President and CEO of Calderys, including HWI, since February 2023.
