= Niles Firebrick =

Niles Firebrick was manufactured by the Niles Fire brick Company since it was created in 1872 by John Rhys Thomas until the company was sold in 1953 and completely shutdown in 1960. Capital to establish the company was provided by Lizzie B. Ward to construct a small plant across from the Old Ward Mill which was run by her husband James Ward. Thomas immigrated in 1868 from Carmarthenshire in Wales with his wife and son W. Aubrey Thomas who served as secretary of the company until he was appointed as representative to the U. S. Congress in 1904. The company was managed by another son, Thomas E. Thomas, after J.R. Thomas died unexpectedly in 1898. The Thomases returned the favor of their original capitalization by purchasing an iron blast furnace from James Ward when he went bankrupt in 1879. Using their knowledge of firebrick they were able to make this small furnace profitable. Later they used it to showcase the value of adding hot blast to a furnace using 3 ovens packed full of firebrick. The furnace was managed by another son, John Morgan Thomas.

Fire brick was first invented in 1822 by William Weston Young in the Vale of Neath in Wales, the county just east of Llanelli where the Thomas family lived before emigrating to Niles. It is recorded that Firebrick was made in the Llanelli area in 1870 but the market was highly cyclical and it was difficult to make a living at it.

From 1937 to 1941 the company worked to prevent the United Brick Workers Union (CIO) from organizing the workers in preference for an independent union favored by management. The CIO union prevailed. In spite of this episode the company had good relations with the employees and tried to keep them employed during economic downturns. The "Clingans" mentioned in that referenced interview were Margaret Thomas Clingan, a daughter and John Rhys Thomas Clingan, a grandson, who took over management of the Company when T.E. Thomas died in 1920.

Patrick J. Sheehan worked various jobs at Niles Fire Brick Company from age 13 up until 1897 when he was appointed superintendent of the plant. When Sheehan started with the company they occupied a plant covering a floor space of 3,600 square feet, two kilns, and the output was 640,000 bricks per year. The plant was moved to Langley street eighteen months afterward, and the output increased to 1,200,000. This Langley street works has constantly added to each year, until the output was 6 million, and in 1905 they built the "Falcon" plant on the site formerly occupied by the Langley street plant, which doubled production to 12 million per year. By 1955 the output was 25 million. The work of molding and firing brick was highly labor-intensive. Immigrants from Southern States and European countries, especially Italy, were sought to perform labor under difficult working conditions.

An article in the March-April "The Niles Register" of the Niles Historical Society discusses the history of the headquarters of the company at 216 Langely Street with a pattern shop in the back where skilled workers created the molds for custom bricks ordered by the mills in the 1902- 1912 period. After that the pattern shop was used by the Sons of Italy and later by the Bagnoli-Irpino Club. This was a result of the large percentage of immigrants from the Bagnoli-Irpino area in Italy. One of the founders of the club was Lawrence Pallante, an early immigrant from that area and presumably an ancestor of the reference articles. Immigration from that area began in 1880 and extended to about 1960.
