= Hyner Run =

River in Pennsylvania, United States

Coordinates: 41°19′52″N 77°38′51″W

Hyner Run is a tributary of the West Branch Susquehanna River in Clinton and Lycoming Counties in Pennsylvania in the United States. The run is 4.2 miles (6.8 km) long, flows generally southwest, and its watershed is 87.9 square miles (227.7 km^{2}) in area.

== See also ==
- List of rivers of Pennsylvania
- Tangascootack Creek
