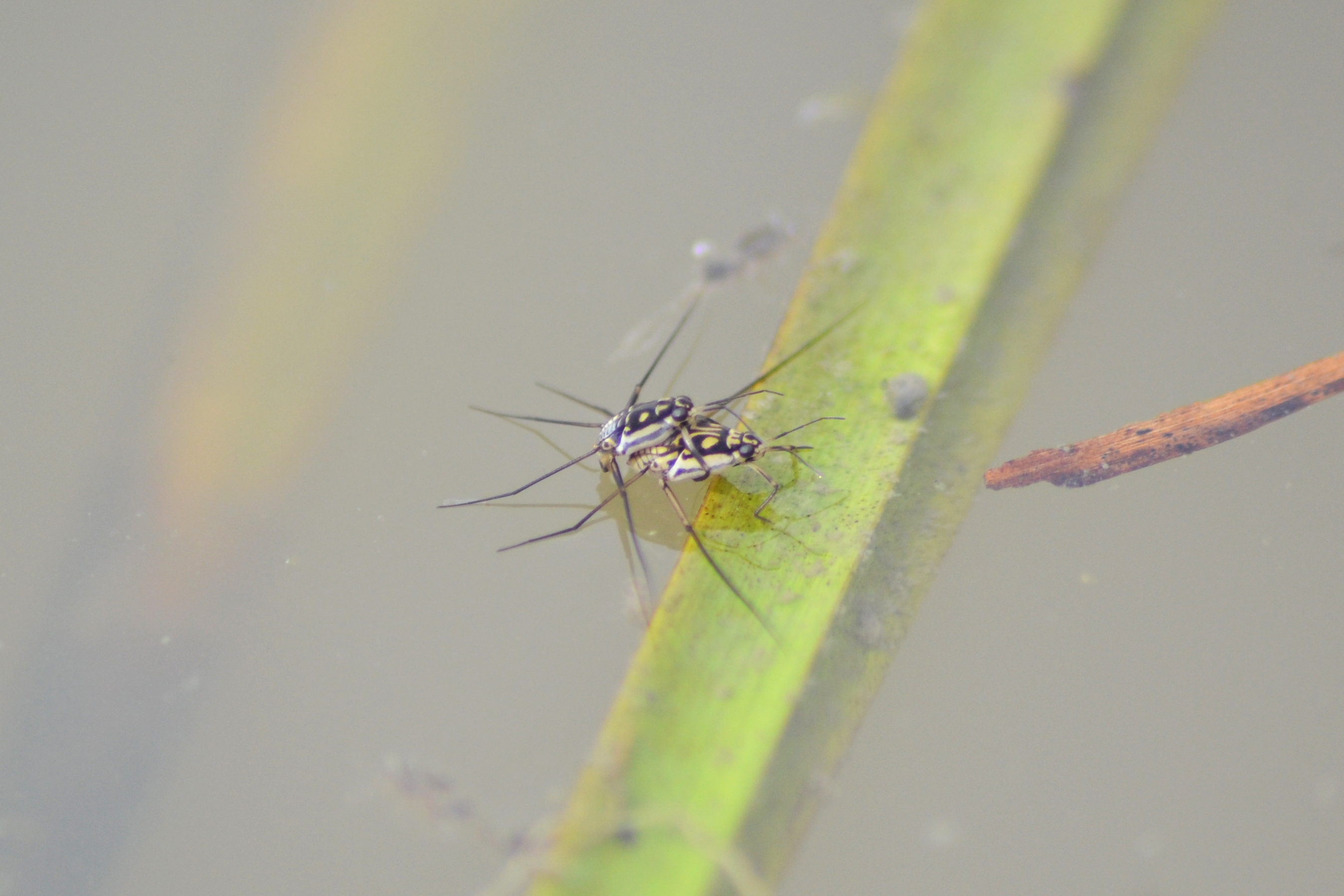

Scientific classification
- Domain: Eukaryota
- Kingdom: Animalia
- Phylum: Arthropoda
- Class: Insecta
- Order: Hemiptera
- Suborder: Heteroptera
- Family: Gerridae
- Genus: Trepobates
- Species: T. subnitidus

Binomial name
- Trepobates subnitidus Esaki, 1926

Synonyms
- Trepobates citatus Drake & Chapman

= Trepobates subnitidus =

Species of true bug

Trepobates subnitidus is a species of water strider in the family Gerridae. It is found in North America.

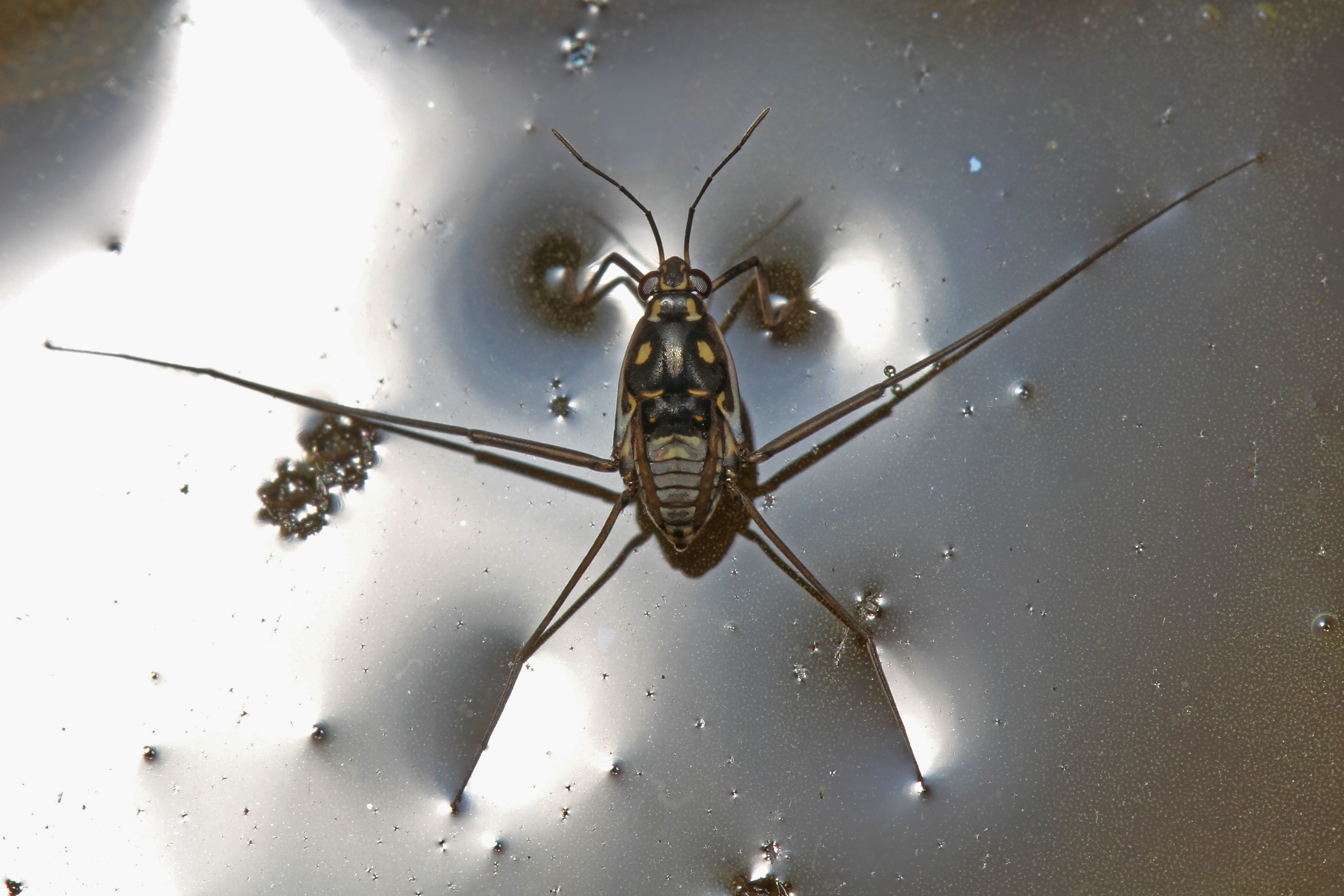
