= Mount Union Historic District =

Historic district in Pennsylvania, United States

- U.S. National Register of Historic Places
- U.S. Historic district
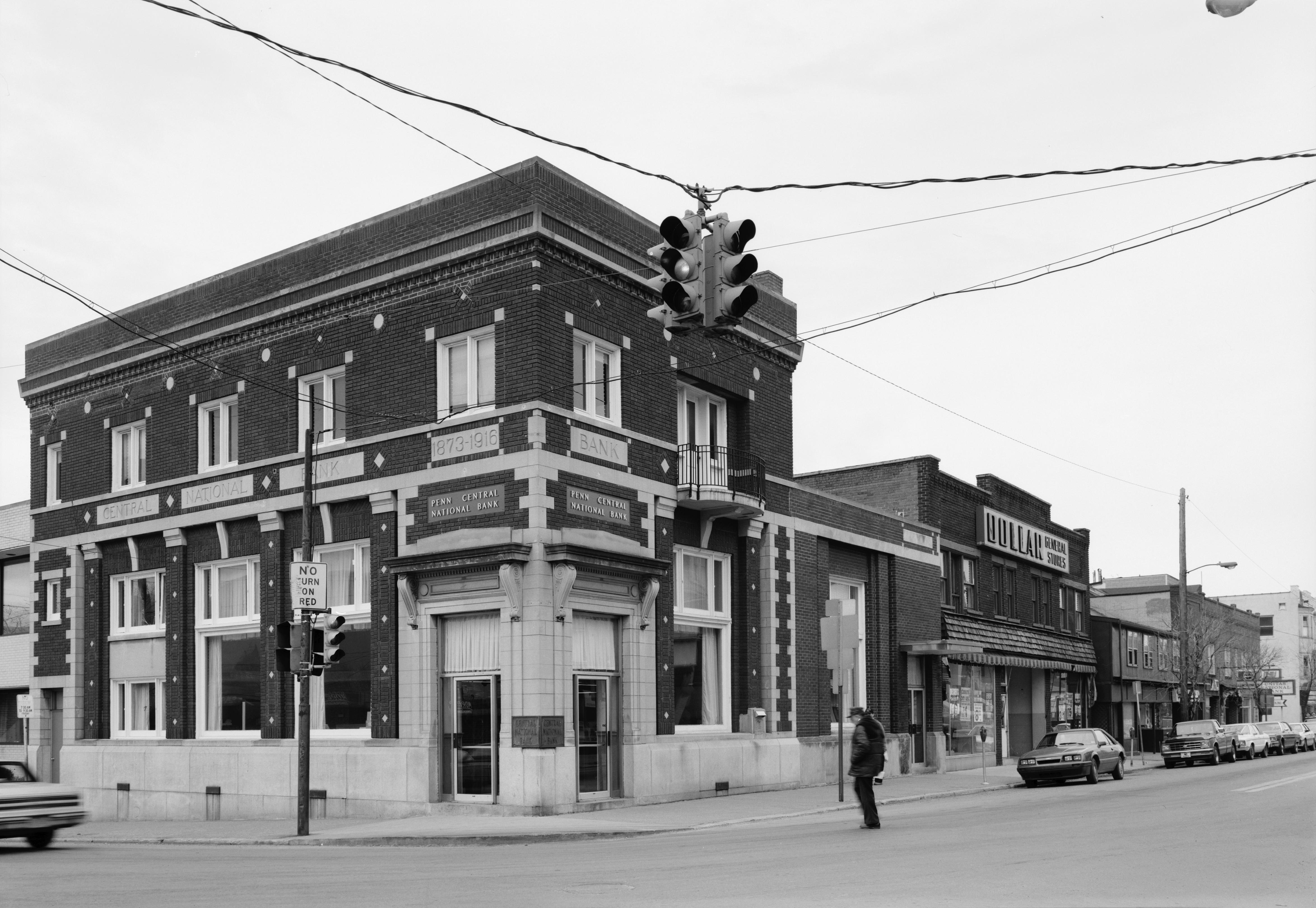
- Shirley and Jefferson Streets, February 1990

- Location within Pennsylvania Location within the United States
- Location: Roughly bounded by Water and Greene Sts., the I.O.O.F Cemetery, Washington and Lafayette Sts., Shirley Township, Mount Union, Pennsylvania
- Coordinates: 40°22′57″N 78°10′22″W
- Area: 180 acres (73 ha)
- Architect: Allen S. Welch, Elmer D. Welch
- Architectural style: Late Victorian, Late 19th And Early 20th Century American Movements, Modern Movement
- NRHP reference No.: 94000516
- Added to NRHP: May 26, 1994

Mount Union Historic District is a national historic district located at Mount Union in Huntingdon County, Pennsylvania. The district includes 58 contributing buildings, 3 contributing sites, and 1 contributing structure in the central business district and surrounding residential areas of Mount Union. Notable buildings include the Federal-style John Shaver House (1818), Shapiro Theater (1915), T.A. Appleby Store and House (c. 1870), Kenmar Hotel (1880s, 1904), Penn Central National Bank (1916), Peduzzi's and the Weller Building (1913-1914), Pennsylvania Railroad Freight Depot (1914), St. Luke's Evangelical Lutheran Church (1904-1905), First United Methodist Church (1925-1926), St. Catherine of Siena Roman Catholic Church (1912-1913), Mount Union Elementary School (1923-1924), and U.S. Post Office (1936). The contributing sites include the I.O.O.F. community cemetery, founded in 1872, and the former Victoria Park. Located in the district and listed separately is the Harbison-Walker Refractories Company complex.

It was listed on the National Register of Historic Places in 1994.
