= Trepobates knighti =

Scientific classification
- Domain: Eukaryota
- Kingdom: Animalia
- Phylum: Arthropoda
- Class: Insecta
- Order: Hemiptera
- Suborder: Heteroptera
- Family: Gerridae
- Genus: Trepobates
- Species: T. knighti

Binomial name
- Trepobates knighti Drake & Harris, 1928

Species of true bug

Trepobates knighti is a species of water strider in the family Gerridae. It is found in the central United States from Texas and Louisiana north to South Dakota, Minnesota, and Illinois.
