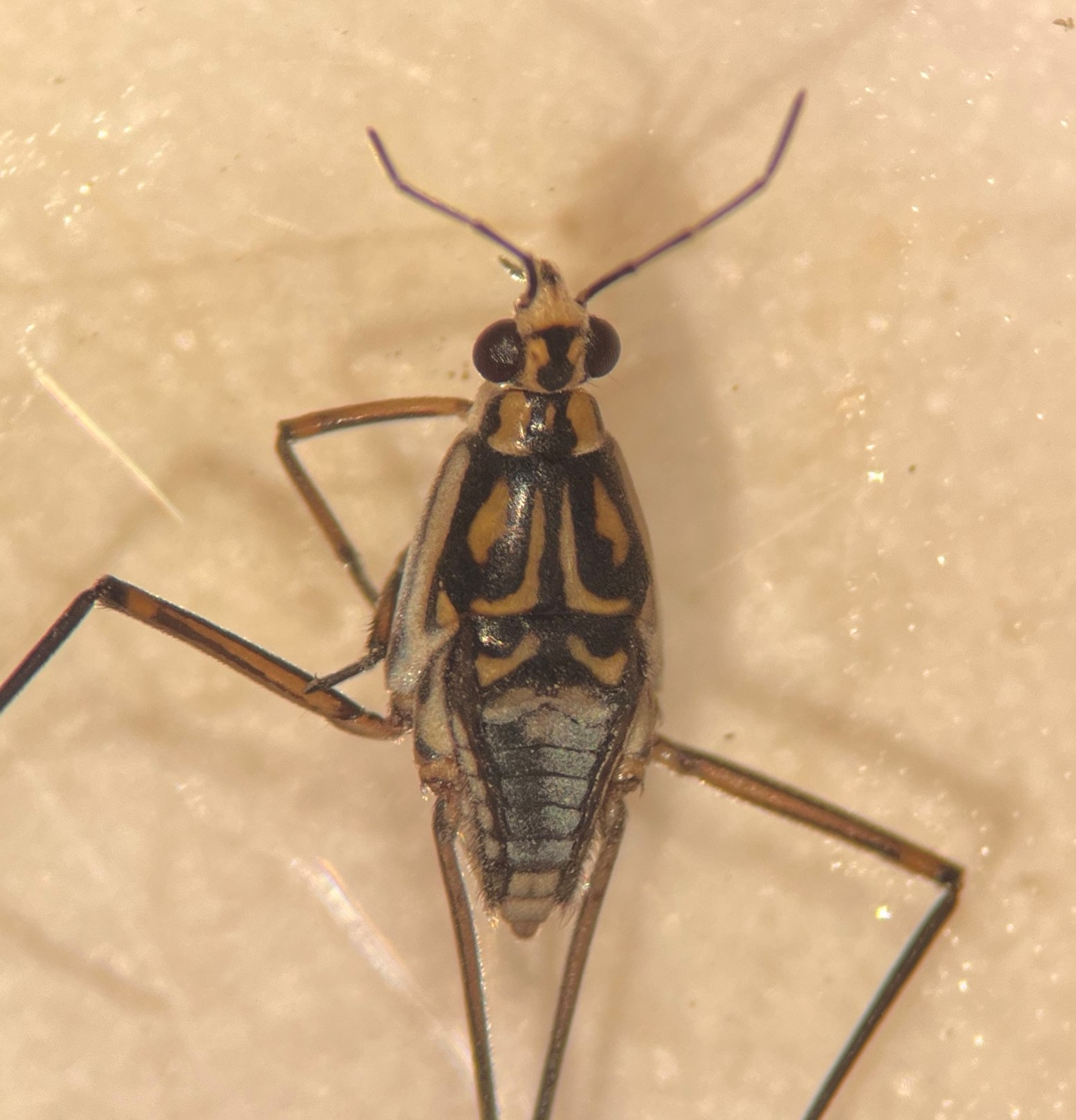

Scientific classification
- Domain: Eukaryota
- Kingdom: Animalia
- Phylum: Arthropoda
- Class: Insecta
- Order: Hemiptera
- Suborder: Heteroptera
- Family: Gerridae
- Genus: Trepobates
- Species: T. taylori

Binomial name
- Trepobates taylori Kirkaldy, 1899

Synonyms
- Trepobates comitialis

= Trepobates taylori =

Species of true bug

Trepobates taylori is a species of water strider in the family Gerridae. It is found from southern Texas, throughout Mexico and Central America, the Caribbean region, and South America, reaching as far south as northern Argentina.
