= Trepobates polhemi =

Scientific classification
- Domain: Eukaryota
- Kingdom: Animalia
- Phylum: Arthropoda
- Class: Insecta
- Order: Hemiptera
- Suborder: Heteroptera
- Family: Gerridae
- Genus: Trepobates
- Species: T. polhemi

Binomial name
- Trepobates polhemi Kittle, 1982

Species of true bug

Trepobates polhemi is a species of water strider in the family Gerridae. It is found in Mexico from southern Sonora to Guerrero.
