= Seward H. Williams =

American politician (1870–1922)

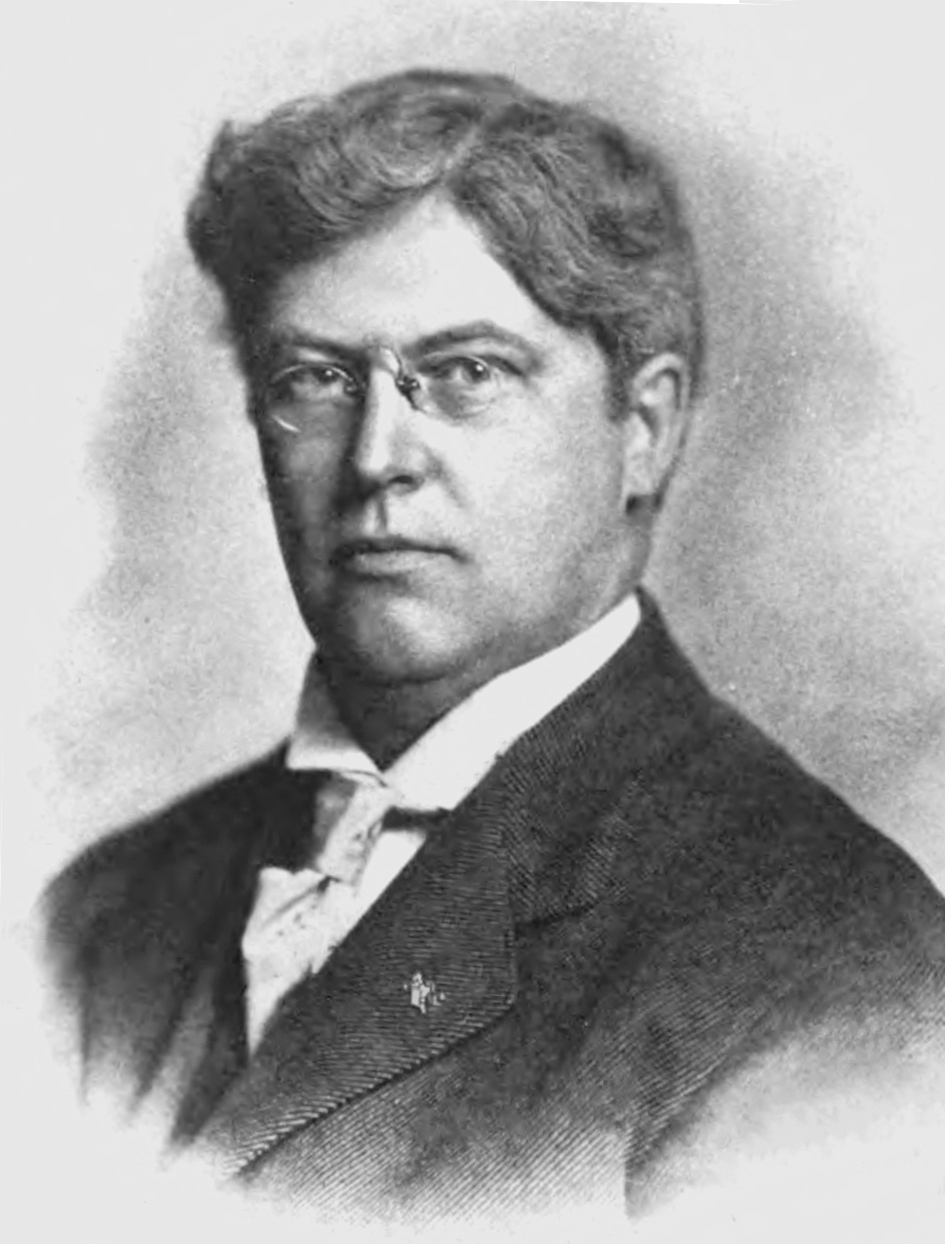
- Williams c. 1910

Member of the U.S. House of Representatives from Ohio's 14th district
- In office March 4, 1915 – March 4, 1917
- Preceded by: William Graves Sharp
- Succeeded by: Elsworth R. Bathrick

Member of the Ohio House of Representatives from the Lorain County district
- In office January 2, 1911 – January 3, 1915 Serving with Earl N. Gibbs
- Preceded by: Earl N. Gibbs
- Succeeded by: Anthony Niedling

Personal details
- Born: November 7, 1870 Amsterdam, New York, US
- Died: September 2, 1922 (aged 51) Lorain, Ohio, US
- Resting place: Elmwood Cemetery
- Party: Republican
- Spouse: Sarah Jennette Reynolds
- Children: two
- Education: Williams College; Princeton University; Washington and Lee University School of Law
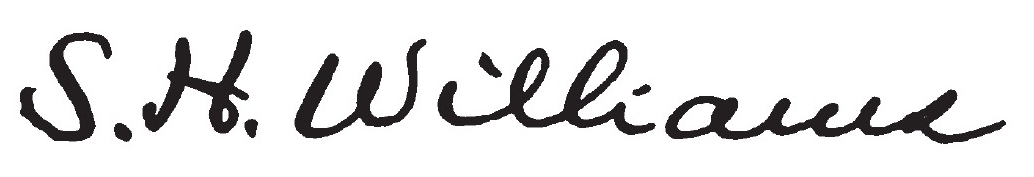
- Signature

Seward Henry Williams (November 7, 1870 – September 2, 1922) was an American lawyer and politician who served one term as a U.S. representative from Ohio from 1915 to 1917.

== Biography ==
Born in Amsterdam, New York, Williams attended the common schools, the Amsterdam Academy, Williams College, Williamstown, Massachusetts, and Princeton College. He was graduated in law from Washington and Lee University, Lexington, Virginia, in 1895. He was admitted to the bar in 1895 and commenced practice the same year. City solicitor of Lorain, Ohio, from 1901 to 1904. He served as member of the State house of representatives 1910-1913.

=== Congress ===
Williams was elected as a Republican to the Sixty-fourth Congress (March 4, 1915 – March 3, 1917). He was an unsuccessful candidate for reelection in 1916 to the Sixty-fifth Congress.

=== Later career and death ===
He resumed the practice of law. He died in Lorain, Ohio, September 2, 1922. He was interred in Elmwood Cemetery.

Williams married Sarah Jennette Reynolds of Lorain at Cleveland, Ohio, on September 29, 1897. They had two children.

He died on September 2, 1922, in Lorain, Ohio.

== Memberships ==
Williams was a Knights Templar Mason and a member of the Knights of Pythias.

== Sources ==
- Media related to Seward H. Williams at Wikimedia Commons
- United States Congress. "Seward H. Williams (id: W000535)". Biographical Directory of the United States Congress.

U.S. House of Representatives
Preceded by William G. Sharp	Member of the U.S. House of Representatives from Ohio's 14th congressional district 1915-1917	Succeeded by Elsworth R. Bathrick
