= Trepobates becki =

Scientific classification
- Domain: Eukaryota
- Kingdom: Animalia
- Phylum: Arthropoda
- Class: Insecta
- Order: Hemiptera
- Suborder: Heteroptera
- Family: Gerridae
- Genus: Trepobates
- Species: T. becki

Binomial name
- Trepobates becki Drake & Harris, 1932

Species of true bug

Trepobates becki is a species of water strider in the family Gerridae. It is found in Arizona and southern California in the United States, south throughout much of Mexico.
