= Trepobates floridensis =

Scientific classification
- Domain: Eukaryota
- Kingdom: Animalia
- Phylum: Arthropoda
- Class: Insecta
- Order: Hemiptera
- Suborder: Heteroptera
- Family: Gerridae
- Genus: Trepobates
- Species: T. floridensis

Binomial name
- Trepobates floridensis Drake & Harris, 1928

Species of true bug

Trepobates floridensis is a species of water strider in the family Gerridae. It is found throughout Florida into southern Georgia and west to Mississippi.
