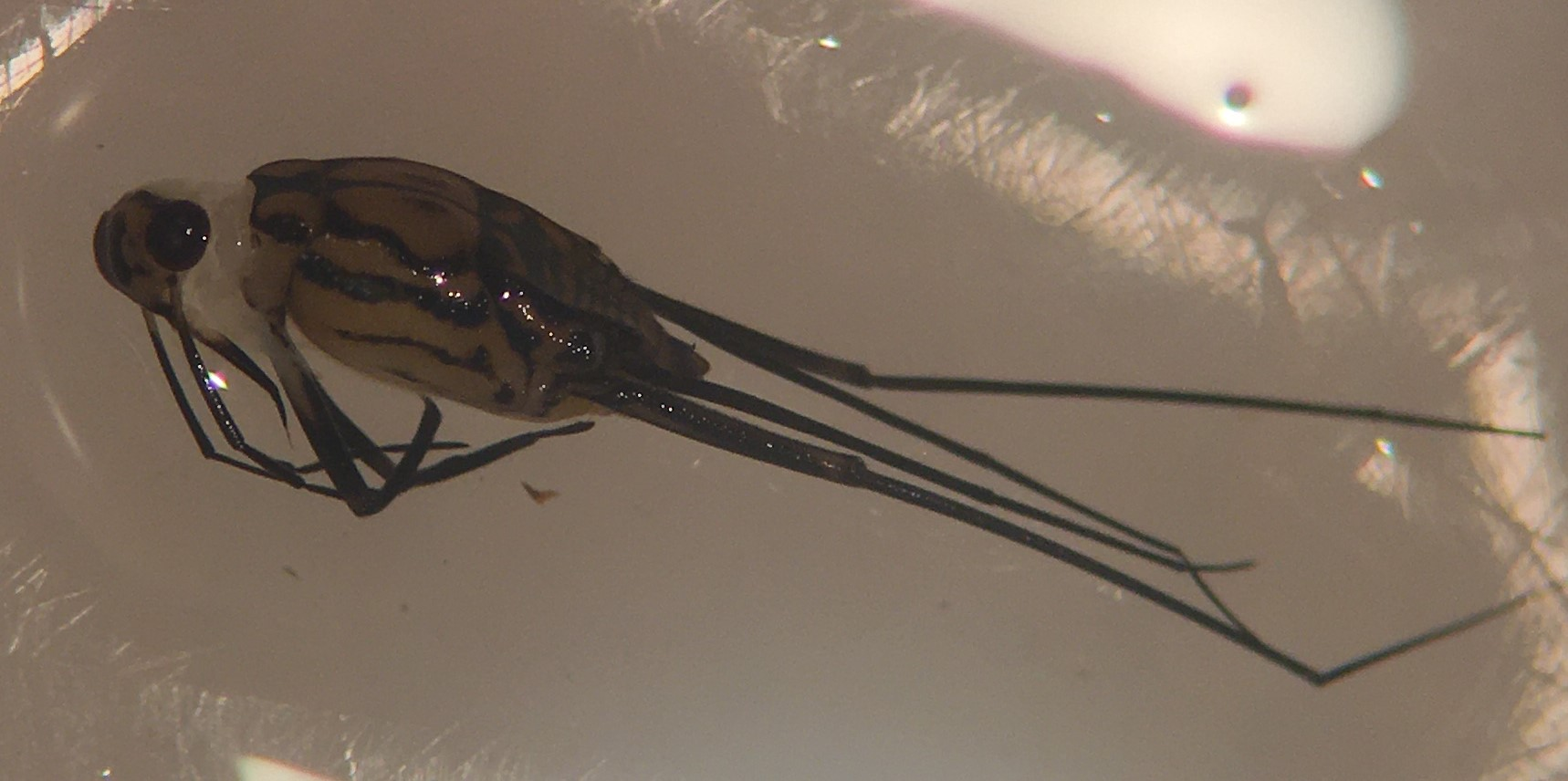

Scientific classification
- Domain: Eukaryota
- Kingdom: Animalia
- Phylum: Arthropoda
- Class: Insecta
- Order: Hemiptera
- Suborder: Heteroptera
- Family: Gerridae
- Genus: Trepobates
- Species: T. pictus

Binomial name
- Trepobates pictus (Herrich-schaeffer, 1847)

Synonyms
- Halobates pictus Herrich-Schaeffer, 1847

= Trepobates pictus =

Species of true bug

Trepobates pictus is a species of water strider in the family Gerridae. It is found in eastern North America from Texas to Florida, Illinois, Maine, and Ontario.
