= W. Aubrey Thomas =

American politician (1866–1951)

William Aubrey Thomas
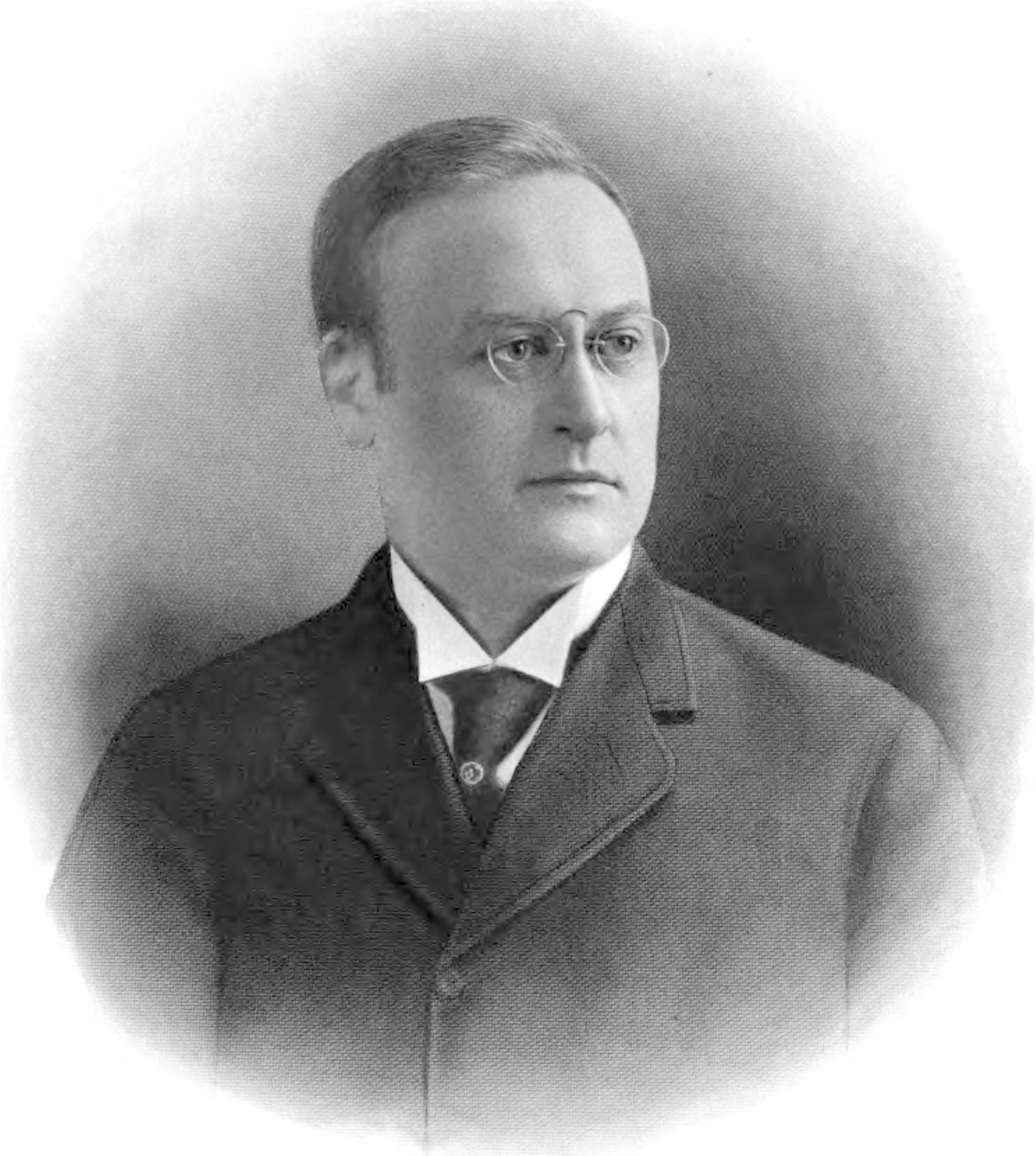

Member of the U.S. House of Representatives from Ohio's 19th district
- In office November 8, 1904 – March 3, 1911
- Preceded by: Charles W. F. Dick
- Succeeded by: Elsworth R. Bathrick

Personal details
- Born: June 7, 1866 Y Bynea, Wales
- Died: September 8, 1951 (aged 85) Talladega, Alabama, US
- Resting place: Oak Hill Cemetery, Youngstown
- Party: Republican
- Education: Mount Union College; Rensselaer Polytechnic Institute
- Occupation: Metallurgist
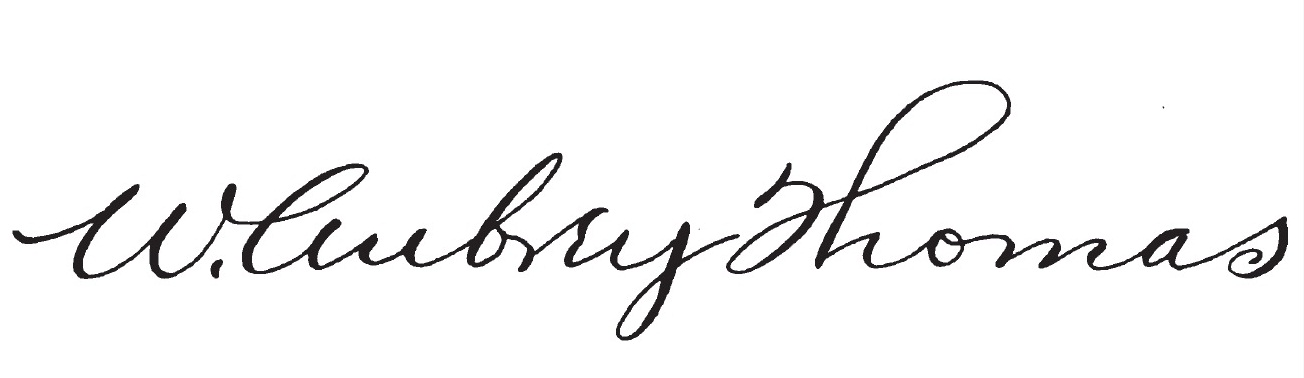
- Signature

William Aubrey Thomas (June 7, 1866 – September 8, 1951) was an American scientist and politician who served as a U.S. representative from Ohio from 1904 to 1911.

== Biography ==
Born in Y Bynea, near Llanelli, Carmarthenshire, Wales, Thomas immigrated to the United States in 1868 with his parents, who settled in Niles, Ohio. He attended the public schools of Niles, Mount Union College, and Rensselaer Polytechnic Institute, where he majored in metallurgical chemistry.

He was an analytical chemist in Niles from 1886 to 1888 and was engaged in the iron and steel business. He served as president of The Mahoning Valley Steel Company and as secretary and director of the Niles Firebrick Co.

Thomas was elected as a Republican to the Fifty-eighth Congress to fill the vacancy caused by the resignation of Charles W. F. Dick on this election to the Senate. He was reelected to the Fifty-ninth, Sixtieth, and Sixty-first Congresses and served from November 8, 1904, to March 3, 1911. He was an unsuccessful candidate for reelection in 1910 to the Sixty-second Congress.

He moved to Alabama in 1918 and continued his interest in the manufacture of iron, steel, and firebrick. He served as president of the Jenifer Iron Co. He died in Talladega, Alabama, on September 8, 1951, aged 85. He was interred in Oak Hill Cemetery in Youngstown, Ohio.

Thomas became a Mason in 1887, and was the youngest Master in Ohio when he led his lodge for two terms. He became a member of the Elks in 1892 and was a Presbyterian.

U.S. House of Representatives
Preceded by Charles W. F. Dick	Member of the U.S. House of Representatives from Ohio's 19th congressional district 1904–1911	Succeeded by Ellsworth R. Bathrick
