= The Mahoning Valley Steel Company =

The Mahoning Valley Steel Company was formally organized on July 12, 1916, with a capital investment of $600,000. The original officers were Jacob D. Waddell, president; T. E. Thomas, vice president and treasurer; W. Aubrey Thomas, secretary; directors, John M. Thomas and M. T. Clingan and the officers named above. An interesting family dynamic was that Jacob D. Waddel married Mary Ann Thomas in Dec. 12, 1917, making him the brother-in-law to the other directors, all children of John Rhys Thomas.

The company erected a sheet mill plant at Niles, Ohio with an annual capacity of 48,000 tons of black steel sheets, and made improvements and extensions which permitted of the production of 12,000 tons of galvanized sheets per year. The plant employed approximately 425 men, and had an annual payroll of about $960,000. Offices were maintained at Niles, New York City, Chicago, West Hamilton (Ontario), and St. Louis. This company began a comprehensive housing plan, and invested by 1921 about $50,000 in this way, and would extend its housing operations as needed. It isn't figurative speech to say the steel mills created neighborhoods and cities. It's actually quite literal. Steel companies had real estate subsidiaries that built homes for employees, and in the case of McDonald, Ohio (Near Niles), US Steel built the entire town, including its city hall, fire/police station and parks.

During WWII John Hosack as Vice President and treasurer testified before the Truman Commission giving details about the operations of the company. Just after World War II, there was a serious shortage of steel. General Electric needed access for steel for its growing electric supply division. Mahoning Valley Steel was a hand rolling mill, also called a back and forth mill, which did not make the type of steel needed by GE, but the mill did have access to its quota of steel, which GE did need. The president at that time, John P. Hosack, made a deal to sell the company to GE if they agreed to build an Electrical conduit plant on the site, which maintained jobs in Niles. General Electric was forced to divest the supply company in 2006 for anti-trust reasons, and the plant was closed by the new owner.
