= Trepobates inermis =

Scientific classification
- Domain: Eukaryota
- Kingdom: Animalia
- Phylum: Arthropoda
- Class: Insecta
- Order: Hemiptera
- Suborder: Heteroptera
- Family: Gerridae
- Genus: Trepobates
- Species: T. inermis

Binomial name
- Trepobates inermis Esaki, 1926

Species of true bug

Trepobates inermis is a species of water strider in the family Gerridae. It is found in the eastern United States from Florida to Michigan and Massachusetts, as well as Ontario, Canada.
