= Ellsworth Raymond Bathrick =

American politician

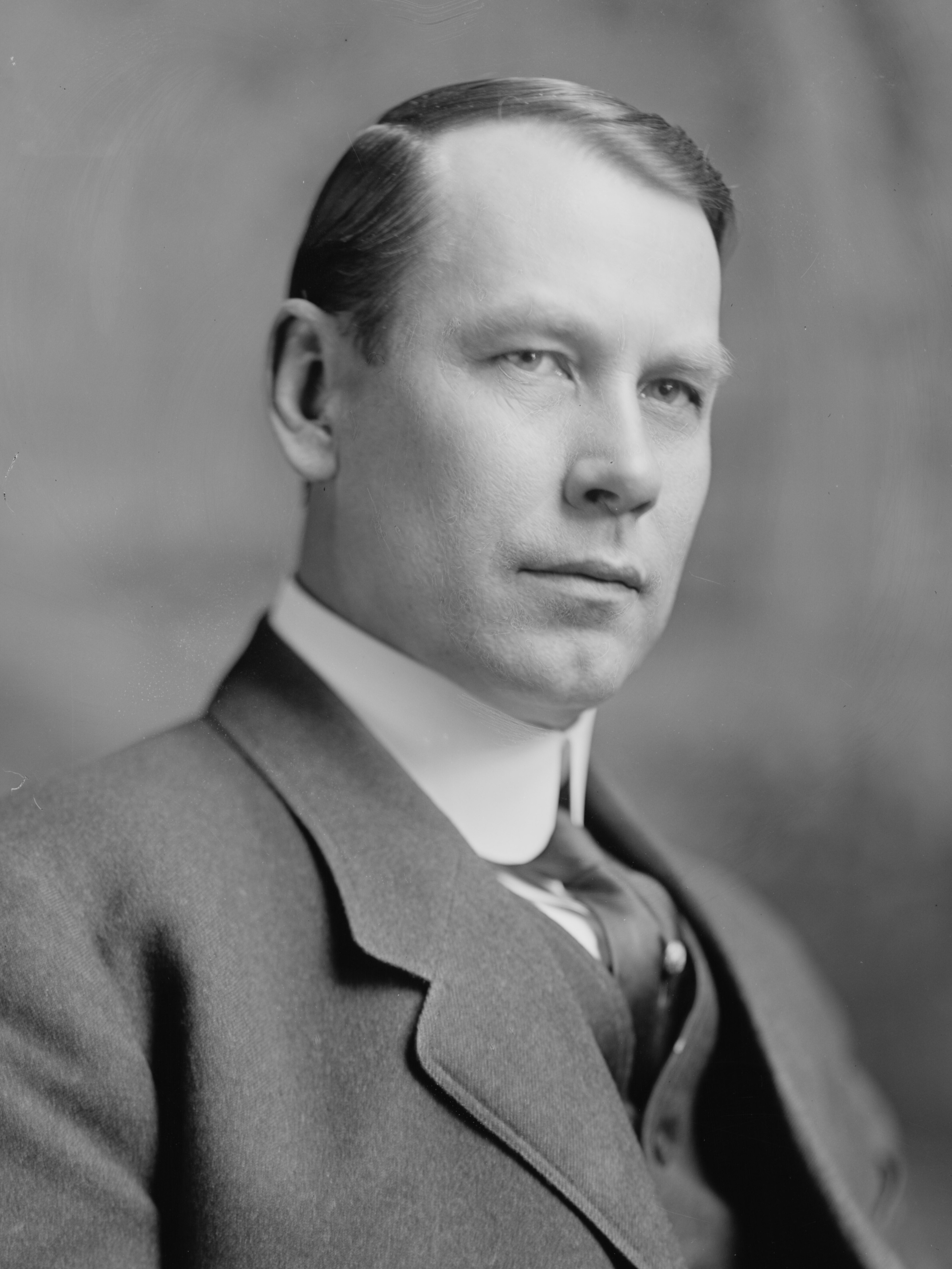

Member of the U.S. House of Representatives from Ohio
- In office March 4, 1911 – March 3, 1915
- Preceded by: W. Aubrey Thomas
- Succeeded by: John G. Cooper
- Constituency: 19th district
- In office March 4, 1917 – December 23, 1917
- Preceded by: Seward H. Williams
- Succeeded by: Martin Luther Davey
- Constituency: 14th district

Personal details
- Born: January 6, 1863 Pontiac, Michigan, U.S.
- Died: December 23, 1917 (aged 54) Akron, Ohio, U.S.
- Resting place: Glendale Cemetery
- Party: Democratic
- Spouse: May L. Clark (m. 1889)

Ellsworth Raymond Bathrick (January 6, 1863 – December 23, 1917) was an American politician who served as a U.S. representative from Ohio.

== Biography ==
Born January 6, 1863, near Pontiac, Michigan, to Sumner Bathrick and Louisa Bathrick, he married May L. Clark in 1889. Bathrick attended the country schools and was graduated from the Pontiac High School.

He moved to New York City in 1890 and engaged in the importation of edible oils. In the 1890s, he was a reporter for a Cleveland newspaper. He moved to Akron, Ohio, in 1900 and engaged in the real estate business.

Bathrick was elected as a Democrat to the Sixty-second and Sixty-third Congresses (March 4, 1911 – March 3, 1915). Because of gerrymandering, he was an unsuccessful candidate for reelection in 1914 to the Sixty-fourth Congress. He resumed his former business pursuits.

Bathrick was elected to the Sixty-fifth Congress and served from March 4, 1917, until his death in Akron, Ohio, December 23, 1917. Though extremely ill Bathrick continued his representation of Ohio for six months until the close of session in October.

Bathrick died on December 23, 1917, in Akron, Ohio. He was interred in Glendale Cemetery. Martin Luther Davey was elected to fill his congressional term.

== Legacy ==
Bathrick was an ardent advocate for a large Navy, being known on the hill as "Battleship Bath". He was a great advocate of Rural Credits, though the legislation was passed during the Sixty-fourth Congress, he was credited by his peers as being a great influence in the legislation.

== Books by Ellsworth R. Bathrick ==
In his youth, Bathrick was a reporter for a Cleveland Newspaper. While a reporter, he turned his hand to writing children's stories. Being dissatisfied with the story, he placed it in a trunk, only to find it again around 1911. A friend convinced him to send it to a publisher, who made a few recommendations for changes and recommending it for publication. Bathrick, being ill, retired for the winter in Florida for his health. While there, he reworked the story and sent it back to the publisher, who published it not long after he died.

- Please Don't Worry (Needs investigation)
- The Magic Salt: The Fairy People (1918)
- The Magic Salt: The Soldier Bees (1918)
- The Magic Salt: The Wand of Power (1918)
- The Magic Salt: The Great Day (1918)

== Sources ==
- United States Congress. "Ellsworth Raymond Bathrick (id: B000240)". Biographical Directory of the United States Congress.

== See also ==
- List of members of the United States Congress who died in office (1900–1949)

U.S. House of Representatives
Preceded by W. Aubrey Thomas	Member of the U.S. House of Representatives from Ohio's 19th congressional district 1911-1915	Succeeded by John G. Cooper
Preceded by Seward H. Williams	Member of the U.S. House of Representatives from Ohio's 14th congressional district 1917	Succeeded by Martin L. Davey
