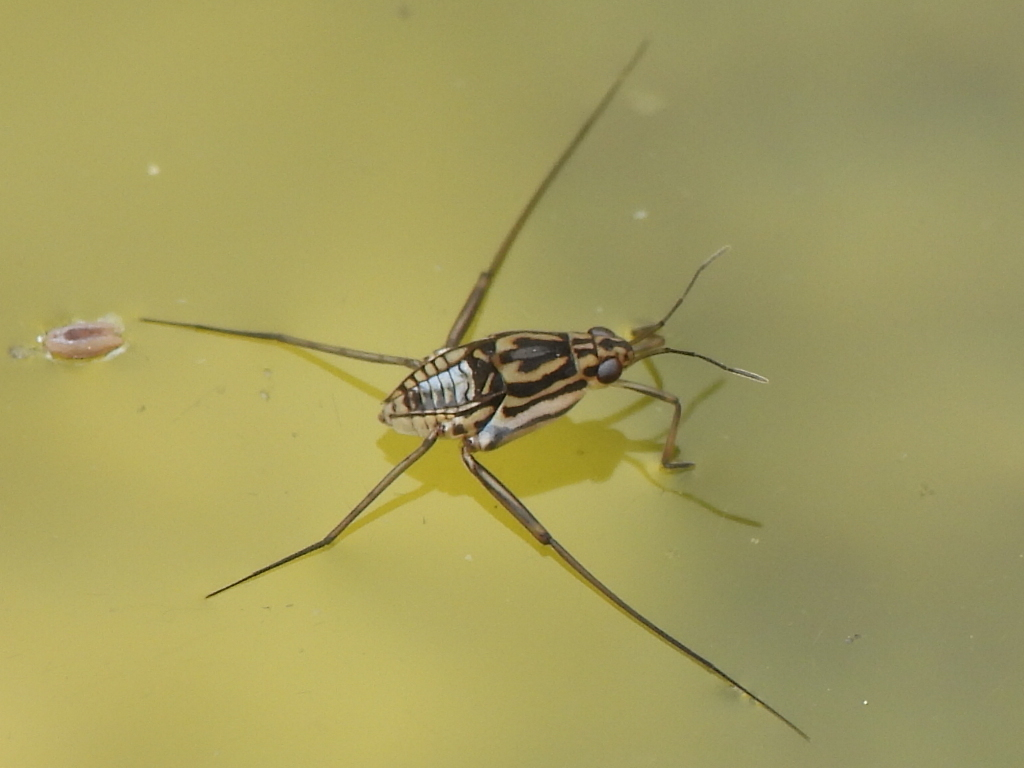

Scientific classification
- Domain: Eukaryota
- Kingdom: Animalia
- Phylum: Arthropoda
- Class: Insecta
- Order: Hemiptera
- Suborder: Heteroptera
- Family: Gerridae
- Genus: Trepobates
- Species: T. carri

Binomial name
- Trepobates carri Kittle, 1982

= Trepobates carri =

Species of true bug

Trepobates carri is a species of water strider in the family Gerridae. It is found in southern Texas, around the Gulf of Mexico coast in Mexico, south to Honduras, and in Cuba and Jamaica.
