= Trepobates trepidus =

Scientific classification
- Domain: Eukaryota
- Kingdom: Animalia
- Phylum: Arthropoda
- Class: Insecta
- Order: Hemiptera
- Suborder: Heteroptera
- Family: Gerridae
- Genus: Trepobates
- Species: T. trepidus

Binomial name
- Trepobates trepidus Drake & Harris, 1928

Species of true bug

Trepobates trepidus is a species of water strider in the family Gerridae. It is found in from southern Arizona throughout Mexico and Central America to Venezuela and Ecuador.
