= Trepobates vazquezae =

Scientific classification
- Domain: Eukaryota
- Kingdom: Animalia
- Phylum: Arthropoda
- Class: Insecta
- Order: Hemiptera
- Suborder: Heteroptera
- Family: Gerridae
- Genus: Trepobates
- Species: T. vazquezae

Binomial name
- Trepobates vazquezae Drake & Hottes, 1951

Species of true bug

Trepobates vazquezae is a species of water striders in the family Gerridae. It is found on the west coast of Mexico from Nayarit to Guerrero.
