= Colebrook Township, Pennsylvania =

Township in Pennsylvania, US

Coordinates: 41°12′30″N 77°29′49″W

- Township
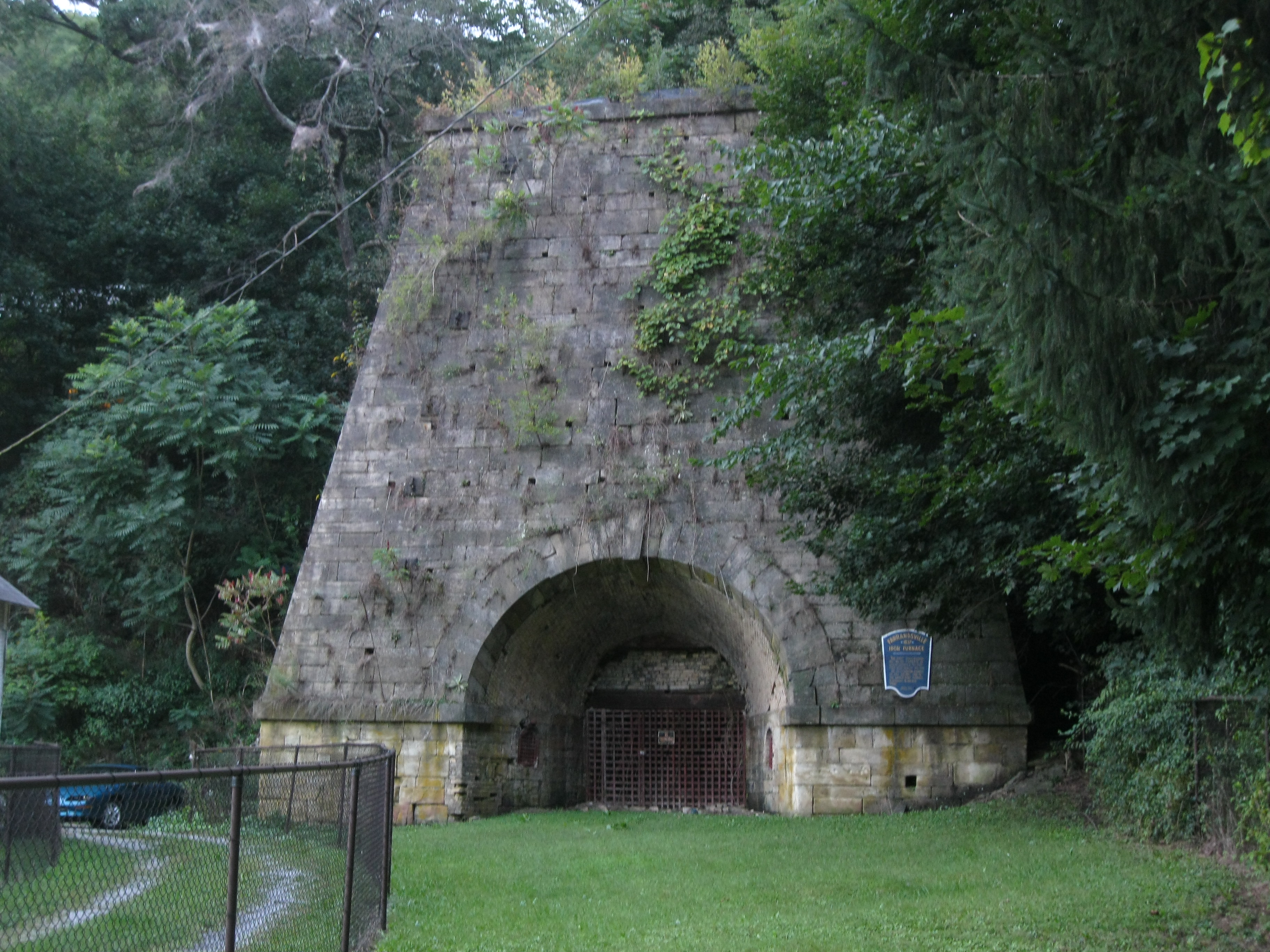
- The Farrandsville Iron Furnace in Colebrook Township

- Location in Clinton County and the state of Pennsylvania.
- Country: United States
- State: Pennsylvania
- County: Clinton
- Settled: 1777
- Incorporated: Before 1839

Area
  - Total: 18.63 sq mi (48.25 km^{2})
  - Land: 18.13 sq mi (46.96 km^{2})
  - Water: 0.50 sq mi (1.29 km^{2})

Population (2020)
  - Total: 196 ▼
  - Estimate (2021): 196
  - Density: 11.1/sq mi (4.28/km^{2})
- FIPS code: 42-035-14960
- Website: colebrooktwp.com

Colebrook Township is a township in Clinton County, Pennsylvania, United States. The population was 196 at the 2020 census.

== History ==
The Farrandsville Iron Furnace was listed on the National Register of Historic Places in 1991.

== Geography ==
According to the United States Census Bureau, the township has a total area of 18.6 square miles (48.2 km^{2}), of which 18.1 square miles (47.0 km^{2}) is land and 0.50 square miles (1.3 km^{2}), or 2.67%, is water.

== Demographics ==
Historical population
Census	Pop.	Note	%±
1980	244		—
1990	180		−26.2%
2000	179		−0.6%
2010	199		11.2%
2020	196		−1.5%
2021 (est.)	196		0.0%

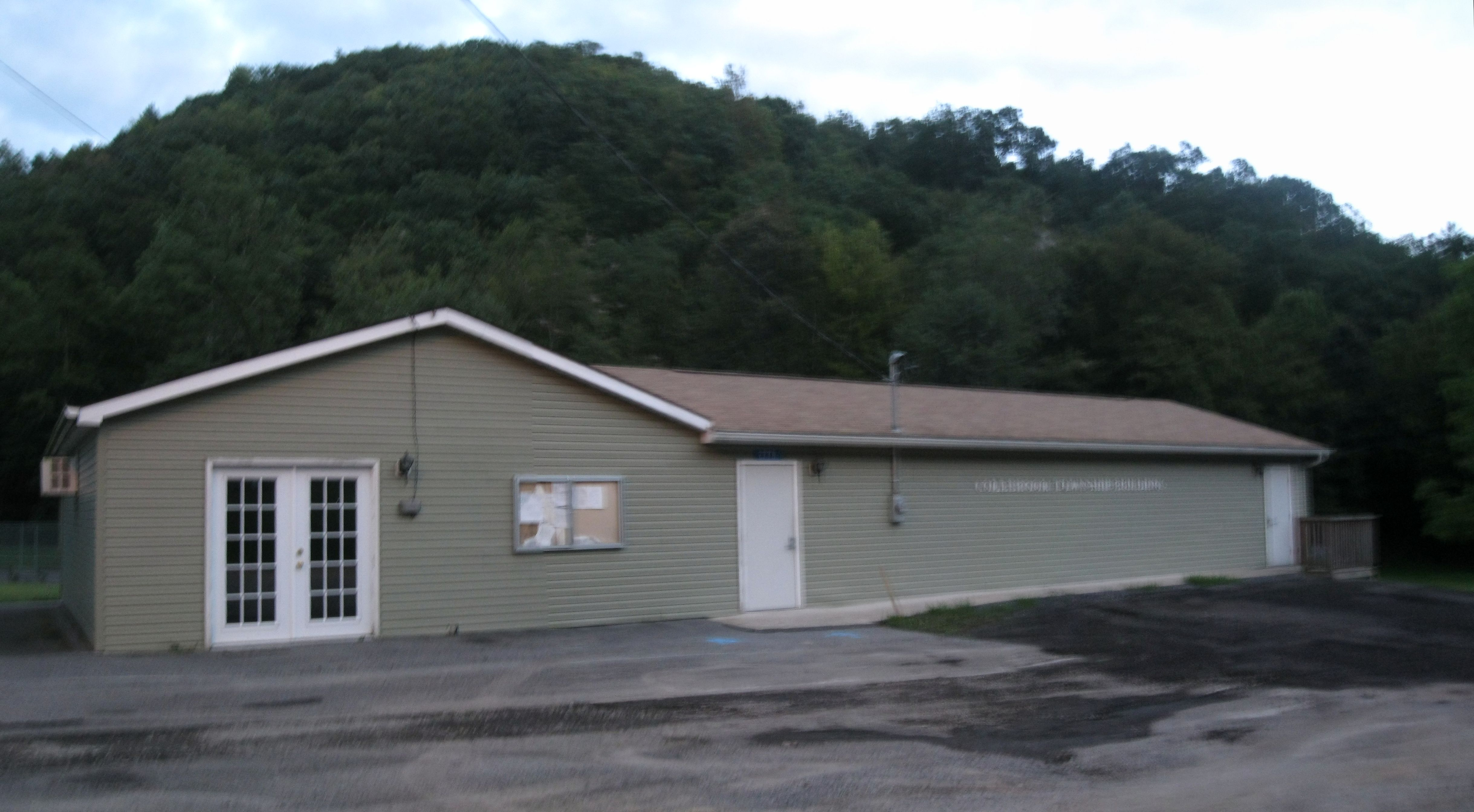
Colebrook Town Hall

As of the census of 2000, there were 179 people, 56 households, and 45 families residing in the township. The population density was 9.8 people per square mile (3.8/km^{2}). There were 92 housing units at an average density of 5.0/sq mi (1.9/km^{2}). The racial makeup of the township was 97.21% White, 0.56% Native American, 0.56% from other races, and 1.68% from two or more races. Hispanic or Latino of any race were 0.56% of the population.

There were 56 households, out of which 26.8% had children under the age of 18 living with them, 71.4% were married couples living together, 8.9% had a female householder with no husband present, and 19.6% were non-families. 19.6% of all households were made up of individuals, and 12.5% had someone living alone who was 65 years of age or older. The average household size was 2.79 and the average family size was 3.16.

In the township the population was spread out, with 22.3% under the age of 18, 3.9% from 18 to 24, 25.7% from 25 to 44, 20.7% from 45 to 64, and 27.4% who were 65 years of age or older. The median age was 43 years. For every 100 females, there were 61.3 males. For every 100 females age 18 and over, there were 65.5 males.

The median income for a household in the township was $42,500, and the median income for a family was $44,583. Males had a median income of $30,625 versus $17,273 for females. The per capita income for the township was $15,327. About 4.7% of families and 6.3% of the population were below the poverty line, including 22.2% of those under the age of eighteen and none of those sixty five or over.
