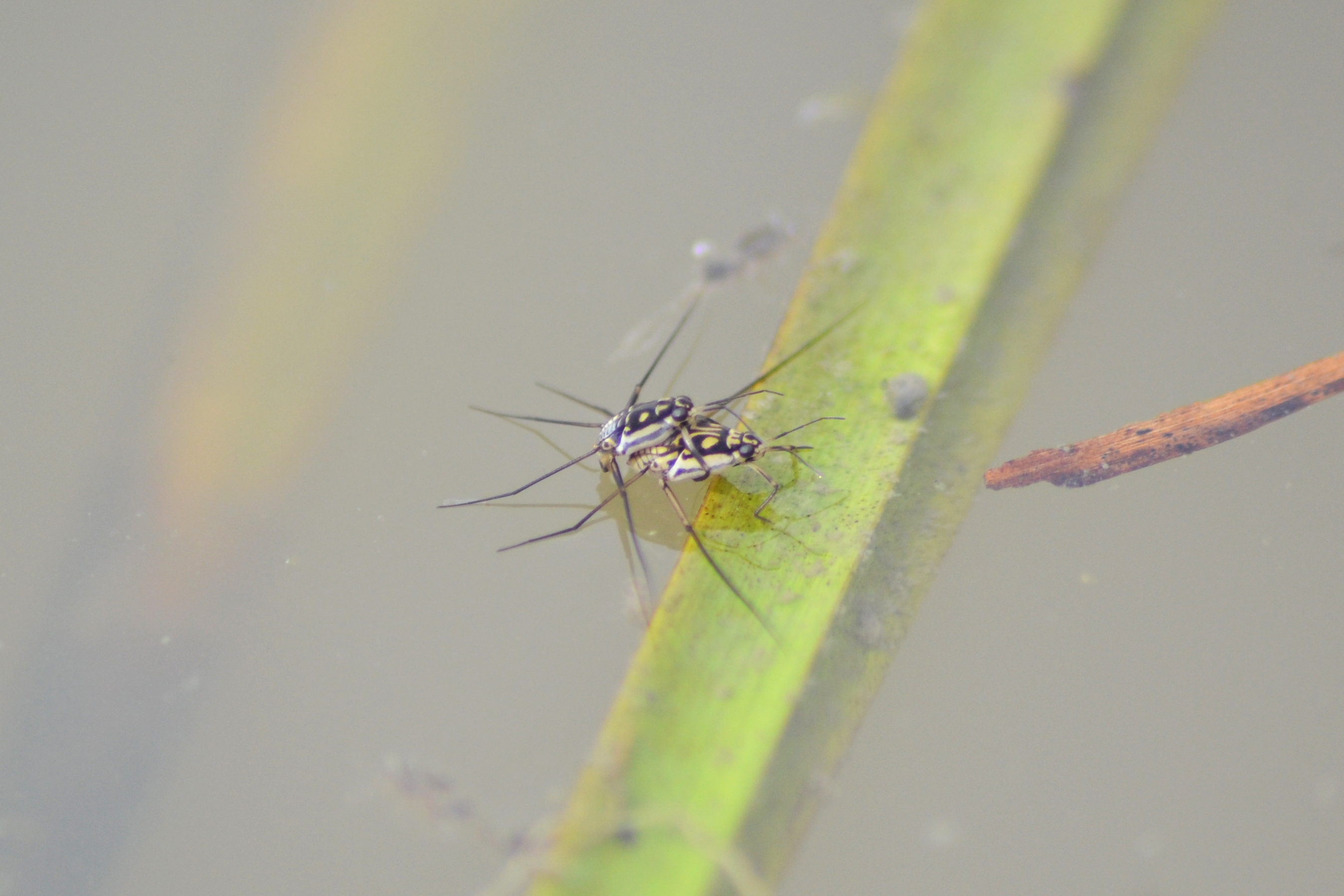
- Trepobates subnitidus

Scientific classification
- Domain: Eukaryota
- Kingdom: Animalia
- Phylum: Arthropoda
- Class: Insecta
- Order: Hemiptera
- Suborder: Heteroptera
- Family: Gerridae
- Subfamily: Trepobatinae
- Genus: Trepobates; Uhler, 1883

Synonyms
- Kallistometra Kirkaldy, 1899

= Trepobates =

Genus of true bugs

Trepobates is a genus of water striders in the family Gerridae. There are 12 described species in Trepobates.

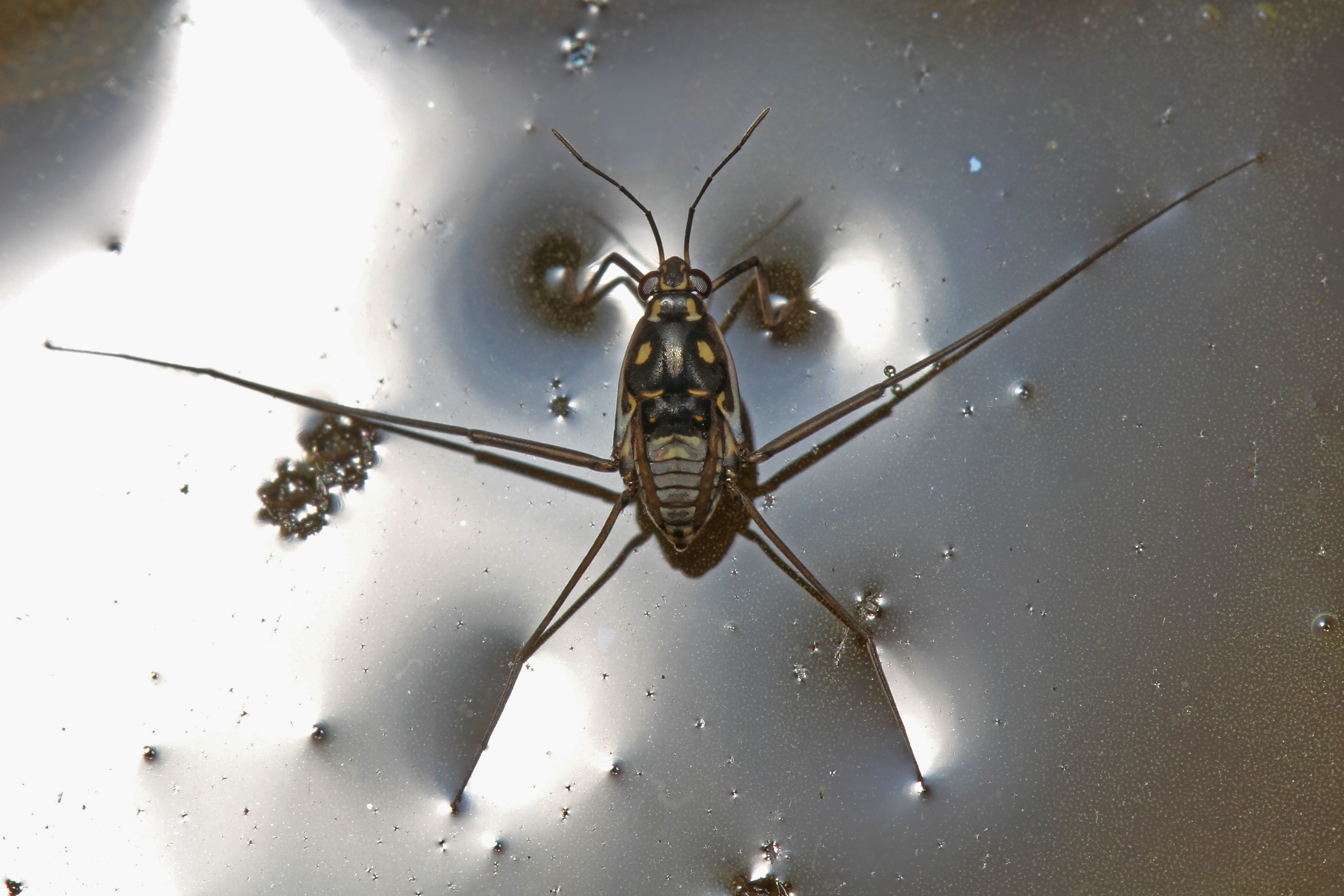
Trepobates subnitidus

== Species ==
These 12 species belong to the genus Trepobates:

- Trepobates becki Drake & Harris, 1932
- Trepobates carri Kittle, 1982
- Trepobates floridensis Drake & Harris, 1928
- Trepobates inermis Esaki, 1926
- Trepobates knighti Drake & Harris, 1928
- Trepobates panamensis Drake & Hottes, 1952
- Trepobates pictus (Herrich-Schaeffer, 1847)
- Trepobates polhemi Kittle, 1982
- Trepobates subnitidus Esaki, 1926
- Trepobates taylori (Kirkaldy, 1899)
- Trepobates trepidus Drake & Harris, 1928
- Trepobates vazquezae Drake & Hottes, 1951
