= Shephards =

Former department store chain

Shephards of Gateshead was a small department store chain in the North East of England with its flagship store being located in Gateshead.

== History ==
Emerson Shephard had originally opened a shop on Swinburn Street in Gateshead but in 1908 moved to the Ellison Street. The store initially sold shoes and boots but quickly grew to become a department store.

By 1924, the business had grown, with ten branches across the North East. The branch in North Shields had been the department store of George Swann who had overstretched himself while building his new store and Shephards took over the business.

In 1934, the Ellison Street store in Gateshead was given a makeover which included three new floors and expansion to 30 departments. The store was undamaged during the Second World War but, in 1946, it was burnt to the ground.

While the store was being rebuilt, Shephards moved to Kent House, the former Snowballs department store. In 1949, the new store was opened and included the famous Panorama Restaurant.

During the 1970s, Shephards ran an advertisement on local TV with the catchy jingle:

Shephards of Gateshead, the biggest and the best store
Shephards of Gateshead have what you're looking for
There's so much to see, and the car park is free
Come shopping at Shephards for the whole family

The 1970s were financially damaging and by 1980 the Shephards business had closed. The Gateshead store was purchased by Tesco which created Tesco Shopping City, where store space was rented to other retailers. This was not a successful venture, especially after the opening of the Metrocentre in 1986, and subsequently closed. The site is now the Trinity Square shopping and leisure complex.
