= Farrandsville Iron Furnace =

- U.S. National Register of Historic Places
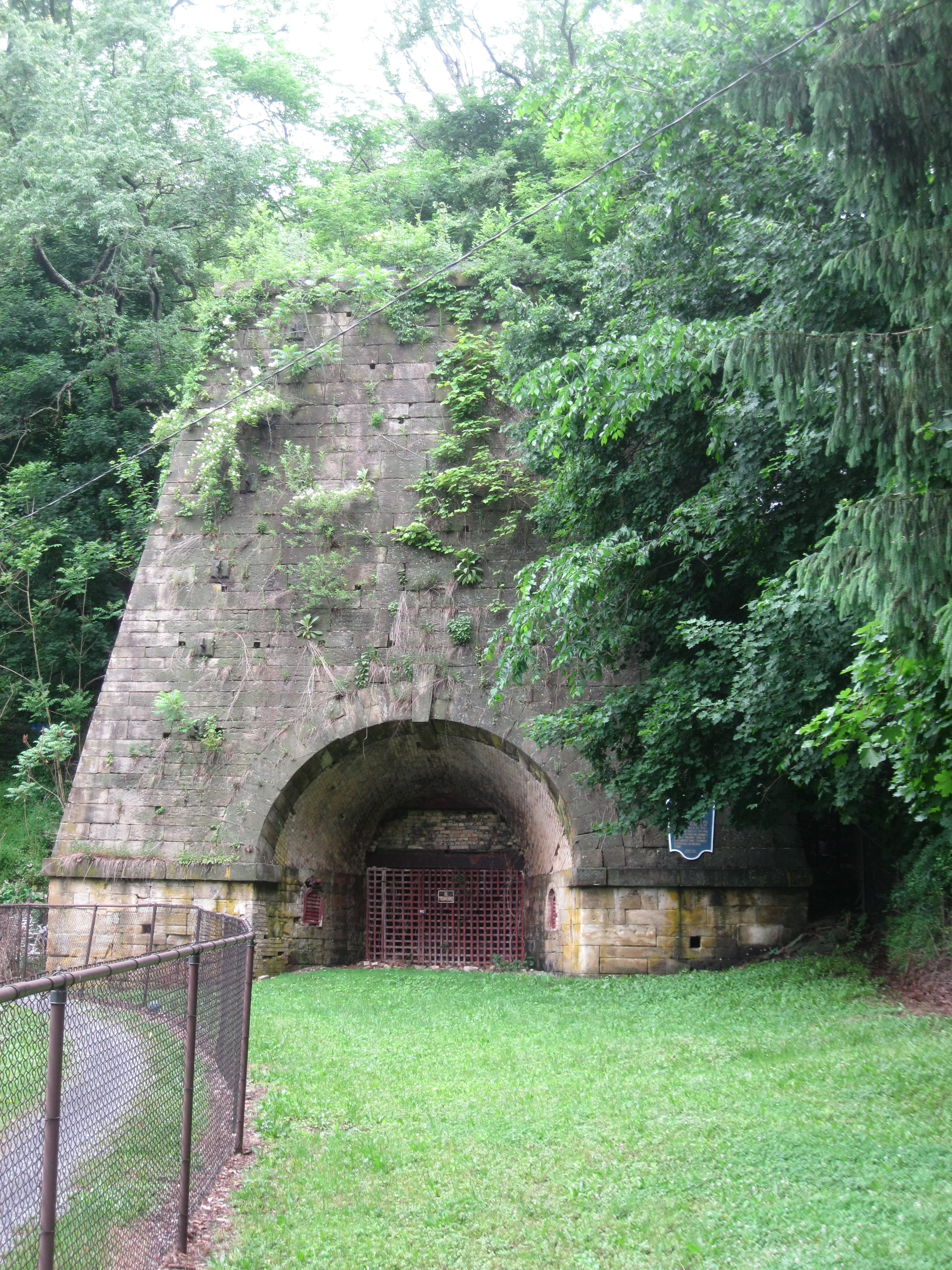
- The Farrandsville Furnace in August 2012

- Location within Pennsylvania Location within the United States
- Location: Jct. of Graham and Old Carrier Rds., Farrandsville, Colebrook Township, Pennsylvania
- Coordinates: 41°10′29″N 77°30′52″W
- Area: 0.1 acres (0.040 ha)
- Built: 1836
- Architectural style: Iron furnace
- MPS: Iron and Steel Resources of Pennsylvania MPS
- NRHP reference No.: 91001137
- Added to NRHP: September 6, 1991

Farrandsville Iron Furnace, also known as Lycoming Coal Co., is a historic iron furnace located at Colebrook Township in Clinton County, Pennsylvania about 6 miles northwest of Lock Haven. It was built between 1836 and 1837, and measures 43 feet square by 54 feet high. It is a rare example of an early attempt to adopt coke as a blast furnace fuel.

It was listed on the National Register of Historic Places in 1991.

== History ==
Capitalists from Boston financed the furnace's construction starting in 1836. John Thomas likely supervised construction and John P. Salmon was the master mason. It was equipped with Scottish machinery installed by Scot James Ralston, and produced fifty tons of pig iron per week. Bituminous coal was mined at nearby Minersville and transported by inclined plane. Transportation of iron ore was from over 100 miles away via canal, but this proved difficult, as did transportation of flux from the Nittany Valley.

The financial Panic of 1837 forced the furnace to close in 1838. A brick furnace was then built on the same property and was later owned by Harbison-Walker Refractories Company who deeded it to the Clinton County Historical Society in 1951.
