= Fire brick =

Building material

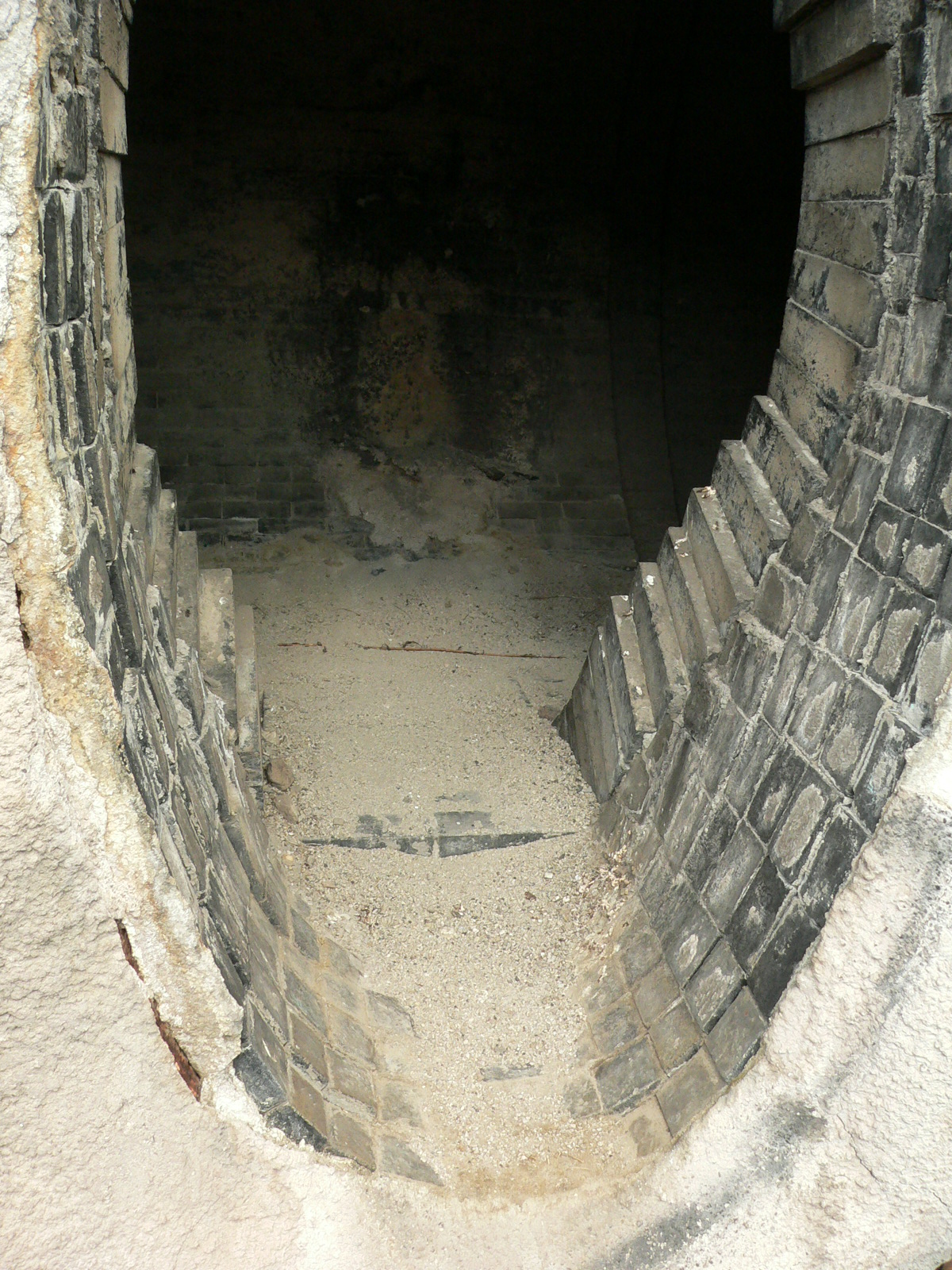
Refractory bricks in a torpedo car used for hauling molten iron

A fire brick, firebrick, fireclay brick, or refractory brick is a block of ceramic material used in lining furnaces, kilns, fireboxes, and fireplaces. Made of primarily oxide materials like silica and alumina in varying ratios, these insulating materials are able to withstand extremely high temperatures, and have a low thermal conductivity for greater energy efficiency. Refractory bricks generally range from 25-45% alumina, and ~60% silica, with additional magnesium, calcium, potassium oxides.

Usually dense fire bricks are used in applications with extreme mechanical, chemical, or thermal stresses, such as the inside of a wood-fired kiln or a furnace, which is subject to abrasion from wood, fluxing from ash or slag, and high temperatures. In other, less harsh situations, such as in an electric or natural gas-fired kiln, more porous bricks, commonly known as "kiln bricks", are a better choice. They are weaker, but they are much lighter and easier to form and insulate far better than dense bricks. In any case, firebricks should not spall, and their strength should hold up well during rapid temperature changes.

== Manufacturing ==
There are three main manufacturing methods for firebrick: firing, cementing and geopolymerization. In the first method, clay is fired in the kiln until it is partly vitrified. For special purposes, the brick may also be glazed. Firing is the most conventional process, with easy execution using traditional equipment. However, it is an energy intensive process, consuming a significant amount of energy - on the scale of 2.0 kWh per brick. Firing also releases around 0.41 kg of CO_{2} from the decomposition of carbonate materials and combustion of fuel.

To cement, refractory brick is combined with refractory cement. Portland cement is not able to withstand high temperatures and is therefore not recommended. High-temperature refractory cements include furnace cements or high-heat mortar. These mixtures are applied to the brick surfaces and pressed together, and allowed to cure with time - taking anywhere from days to weeks.

A technique with the potential to replace firing and cementing is geopolymerization. Firing and cementing both require huge amounts of energy and release large amounts of greenhouse gases, thus motivating research into additional methods of production. Efforts to incorporate up to 30 wt% of waste materials into clay ceramics have been shown. Clay ceramics with 17 wt% additives displayed the highest bending strength of 30 MPa. Although these waste materials are inert, they could be responsible for structural defects that change the material properties and therefore applications of these bricks.

There are two standard sizes of fire brick: 229 mm × 114 mm × 76 mm (9 in × 4 1/2 in × 3 in) and 229 mm × 114 mm × 64 mm (9 in × 4 1/2 in × 2 1/2 in). Also available are firebrick "splits" which are half the thickness and are often used to line wood stoves and fireplace inserts. The dimensions of a split are usually 229 mm × 114 mm × 32 mm (9 in × 4 1/2 in × 1 1/4 in). Fire brick was first invented in 1822 by William Weston Young in the Neath Valley of Wales.

== High temperature applications ==
The silica fire bricks that line steel-making furnaces are used at temperatures up to 1,649 °C (3,000 °F), which would melt many other types of ceramic, and in fact part of the silica firebrick liquefies. High-temperature Reusable Surface Insulation (HRSI), a material with the same composition, was used in the insulating tiles of the Space Shuttle.

Non-ferrous metallurgical processes use basic refractory bricks because the slags used in these processes readily dissolve the "acidic" silica bricks. The most common basic refractory bricks used in smelting non-ferrous metal concentrates are "chrome-magnesite" or "magnesite-chrome" bricks (depending on the relative ratios of magnesite and chromite ores used in their manufacture).

== Lower temperature applications ==
A range of other materials find use as firebricks for lower temperature applications. Magnesium oxide is often used as a lining for furnaces. Silica bricks are the most common type of bricks used for the inner lining of furnaces and incinerators. As the inner lining is usually of sacrificial nature, fire bricks of higher alumina content may be employed to lengthen the duration between re-linings. Very often cracks can be seen in this sacrificial inner lining shortly after being put into operation. They revealed more expansion joints should have been put in the first place, but these now become expansion joints themselves and are of no concern as long as structural integrity is not affected. Silicon carbide, with high abrasive strength, is a popular material for hearths of incinerators and cremators. Common red clay brick may be used for chimneys and wood-fired ovens.

== Material properties ==
The linear shrinkage of firebrick under compression was found to be around 12.8%. This number can be decreased to below 8% with the addition of 25wt% coal ash. This is due to the high porosity of pure refractory bricks, around 31%, which compromise some of its structural integrity. When even 5wt% of coal ash is added, the porosity decreases to 24%, and can withstand more compressive load. Bulk density of firebrick is between 1.88-2.05 g/cm^3, which is the approximate standard recommendation for high-temperature applications. This high-density is preferred in order to offer resistance in challenging operating environments. The standard for cold crushing strength is a minimum of 12,000 kN/m^2 for refractory materials.

== Potential use to store energy ==
Firebricks, with their ability to withstand high temperatures and store heat, offer a promising solution for storing energy. These refractory bricks can be used to store industrial process heat, leveraging excess renewable electricity to create a low-cost, continuous heat source for industry. Due to their construction from common materials, firebrick storage systems are much more cost-effective than battery systems for thermal energy storage. Research across 149 countries indicates that using firebricks for heat storage can significantly reduce the need for electricity generation, battery storage, hydrogen production, and low-temperature heat storage. This approach could lower overall energy costs by about 1.8%, making firebricks a valuable tool in reducing the costs of transitioning to 100% clean, renewable energy.

== See also ==
- Harbison-Walker Refractories Company
- Equivalent VIII
- Niles Firebrick
