= Harbison-Walker Refractories Company =

- U.S. National Register of Historic Places
- U.S. Historic district
- U.S. Historic district – Contributing property
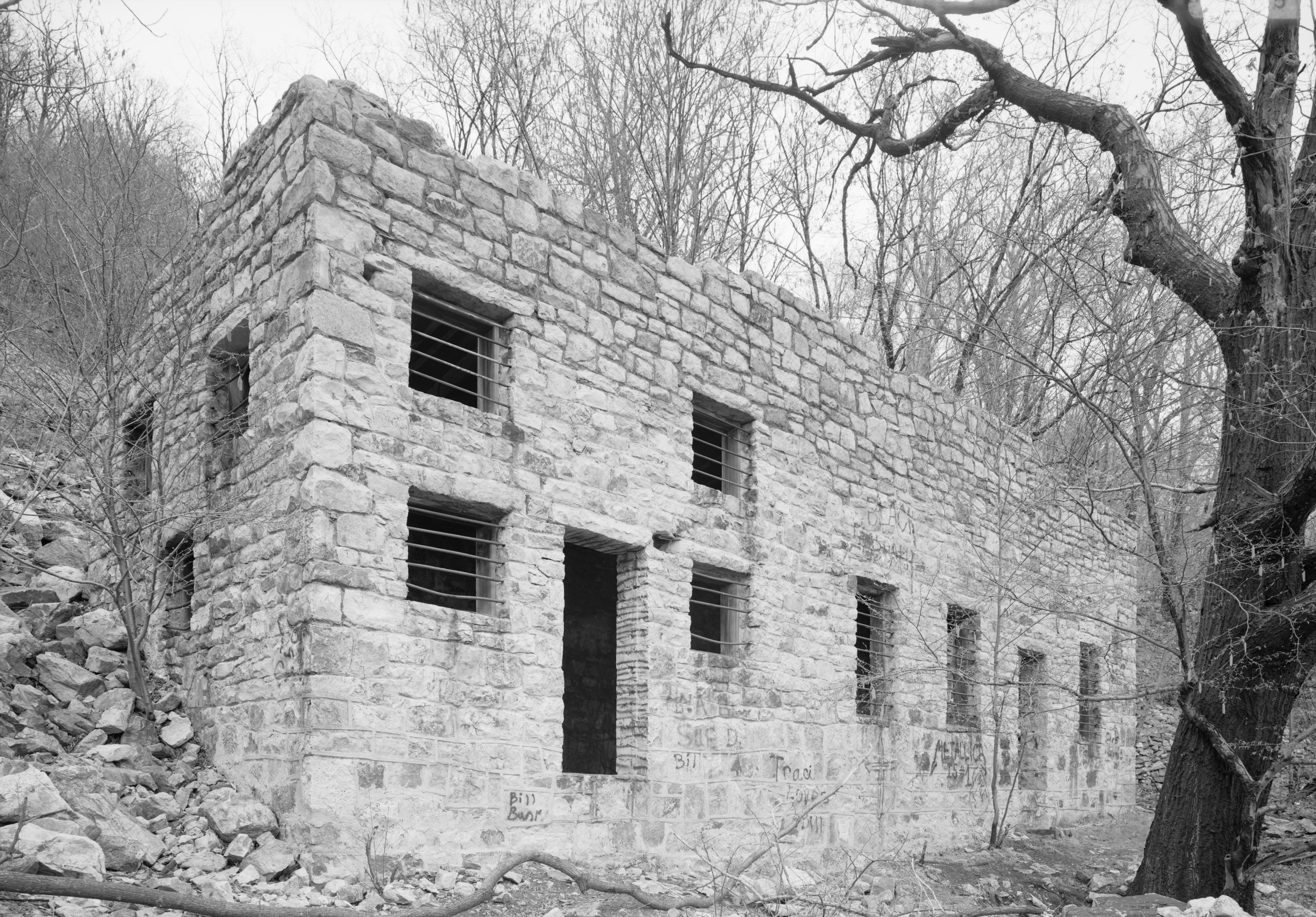
- Harbison-Walker engine repair house, May 1989

- Location within Pennsylvania Location within the United States
- Location: W. Shirley St., Mount Union, Pennsylvania
- Coordinates: 40°23′10″N 77°53′23″W
- Area: 21 acres (8.5 ha)
- Built: 1899, 1905
- MPS: Industrial Resources of Huntingdon County, 1780--1939 MPS
- NRHP reference No.: 90000392
- Added to NRHP: March 20, 1990

The Harbison-Walker Refractories Company is a national historic district and historic refractory brick manufacturing complex which is located in Mount Union in Huntingdon County, Pennsylvania. It originated as the Star Firebrick Company on March 7, 1865, with Articles of Association by a group of Pittsburgh and Allegheny residents.

It was listed on the National Register of Historic Places in 1990. It is located in the Mount Union Historic District, established in 1994.

== History ==
On January 30, 1875, Hay Walker Sr. and Samuel P. Harbison entered Articles of Agreement to purchase the interests in Star Fire Brick Company and formed the Harbison and Walker Company. Then on July 30, 1894, Harbison & Walker was incorporated under the laws of the Commonwealth of Pennsylvania, finally being chartered as Harbison-Walker Refractories Company by the Commonwealth of Pennsylvania on June 30, 1902. Ultimately this company was merged into Dresser Industries in 1967.

The company was part of the Fortune 500 from 1955 until 1967.

In 2015, a successor company in Pittsburgh adopted the name HarbisonWalker International.

A national historic district and historic refractory brick manufacturing complex which is located in Mount Union in Huntingdon County, Pennsylvania, the Harbison-Walker Refractories Company property consists of fourteen contributing buildings and twenty-seven contributing structures, which were built in two sections; the No. 2 works date to 1899 and the No. 1 works date to 1905. Principal buildings and structures include brick kilns; mixing, molding, and drying facilities; storage and shipping sheds; a pattern making building; and crushing and screening facilities.
