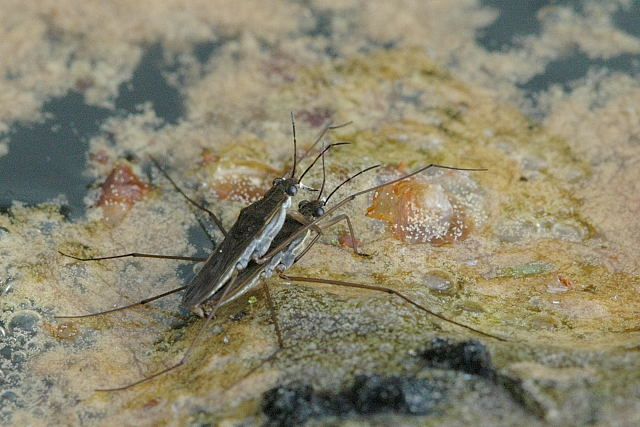
- A pair of common water striders (Gerris lacustris) copulating

Scientific classification
- Kingdom: Animalia
- Phylum: Arthropoda
- Clade: Pancrustacea
- Class: Insecta
- Order: Hemiptera
- Suborder: Heteroptera
- Family: Gerridae
- Subfamily: Gerrinae
- Genus: Gerris; Fabricius, 1794

Species
- See text

= Gerris =

Genus of true bugs

Gerris is an insect genus in the family Gerridae (water striders).

== Species ==
The genus Gerris contains 44 species in 3 subgenera:

=== Subgenus Gerris ===
- Gerris alacris Hussey, 1921
- Gerris angulatus Lundblad, 1934
- Gerris argentatus Schummel, 1832
- Gerris argenticollis Parshley, 1916
- Gerris babai Miyamoto, 1958
- Gerris brasili Poisson, 1941
- Gerris buenoi Kirkaldy, 1911
- Gerris caucasicus Kanyukova, 1982
- Gerris comatus Drake and Hottes, 1925
- Gerris costae (Herrich-Schäffer, 1850)
- Gerris curvus Tran & J.T. Polhemus, 2012
- Gerris firmus Drake and Harris, 1938
- Gerris gibbifer Schummel, 1832
- Gerris gillettei Lethierry and Severin, 1896
- Gerris gobanus Poisson, 1940
- Gerris incognitus Drake and Hottes, 1925
- Gerris incurvatus Drake and Hottes, 1925
- Gerris insperatus Drake and Hottes, 1925
- Gerris kabaishanus Linnavuori, 1998
- Gerris lacustris (Linnaeus, 1758)
- Gerris latiabdominis Miyamoto, 1958
- Gerris lobatus Andersen and Chen, 1993
- Gerris maculatus Tamanini, 1946
- Gerris marginatus Say, 1832
- Gerris nepalensis Distant, 1910
- Gerris odontogaster (Zetterstedt, 1828)
- Gerris pingreensis Drake and Hottes, 1925
- Gerris sphagnetorum Gaunitz, 1947
- Gerris swakopensis (Stal, 1858)
- Gerris thoracicus Schummel, 1832
- Gerris xizangensis Zhang, Leng, and Ye, 2026
- Gerris zuqualanus Poisson, 1940

=== Subgenus Gerriselloides ===
- Gerris asper (Fieber, 1860)
- Gerris brachynotus Horváth, 1907
- Gerris kiritshenkoi Kanyukova, 1979
- Gerris lateralis Schummel, 1832

=== Subgenus Macrogerris ===
- Gerris cui Esaki, 1925
- Gerris gracilicornis Horváth, 1879
- Gerris insularis Motschulsky, 1866
- Gerris issikii Miyamoto, 1961
- Gerris lundbladi Andersen and Chen, 1993
- Gerris tigrinus Brown, 1949
- Gerris yezoensis Miyamoto, 1958

== Mating system ==
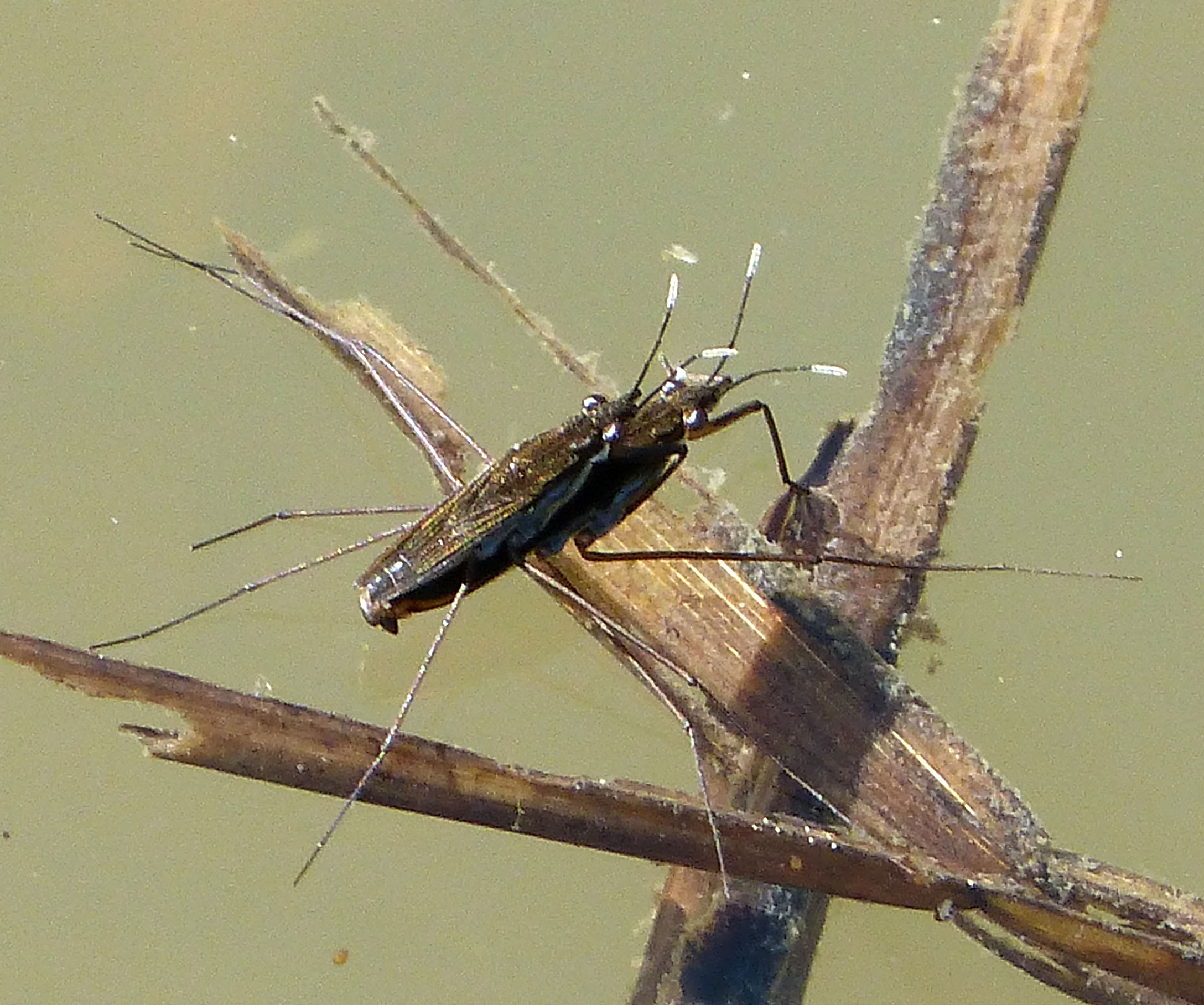
Male grappling on top of the female in an attempt to force copulation

Species of genus Gerris demonstrate a high degree of female control over most aspects of mating and there is significant evidence that supports antagonistic coevolution, and the convenience polyandry hypothesis of multiple matings. There is evidence to suggest that the post-copulatory guarding exhibited by Gerris buenoi - and other species of Gerris - is a form of a direct (material) benefit that females take advantage of to reduce superfluous matings.

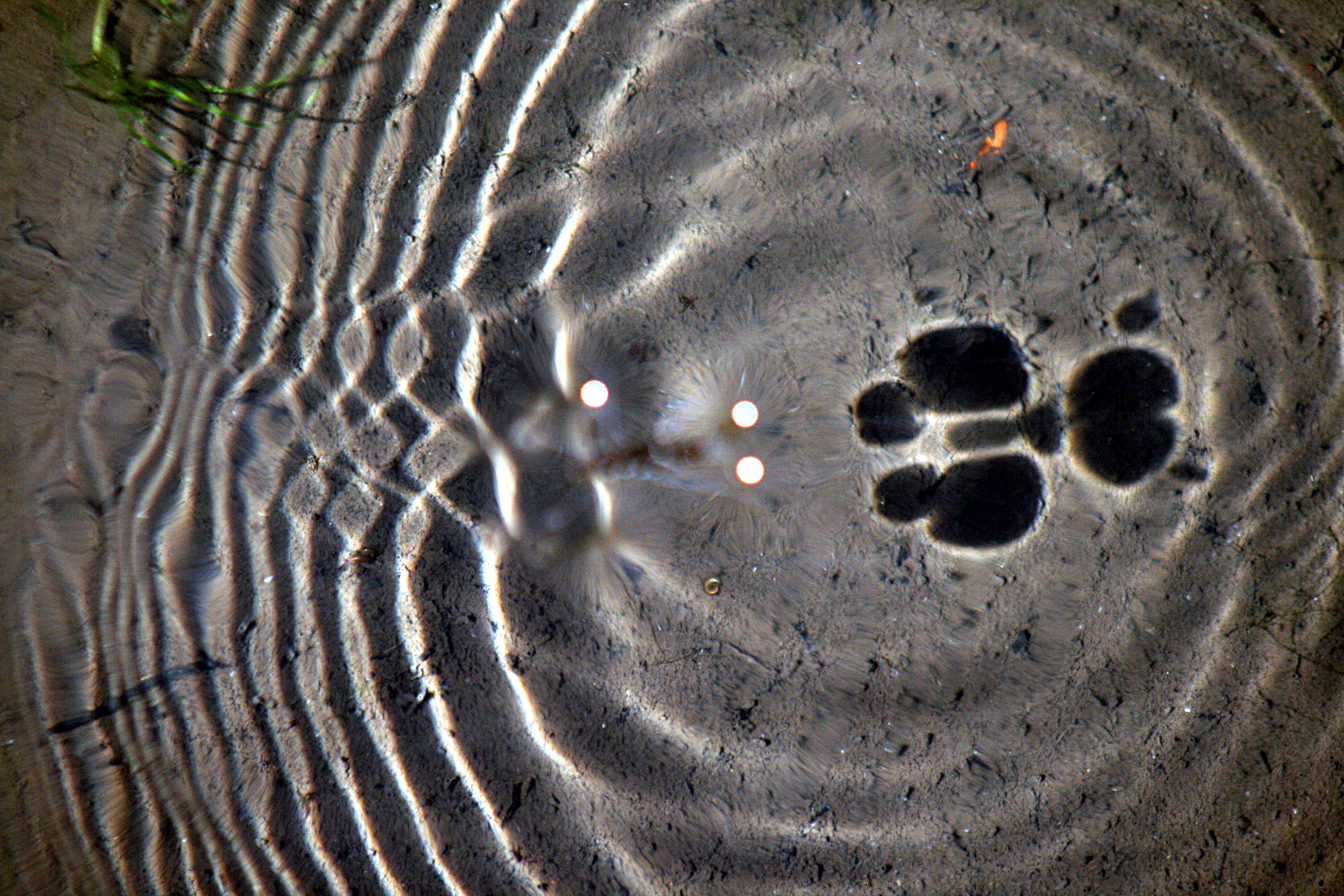
"Moving of mating Water Striders (Gerris argentatus), weigh about 0.00002 lb created surface waves (Ripples) in a pond. The striders are out of focus (on purpose), but you could see their shadows, the hairs at their legs and the sun reflected from their footprints" - Brocken Inaglory. The ripples attract predators.

Male persistence is often detrimental to female fitness as male species of Gerris harass females. This is believed to be the result of males having a lower number of available mates and therefore, have a reduced fitness. Females are at risk of predation during mating attempts as males mount the female in an attempt to mate and tap their legs on the surface of the water to attract predators. Females respond in turn, creating a pre-copulatory struggle in which they try to perform backwards somersault-like movements to break free of the male grapple. If unsuccessful, female species of Gerris will resort to mating with the male as the cost of rejecting the male advances (death by predation) outweighs the cost of mating out of convenience.

An example of genitalia shielding and the courting that males do instead of the usual forced copulation attempts.

As a result of the tactics employed by both species there is evidence of rapid evolution between the sexes in a persistence-resistance form of sexual conflict. The sexes of species of genus Gerris compete between each other in an "arms race" behaviour where males and females have varying traits that serve to increase their own fitness over the other. Males evolved to harass females by chasing and lunging in an attempt to grapple the female for copulation, and females evolved mechanisms such as genital shielding, evasive maneuvers, and attempting to fight even when grappled. However, evading and fighting are quite costly for females and will give in if the costs of resistance outweigh the cost of mating. Genital shielding can best be seen in G. gracilicornis and a male will have a hard time at inserting his genitalia unless the female protrudes her genitalia out. Males have evolved to overcome this mechanism by attempting an intimate courtship instead of forceful mating, as well as a more hostile approach: attracting predators to force mating with females. The rationale behind attracting predators to force mating is due to how copulation occurs: a male will attempt to mount a female on the surface water; it is the female that is at most risk from insect-eating fish and water dwelling predators.

After copulation, males continue to rest on top of females for some period of time - this is what is known as guarding duration. It can be hypothesized that when superfluous matings are plenty, females will extend this guarding duration by allowing the male to rest upon her for some time which in turn prevents harassment from other males. This also incurs costs for the female as they must exert energetic costs to compensate for the passive male on her back, and that this might not be an effective tactic for females in the long run.

Water striders, and more specifically those that fall under the genus Gerris are a model organism for studying sexual conflict as they have clear costs associated with their actions. They have great use as a control group when comparing to other organisms where it is more unclear as what is occurring.

== Former species ==
- Gerris ampla reclassified as Aquarius amplus (Drake and Harris, 1938)
- Gerris canaliculatus reclassified as Limnoporus canaliculatus (Say, 1832)
- Gerris conformis reclassified as Aquarius conformis (Uhler, 1878)
- Gerris dissortis reclassified as Limnoporus dissortis (Drake and Harris, 1930)
- Gerris mantis reclassified as Emesa mantis (Fabricius, 1794)
- Gerris najas reclassified as Aquarius najas (De Geer, 1773)
- Gerris nebularis reclassified as Aquarius nebularis (Drake and Hottes, 1925)
- Gerris nyctalis reclassified as Aquarius nyctalis (Drake and Hottes, 1925) (now synonymized with A. remigis)
- Gerris remigis reclassified as Aquarius remigis (Say, 1832)
- Gerris rufoscutellatus reclassified as Limnoporus rufoscutellatus (Latreille, 1807)
