= Polyandry in animals =

Class of mating system in non-human species

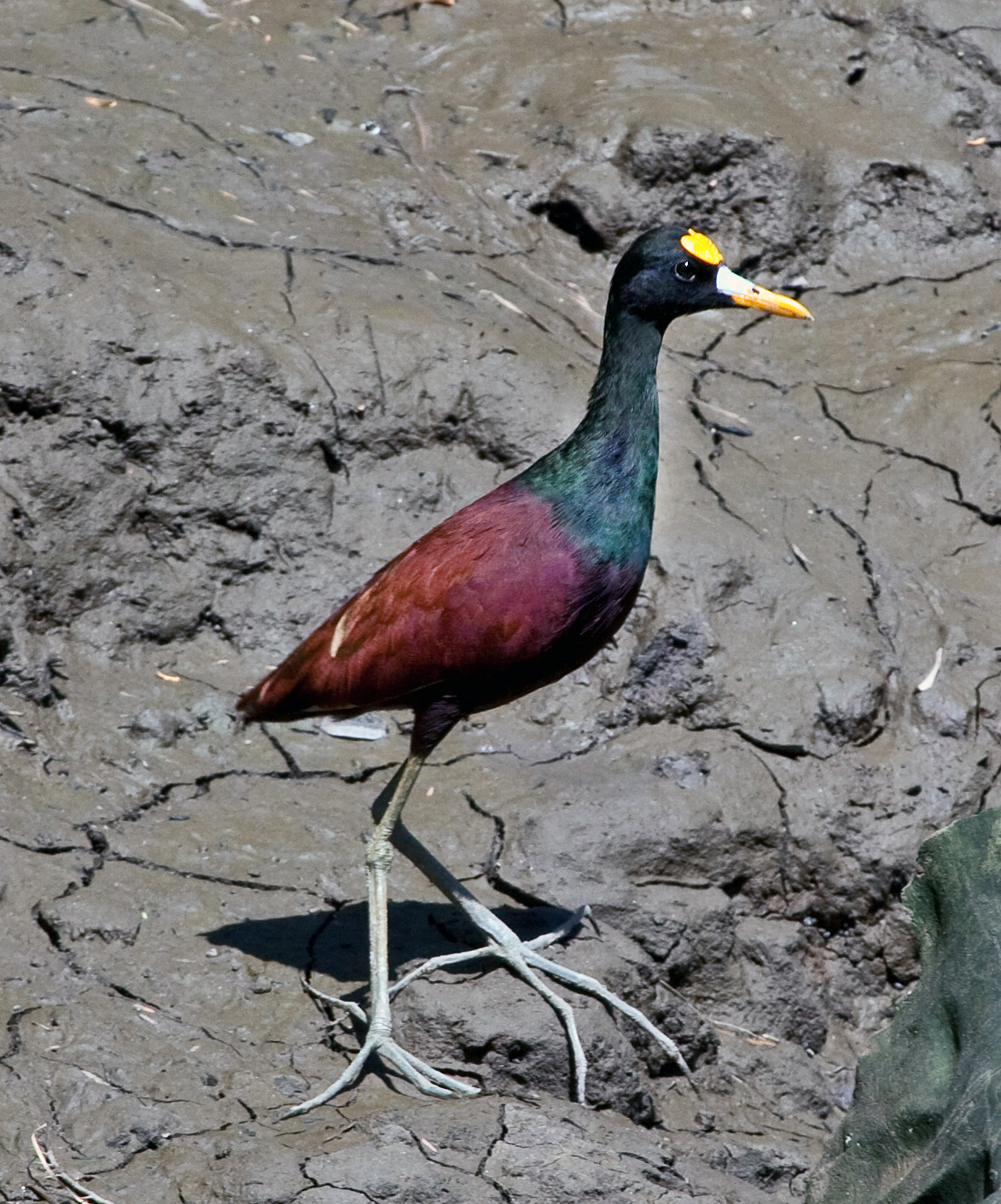
Jacana spinosa – Palo Verde National Park, Costa Rica

In behavioral ecology, polyandry is a class of mating system where one female mates with several males in a breeding season. Polyandry is often compared to the polygyny system based on the cost and benefits incurred by members of each sex. Polygyny is where one male mates with several females in a breeding season (e.g., lions, deer, some primates, and many systems where there is an alpha male). A common example of polyandrous mating can be found in the field cricket (Gryllus bimaculatus) of the insect order Orthoptera (containing crickets, grasshoppers, and groundhoppers). Polyandrous behavior is also prominent in many other insect species, including honeybees, the red flour beetle, the adzuki bean weevil, and the species of spider Stegodyphus lineatus. Polyandry also occurs in some mammals including primates such as marmosets and the marsupial genera Antechinus and bandicoots, and in around 1% of all bird species, such as jacanas and dunnocks, and in fish such as pipefish.

== Predictors of polyandry ==
It is theorized that polyandry is more prevalent in organisms where incompatibility is more costly, and where this incompatibility is more likely. The former is especially true in viviparous organisms. Where the cost of having a low-quality father is significant, however, an organism is less likely to be polyandrous.

== Benefits and costs of mating for females ==
The adaptive significance of polyandry in animals is controversial. Polyandry has direct benefits for females allowing fertilization assurance, provision of resources, and parental care for their offspring. House mice (Mus musculus musculus) have shown indirect, genetic benefits, where females have increased offspring survival through multiple mating, showing that practicing polyandry mating results in an increase in offspring viability. In a meta analysis, including 10 different orders of insects, polyandry increased the production of eggs by females specifically in Lepidopterans and Orthopterans. Indirect benefits of mating for females can be gained through sperm competition to attain "good genes" (Good-sperm hypothesis), cryptic female choice, increased genetic quality, and genetic diversity. Females spiders (Pisaura mirabilis) store more sperm from gift-giving males suggesting that sperm storage is under female control through cryptic sperm choice. The increase in sperm storage from the gift giving males might allow females to produce "sexy sons" that also give gifts and increase the fitness of offspring. Sperm storage and fertilization success increased with copulation duration, suggesting an advantage in sperm competition. Polyandry also works as evolutionary bet-hedging to avoid extinction of female lineage due to male infertility or mating failure (bet-hedging polyandry hypothesis).

Many reptile species also demonstrate polyandry, especially among members of the tortoise family (Testudinidae). Through polyandry and long-term sperm storage, recent studies have found evidence for the ability of female tortoises to produce clutches of eggs that demonstrate multiple paternity. Predictably, these hatchlings showed an increase in genetic variability compared to those sired by a single male. Potential for multiple paternity within a clutch is primarily a result of sperm storage across reproductive cycles, since studies have confirmed the presence of multiple males' sperm in the female tortoise reproductive tract simultaneously. As a result of clutches with greater variation in paternal genes and increased sperm competition, females can maximize both the genetic quality and number of offspring. Multiple paternities within a single clutch is therefore considered an effective strategy to increase the reproductive success and fitness of female tortoises.

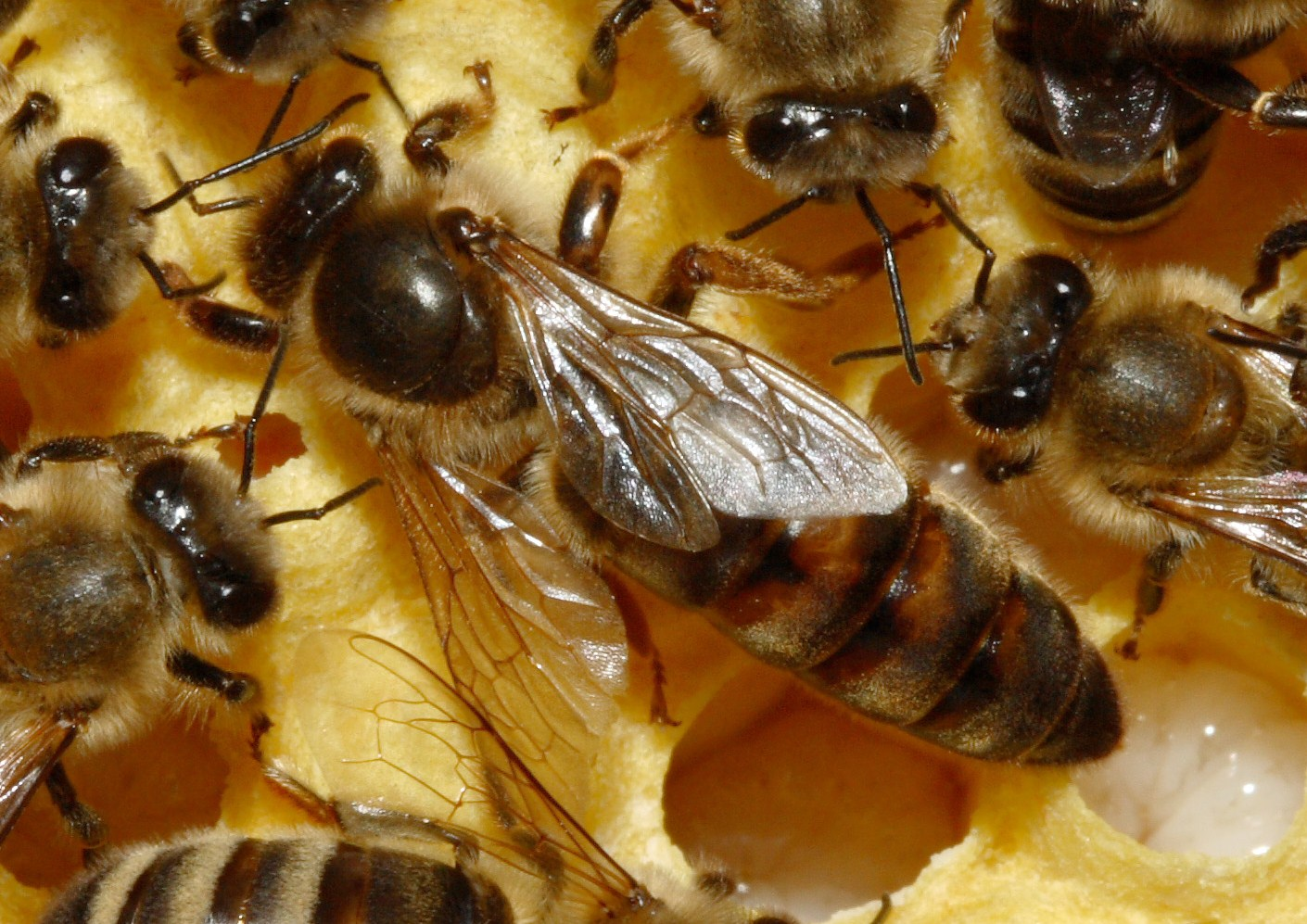
The queen bee is usually the only female bee within a hive reproducing with drones, which often come from various hives. She mothers most or all offspring within a given hive.

Acorn woodpeckers provide substantial information on breeding systems because they practice monogamy, polyandry, and polygyny. In polyandry the presence of more male breeders in acorn woodpeckers has shown that females reproduce the optimal clutch size and that with paternity sharing between males it is behaviorally more stable increasing male and female fitness. As opposed to polygyny, where it has been observed that polygynous females that lay a large number of eggs exceeding the optimal clutch size reduces the fitness of the group. Polygynous trios compared to polyandrous trios showed that having more eggs lowered the group fitness. Chao (1997) studies using acorn woodpeckers suggest that other mating systems are practiced at a lower rate when compared to polyandry because it is polyandry that can maximize the fitness of males and females when obtaining optimal clutch size. In polyandrous mating, optimal clutch size is obtained because there is only one female and it becomes more stable when all members remain together.

Multiple mating is also seen in wattled jacanas where females have a group of males close by for mating. Copulations are easily seen in jacanas, facilitating the observation of females copulating continuously with various males. The continuous copulations and the close proximity to mates have allowed the females to fly in within minutes leading to the expected sperm mixing and allowing the most viable sperm to fertilize most of the clutch or to increase genetic diversity for benefits in disease resistance. Snow and Andrade (2005) concluded that the redback spider (Latrodectus hasselti) increases their ability to manipulate the paternity of their offspring by using the spermathecae to store multiple sperms. Additionally, a study on leaf-cutting ants (Acromyrmex echinatior) supported the hypothesis that sperm mixing indeed occurs in polyandrous social insects. It was further found that the eggs in the queen ants showed to be completely mixed and used randomly during egg laying.

According to Gordon G. Gallup, as a form of adapting to multiple mating in females, human penile shape is indicative of an evolutionary history of polyandry. Male humans evolved to have a wedge- or spoon-shaped glans and to perform repeated thrusting motions during copulation in order to draw foreign semen back away from the cervix and thus to compete with sperm of other males.

Polyandry may also impose costs on females, exposing them to diseases, increased predation risk, time and energy costs, and even physical harm due to sexual harassment. Polyandrous females encounter sexual harassment when courted by males resulting to be costly to females. In order to reduce the costs to the females, females will take part in polyandry. For example, in the bee species Anthidium maculosum, like in many other species, the high cost of resisting mating may exceed the cost of accepting numerous males in a breeding if copulating takes a short time, and therefore females in some species are inclined to being polyandrous. In the polyandrous system, sexual coercion has been observed to be one of the major reasons for why females begin to mate with multiple males to outweigh the cost under different circumstances. The sexual conflict hypothesis suggest that polyandry can occur due to sexual coercion preventing females from obtaining any benefits. Sexual coercion has been seen in three different forms: forced copulation, sexual harassment, and intimidation. Forced copulation is seen in those males that cannot gain access to females for mating. As a result of the lack of access to mates, males are more likely to engage in sexually aggressive behaviors that could result in physical harm and death for females, as has been observed in elephant seals and ducks. Intimidation was seen in social primates, who coerce females into mating, therefore, pushing them to mate with their own aggressor. Males use intimidation as a method of punishment in females that do not mate with them.

Sexual coercion has many benefits to males allowing them to mate, but their strategies pose high cost for females. This has been observed in vertebrates like green turtles. The green turtles is an example of a species that does not receive any possible benefit from polyandry and only uses it to reduce the cost of mating. As for house mice, multiple male mating was observed even when females had the opportunity to select their mate without sexual coercion, showing that it was due to female choice. In the fly Dryomyza anilis, females favor matings with quick oviposition. D. anilis females can store sperm for at least two egg batches without their fertilization rate decreasing. Therefore, mating before each oviposition is not necessary. There is no significant overall benefit for females in multiple matings; large females are at an advantage due to their ability to resist unnecessary matings.

As a result of multiple male mating, multiple paternities were observed in species as a result of convenience polyandry. Convenience Polyandry Hypothesis is the assumption that there is a greater cost for females when, refusing male mating attempts than in choice mating. It is the situation in which females adjust their mating rate to balance the costs of male harassment. It has been suggested that convenience polyandry would increase when females are weaker than males, decreasing the costs of sexual aggression. Convenience polyandry is seen in several arthropod species, like water striders (Gerris buenoi).

== Paternity sharing ==
Males that compete for more mating opportunities are the ones that have shown less cooperation in breeding. However, there are other males that in order to gain access to females and mating opportunities practice parental care. Such parental care is mostly seen in polyandrous mating systems; but they must go through the cost of sharing paternity and parental care. This has been observed in avians like acorn woodpeckers (Melanerpes formicivorus), and fishes as the cichlid fish (Julidochromis transcriptus). Observations that show male relatedness suggest the importance for male social relationships in taking care of offspring. These social relationships in males are seen in primates, Geoffroy's tamarins, Saguinus geoffroyi. High proportions of related males at the half sibling or higher were found.

As for frog species, rhacaphorid frog (Kurixalus eiffingeri), is one of the few that is polyandrous and exhibits parental care of eggs. The male frogs sit on the egg clutches, maintaining contact with the eggs. Parental care and males genetic contribution were found significantly correlated meaning that male frogs with a higher paternity attended their eggs far more significantly than those of partial paternity for the clutch. Females that mate with more than one male obtain the aid of both and as a result of all three parents providing food and care to the offspring there is an increase in the survival of their young. The amount of help is determined based on paternity share. (Mating Systems, p 275)

In polyandrous mating it has been suggested that male cooperation may outweigh the costs of sharing paternity in situations of scarcity, of foods and of high competition levels for land or females. Female size and a large breeding territory defended by more males may force male cooperation. For males, such factors can promote an increase in reproductive success, leaving behind the cost of paternity share (Mating Systems, p277). Comb-crested jacana's (Irediparra gallinacea) has shown genetic evidence for paternity assurance. The comb-crested jacana females had one to three more mates available for copulation. In order to guarantee paternity to their male mates, the females would spend time in the territory of the male, laying her eggs.

Some taxa with high social organization are eusocial, meaning that a single female (e.g., the queen bee) or caste produces offspring while the other organisms (e.g., non-reproductive female worker bees) cooperate in caring for the young. Examples of mammalian eusociality include Damaraland mole-rats and naked mole-rats, among whom polyandry is the norm and polygyny has never been observed.

== Polyandry and infanticide avoidance ==
Infanticide avoidance is one of the major reasons animals, like mammals, are inclined to choose polyandry. Infanticide is a major cause of mortality in various mammals. Polyandry makes males uncertain of the paternity of the offspring, reducing infanticide since males avoid killing related offspring. There is evidence that polyandry is an effective strategy that is adapted by many to increase their offspring survival through the avoidance of male infanticide. This hypothesis has been confirmed in bank voles (Myodes glareolus), in which polyandrous females' offspring have a higher survival than monandrous females' offspring.

== Polyandry benefit exception: green turtles ==
High levels of multiple paternity have widely been seen and reported in snakes, marine turtles, and lizards. However, Lee and Hayes (2004) have evidence that suggests that there is no set data in green turtles that significantly shows that there are potential fitness gains through polyandry. Instead, it is suggested that the multiple mating is a result of male aggression. Both Wright and Lee and Hayes studies exhibit similar results that show a lack of support of the indirect benefits of polyandry. In addition, they pose that there is no relationship between multiple paternity and reproductive success. Multiple male paternity is present in green turtles, but no significant fitness benefits have been found. Observations done on clutches showed that there was no correlation of reproductive success when mating with multiple males.

== Callitrichidae ==
Current research suggests that polyandry is the dominant social structure in the New World monkey family Callitrichidae. The Callitrichidae includes marmosets and tamarins, two groups of small New World monkeys found in South America. Wild groups usually consist of three to ten individuals, with one reproductively active female, one or more reproductive males, and several nonreproductive helpers that can be either male or female. Cooperative polyandry is not the only mating system found in these primates. Polyandrous, monogamous, and polygynous groups can be found within the same population, and a group can even change mating systems, making it the most flexible mating system of any non-human primate. Unlike most primates who typically give birth to single young, twins are the average litter size for tamarins and marmosets. The entire group participates in raising the offspring, sharing the responsibilities of infant carrying, feeding, and grooming. The presence of nonreproductive helpers appears to be the most important factor in determining which mating system is used, as ecological and environmental variability have not been found to have a significant impact. Goldizen (1987) proposed the hypothesis that monogamy in Callitrichidae should develop only in groups with nonreproductive helpers to help raise the young, and in the absence of these helpers, both polyandrous males and females would have higher reproductive success than those in lone monogamous pairs. Indeed, in studies of Saguinus fuscicollis, common name saddle-back tamarin, no monogamous lone pairs have ever been seen to attempt a breeding cycle.

== See also ==
- Green-veined white
- Polyandry in fish
- Superfecundation
- Bibron's toadlet
