= Acromyrmex insinuator =

Scientific classification
- Kingdom: Animalia
- Phylum: Arthropoda
- Clade: Pancrustacea
- Class: Insecta
- Order: Hymenoptera
- Family: Formicidae
- Subfamily: Myrmicinae
- Genus: Acromyrmex
- Species: A. insinuator

Binomial name
- Acromyrmex insinuator Schultz, Bekkevold & Boomsma, 1998

Species of ant

Acromyrmex insinuator is a species of New World ants of the subfamily Myrmicinae of the genus Acromyrmex. It is a social parasite of another ant species, the closely related Acromyrmex echinatior. This specific parasite is of particular interest as it is an opportunity to study the development of social parasitism in the Attini tribe, and provides further evidence for Emery's rule, which theorizes social parasites among insects tend to be parasites of species or genera to which they are closely related.

== Distribution ==
Acromyrmex insinuator are found exclusively in Panama and were first discovered and studied in 1998. There have been a few laboratory studies, but the majority of data has been collected in nature through observation.

== Social parasitism ==
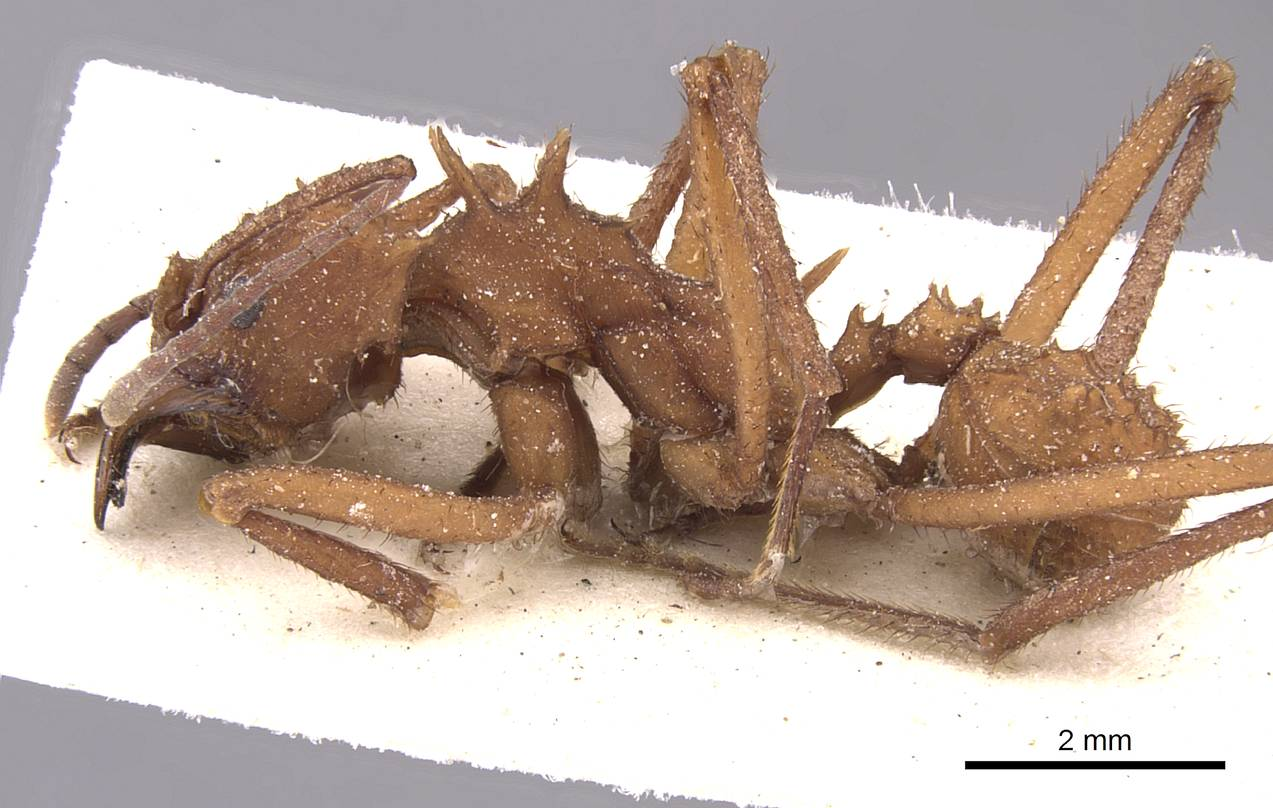
Acromyrmex echinatior, the host species

Acromyrmex insinuator is a social parasite of Acromyrmex echinatior. Unlike the three of the four other known social parasites within the Atinni tribe (Acromyrmex (Pseudoatta) argentina argentina, Acromyrmex argentina platensis and Acromyrmex sp.) who show the extreme characteristics of social parasitism, A. insinuator is an example of the relatively early development of social parasitism as they closely resemble their host and produce a working caste. This fact also leads to further data supporting Emery's rule.

Acromyrmex insinuator will produce a minor working caste that tends to the fungal garden, which is unique in comparison to the other known social parasites in the Attini tribe. The A. insinuator queen and minor workers then go on to consume the majority of the fungal garden while A. echinatior does all the scavenging required to maintain the fungal garden. However, there seems to be some sort of balance as the A. echinatior population does not suffer much from the presence of A. insinuator.

=== "Infection" ===
The method through which A. insinuator "infects" the A. echinatior colony is still undetermined. The time of A. insinuator's mating flight is near the same time of the mating flight of A. echinatior and therefore is reasonable to hypothesize that the recently inseminated A. insinuator queen joins the A. echinatior queen as she finds her new colony. However, this does not rule out the possibility that A. insinuator queen joins an A. echinatior colony that has already been found (pleometrotic).

To remain undetected by their hosts, A. insinuator has evolved to appear "chemically insignificant" as opposed to using chemical mimicry. A study done in 2007 revealed that A. insinuator workers emitted far fewer hydrocarbons in total in comparison to A. echinatior. Hydrocarbons with 29-35 carbons are used as recognition cues in A. echinatior. A decrease in the normal 29-35 carbon hydrocarbon range, while an increase in heavier 43-45 carbon hydrocarbon was discovered as the means through which A. insinuator workers remained chemically insignificant. With fewer recognition hydrocarbons being produced, and heavier hydrocarbons masking any remaining identifying aspects, A. insinuator is able to successfully infiltrate an A. echinatior colony and remain undetected.

=== Physical comparison to host ===
In comparison to A. echinatior, the females of A. insinuator are on average smaller, males are on average larger and the minor workers are relatively indistinguishable from their host counterparts. However, a more recent study has noted a decrease in the metapleural glands of the A. insinuator workers in comparison to their host. It is hypothesized this decrease in gland size represents the reduced importance for disease resistance mechanisms as the species becomes more reliant on their host's herd immunity, and more importantly - a decreased investment in the production of a worker caste. This is also a common characteristic of social parasites in that they deviate further from their commonalities with their host species.

=== Impact on host ===
While the impact A. insinuator have on their host is not well documented, it makes sense to state that they have a negative effect on the fitness of A. echinatior. A. insinuator significantly decreases the amount of food from the fungal garden that is available and the amount of space in the colony. Both of these will have a negative impact on A. echinatior's fitness by placing stricter constraints on the population.

== Colony reproduction and life cycle ==
=== Colony reproduction ===
Winged queen ants and males leave their respective colonies in large groups in a flight known as the revoada ("Flock" in English). Each female mates with multiple males to collect the 300 million sperm she needs to set up a colony.

Eventually the queen will land and look for a suitable place to begin the new colony. Only about 2-3% of queens succeed in starting a long-term colony.

=== Life cycle ===
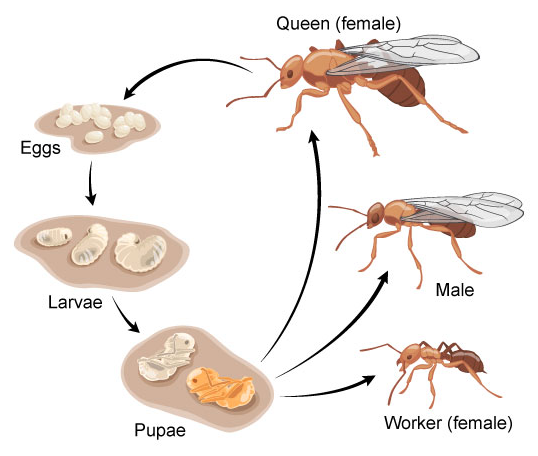
General life cycle of ants

Acromyrmex insinuator follows the general life cycle of ants. They hatch from eggs as larvae that lack both eyes and legs. Depending on whether or not they were fertilized, they will be male or female. With large appetites and the inability to forage for themselves, the larvae are completely reliant on the adult colony to provide them with food. For A. insinuator, the main source of food for the larvae is the hyphae from the fungal-garden. Due to their large intake of food, larvae grow quickly and molt often.

Once the larvae have grown to sufficient size, they undergo metamorphosis to a pupa. During this stage, reorganization takes place in which they develop into a primitive version of their adult form.

Eventually the pupae emerge in their fully-grown adult forms and depending on the amount of food they received and their sex, they will either be designated as a Queen, Female or Male worker.

== Impact on humans and ecosystem ==
While A. insinuator specifically has no direct impact on humans, leaf-cutter ants overall are a significant problem in many areas of the world, but also vital in their ecosystems. As dominant herbivores, some colonies are cutting up to 13% of the standing vegetation in their territory per year. The large size of the ant colonies (30-600m^{2}) cause many issues ranging from crop devastation to reducing land surfaces useless as the ground beneath is unstable.

However, the removal of these ants could significantly disturb local ecosystems due to their importance in soil enrichment, removal of plant material, and stimulation of new plant growth.

== Wolbachia ==
Like many arthropods, A. insinuator are infected with Wolbachia bacteria. Notably A. insinuator hold additional strains not found in their host. The effects of the Wolbachia strains in A. insinuator have not been documented.

== Unanswered questions ==
It is still undetermined how A. insinuator infects A. echinatior colonies or how deleterious the effects on their host A. insinuator are. Additionally, the effect Wolbachia bacteria strains that are unique to A. insinuator may affect the species in comparison to their close relatives A. echinatior.

== See also ==
- List of leafcutter ants
