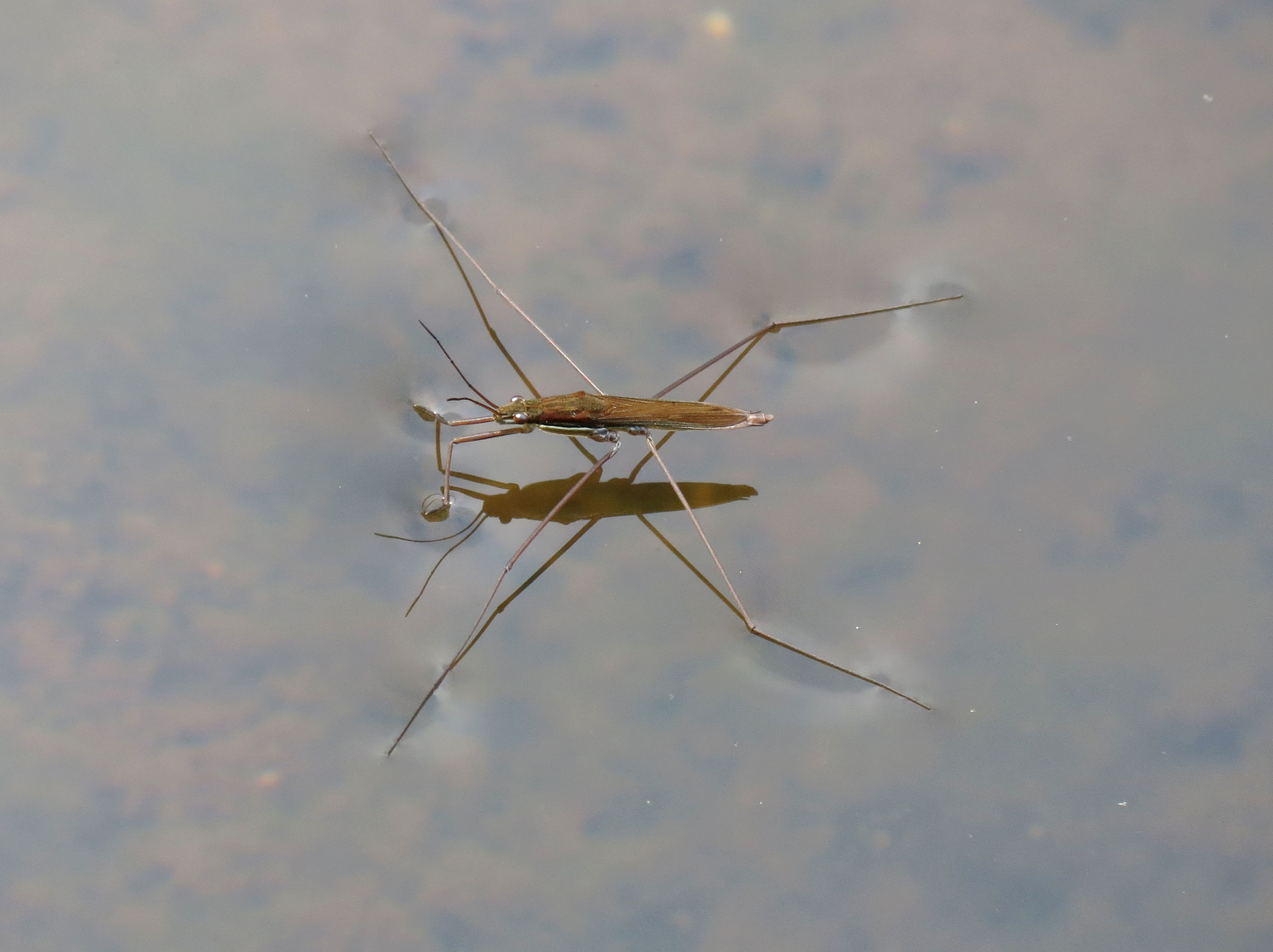

Scientific classification
- Domain: Eukaryota
- Kingdom: Animalia
- Phylum: Arthropoda
- Class: Insecta
- Order: Hemiptera
- Suborder: Heteroptera
- Family: Gerridae
- Genus: Limnoporus
- Species: L. notabilis

Binomial name
- Limnoporus notabilis (Drake & Hottes, 1925)

= Limnoporus notabilis =

Species of true bug

Limnoporus notabilis is a species of water strider in the family Gerridae. It is found in North America.
