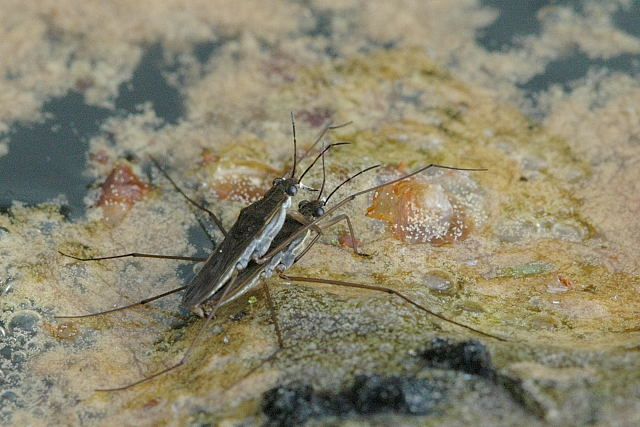
- A pair of common water striders copulating

Scientific classification
- Kingdom: Animalia
- Phylum: Arthropoda
- Class: Insecta
- Order: Hemiptera
- Suborder: Heteroptera
- Family: Gerridae
- Subfamily: Gerrinae
- Genus: Gerris
- Species: G. lacustris

Binomial name
- Gerris lacustris (Linnaeus, 1758)

Synonyms
- Cimex lacustris Linnaeus, 1758; Gerris brevirostris Bergroth, 1893

= Gerris lacustris =

Species of true bug

Gerris lacustris, commonly known as the common pond skater or common water strider, is a species of water strider, found across Europe.

== Description ==
Water striders vary in length ranging between 8 millimetres (0.31 in) and 10 mm (0.39 in) in size. Their body shape is very slender and elongated. They have six legs; the first pair is short and stubby while the other two pairs are thin and elongated which are used for moving over the water surface which we call "walking on water". The first pair of legs is used for holding its prey, the middle pair propels the bug along the surface of the water with either a rowing or jumping motion, and the hind pair of legs is used as rudders. The entire body of G. lacustris including its legs is covered with many tiny hairs that have a wax-like coating. G. lacustris are dark brown in colour. Water striders have very strong sucking mouthparts known as a rostrum or beak.

== Reproduction ==
G. lacustris females are usually significantly larger than the males and the egg production rate is limited by the amount of food resources that are available to the female; the more food there is the more eggs the female lays. The adult water striders emerge around April and May. It is around this time that females lay eggs where the eggs undergo a process that takes about 12 to 14 days to develop before they are able to hatch. Hatching doesn't necessarily follow the eggs when their development is complete; hatching heavily depends on the temperature that the egg is exposed to in its environment. After hatching, G. lacustris go through another separate development process known as incomplete metamorphosis. In this process, the larvae or nymphs progress through a series of moults which basically are stages known as instars. There are five instars in the developmental process, with each one progressively longer than the last. The incomplete metamorphosis process usually lasts about 24 to 30 days for larvae to become an adult. G. lacutris males prolong their mating in the presence of other males because they are guarding their female against harassment from the other males. It was found that males influence the duration of copulation while the females influence the copulation frequency.

== Food and nutrients ==
G. lacustris is a predatory insect. The species hunts on or below water surface for insects and other small invertebrates using their strong forelegs which end with claws. They also have piercing and sucking mouthparts in order to consume other small insects that fall into the water surface and to feed on live and dead insects such as Culiseta annulata, non-biting midge, and other water invertebrates. With their front pair of legs they’re able to detect ripples and sense vibrations in the surface film from struggling insects and handle or grasp their prey. G. lacustris eat other small invertebrates and digest them internally.

== Adaptations ==
Water striders have the ability to move quickly on the water surface and have hydrophobic legs. On average, a water strider can move 1.5 metre per second by paddling forward with the middle pair of legs while the forelegs and hind legs act as a rudder. Waters striders also have the ability to stand effortlessly on water due to their non-wetting legs. Because they have tiny hairs with nanogrooves that cover their bodies, they have a water resistance effect. Water striders rely on surface tension to walk on top of water. Through evolution, water striders have developed a unique arrangement of legs which gives them the gliding ability with greatly elongated med-legs. The Hox gene "ultrabithorax" lengthens legs in insects. If its pool should dry out during a drought, a water strider will travel overland to find wetter pastures to settle in.

The front pair of legs of a water strider do not act as a rudder - they are very short and are held up in the air, ready to grab prey. They also do not feel the vibrations in the water of prey—the middle and hind pair of legs do this.
