= Gerris comatus =

Scientific classification
- Domain: Eukaryota
- Kingdom: Animalia
- Phylum: Arthropoda
- Class: Insecta
- Order: Hemiptera
- Suborder: Heteroptera
- Family: Gerridae
- Genus: Gerris
- Species: G. comatus

Binomial name
- Gerris comatus Drake & Hottes, 1925

Species of true bug

Gerris comatus is a species of water strider in the family Gerridae. It is found in North America.

== Subspecies ==
These two subspecies belong to the species Gerris comatus:

- Gerris comatus comatus Drake & Hottes, 1925
- Gerris comatus mickeli Drake & Hottes, 1925
