= Gerris buenoi =

Scientific classification
- Kingdom: Animalia
- Phylum: Arthropoda
- Clade: Pancrustacea
- Class: Insecta
- Order: Hemiptera
- Suborder: Heteroptera
- Family: Gerridae
- Genus: Gerris
- Species: G. buenoi

Binomial name
- Gerris buenoi Kirkaldy, 1911

Species of true bug

Gerris buenoi is a species of water strider that belongs to the family Gerridae. It was first identified in 1911 and is native to continental USA and Canada. Individuals of this species are small in size and have modified appendages, allowing them to float and "skate" along the surface of the water. G. buenoi can be found near the shoreline of freshwater ponds and small lakes, where they hunt for terrestrial insects that have fallen into the water.

== Habitat ==
G. buenoi is an aquatic Hemipteran that often lives in slow moving or still waters across North America. Members of Gerridae have very diverse habitat preferences, ranging from open ocean to small lakes and streams. G. buenoi are adapted to freshwater and are specifically found amongst thick vegetation, such as bullrushes, tall grasses, and lilypads at the shorelines of ponds and lakes. They are considered habitat generalists, but often prefer environments devoid of other water strider species. Members of this species are very abundant during spring and early summer, but tend to show seasonality and numbers decline in the late summer.

== Behaviour and physical characteristics ==
=== Morphology ===
G. Buenoi is very similar in morphology to G. incurvatus. Adult individuals are roughly 8-10mm in length. Like most other Gerrids, they are polymorphic, and multiple forms of wings exist to correspond with different seasons and living conditions. Females tend to be larger than males. This species is hemimetabolous and has five nymph stages. The fifth instar of G. buenoi is distinguishable from other members of Gerridae by pale, arrow-shaped markings present on their mesothorax. Water striders have all developed elongated mid-legs (in comparison to their hind and forelegs) as adaptations to life on the surface of water. Their front legs are short and raptorial, making them useful for prey capture.

=== Locomotion ===
G. buenoi's extended mid-leg adaptation gives them increased thrust along the surface of the water, and hind-legs act as "rudders" to control movement direction. These extended legs cause Gerrids to disperse their weight across the surface of the water, allowing them to skate around with ease. Tarsi have water repellent hairs that prevent submergence, and mechanoreceptors are present on their limbs which orient them in the direction of stimuli by sensing waves in the water. This allows individuals to easily locate and move toward mates or prey, and escape predators.

== Feeding methods ==
=== Diet and predators ===
G. buenoi is a predacious insect that feeds primarily on other insects. It is opportunistic in that it most often feeds on small, struggling prey that has fallen into the water. Feeding consists of locating prey, capturing prey using raptorial front legs, and moving to a safe location before consuming it using piercing/sucking mouthparts. Large prey such as damselflies can be the target of groups of water bugs feeding all at once. Common predators of G. buenoi include fishing spiders, diving beetle larvae, dragonfly naiads, and backswimmers. Some parasites that target this species include red water mites and scelionid wasps.

=== Cannibalism ===
While predation from other arthropods is the greatest mortality factor in G. buenoi, predation from other individuals of the same species is common. However, first and second instar individuals are especially prone to intra-cohort cannibalism. During early stages of development, if food shortages occur, nymphs are most likely to resort to cannibalism. If G. buenoi are raised in an environment lacking predators, cannibalism can improve growth and development of certain individuals; which can result in the heaviest possible adults.

== Reproduction ==
G. buenoi generations live for approximately one year. Adults survive winter months and lay eggs in the spring. There are five nymph instars which take roughly two months to reach adulthood. Eggs are typically laid on the underside of aquatic vegetation and other debris found floating in the water. Females control the majority of mating interactions due to their large size. Convenience polyandry is common in G. buenoi and Males are known to frequently harass females if the ratio of males to females is high. In this situation it is adaptive for females to accept as many mating attempts as possible, because a great deal of energy would be used trying to repel males attempting to copulate.

=== Diving behaviour ===
Like other water striders, G. buenoi is known to perform underwater basking behaviour. This process occurs when individuals submerge themselves under water in cold months when the temperature of the water is warmer than that of the air. Both sexes perform this behaviour, but it has the most benefits to females in that it increases gonad development time and egg production rate. Increased temperatures have the ability to increase reproductive fecundity.

=== Sexual selection ===
Female hunger is the single greatest determinate of mating rate in G. buenoi. In fact, if females go for extended periods of time without food, mating rates decrease by around 50%. Similarly to most other water strider species, large G. buenoi males are preferred by females. In situations where food is limited, small males are at a disadvantage. When poorly fed, females become reluctant to mate due to high energy expenditure, and large males are selected based on their ability to overcome female reluctance.

Antagonistic coevolution has arisen in G. buenoi, as well as other members of Gerris. This is a seemingly maladaptive process and it occurs when males and females struggle to reproduce with one another due to conflicting reproductive patterns. Antagonistic coevolution has the ability to hinder reproductive success of populations of water striders, and is driven by males that have high reproductive rates and females that have low reproductive rates. Post-copulatory processes such as sperm competition and cryptic female choice can also impact reproductive success.
