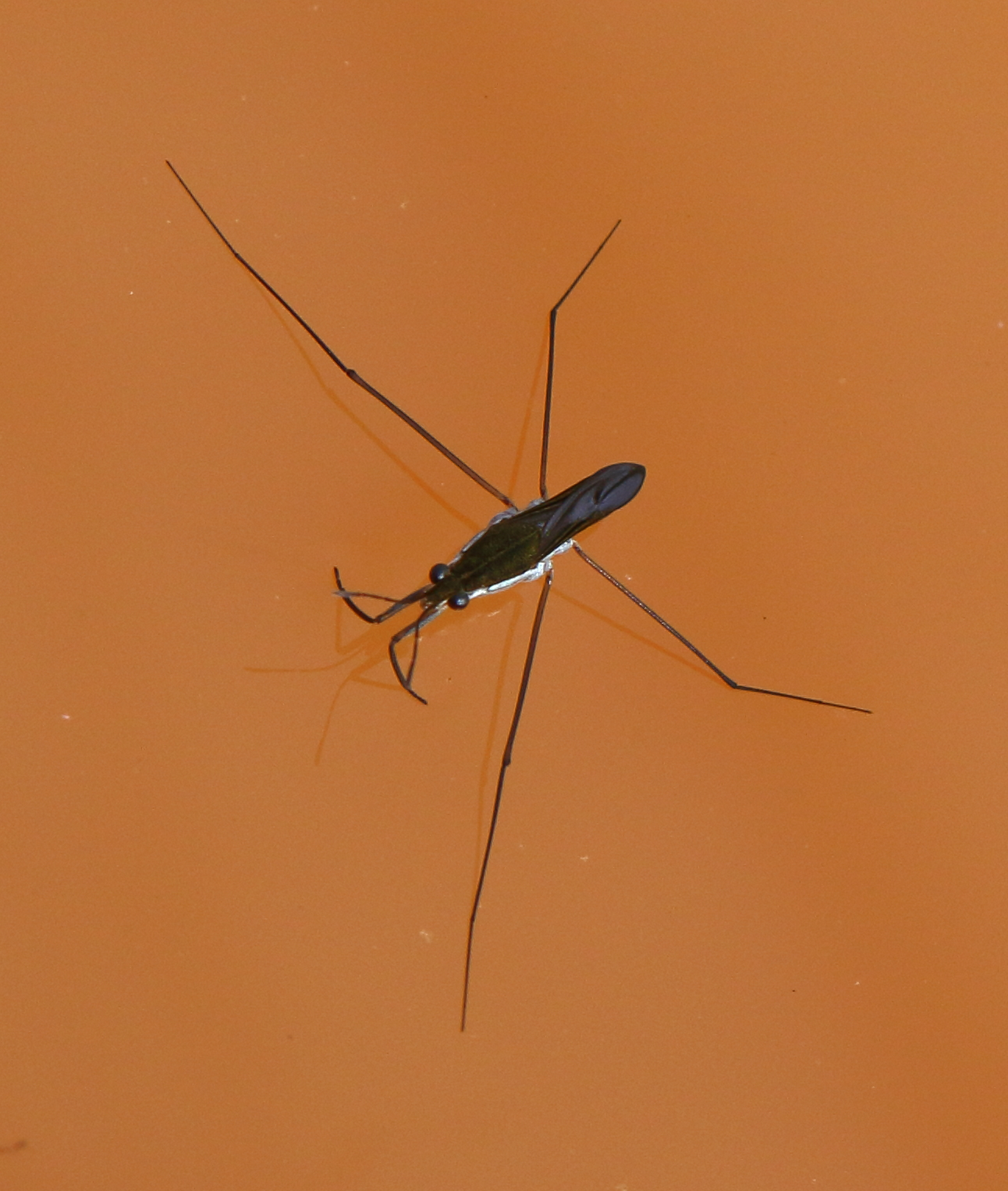
- Gerris swakopensis, South Africa

Scientific classification
- Domain: Eukaryota
- Kingdom: Animalia
- Phylum: Arthropoda
- Class: Insecta
- Order: Hemiptera
- Suborder: Heteroptera
- Family: Gerridae
- Genus: Gerris
- Species: G. swakopensis

Binomial name
- Gerris swakopensis Stål, 1858

= Gerris swakopensis =

Species of true bug

Gerris swakopensis is an Afrotropical species of true bug. Common names include pond skater and water strider.

It is aquatic, found in habitats with standing freshwater, such as ponds, pools, and backwaters of streams.

== Gallery ==
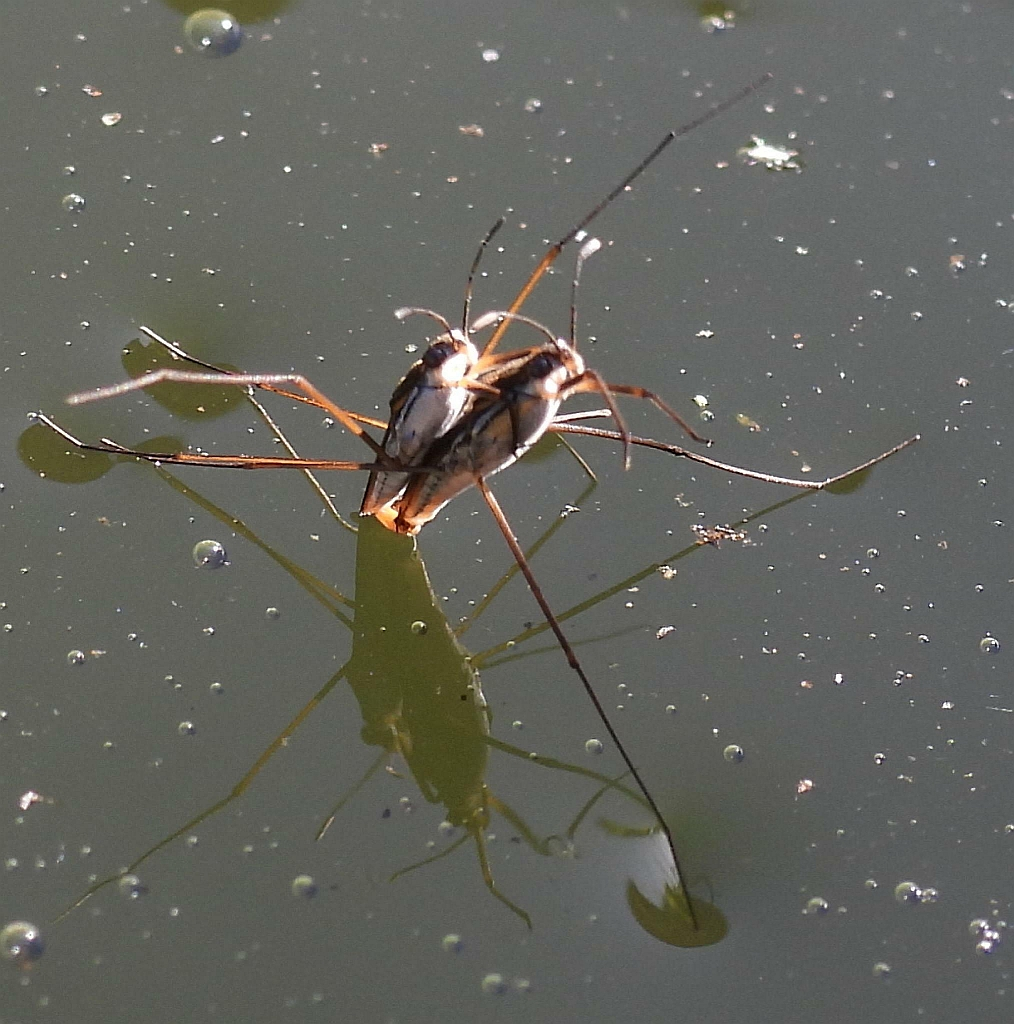
A mating pair of Gerris swakopensis

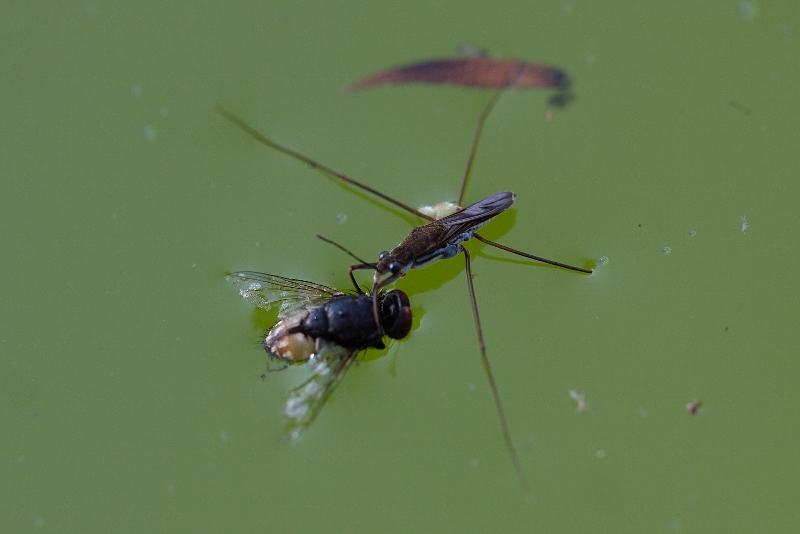
Gerris swakopensis eating a fly
