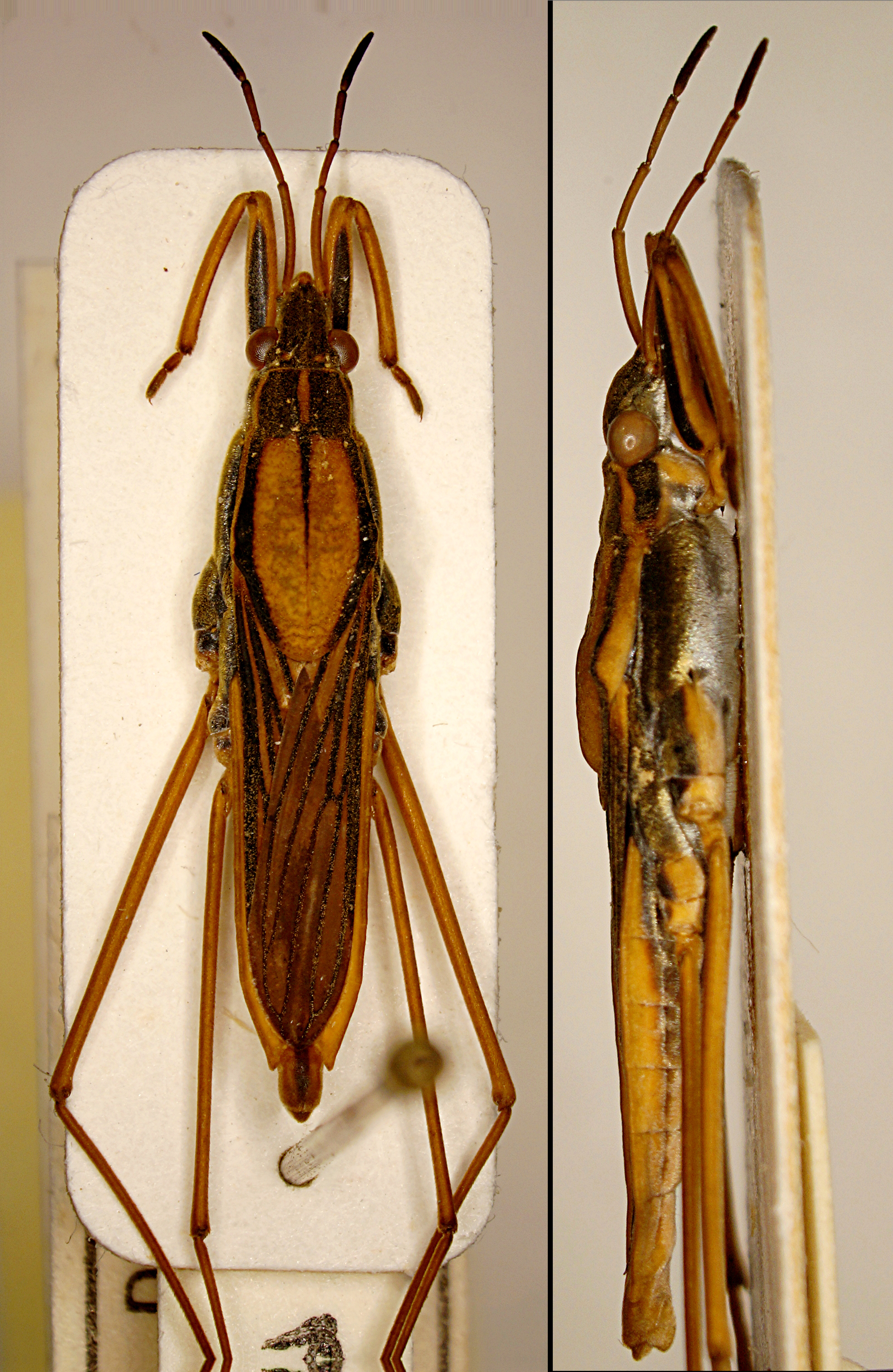
- Gerris costae fieberi Stichel, 1938, male, Syria

Scientific classification
- Kingdom: Animalia
- Phylum: Arthropoda
- Clade: Pancrustacea
- Class: Insecta
- Order: Hemiptera
- Suborder: Heteroptera
- Family: Gerridae
- Genus: Gerris
- Species: G. costae

Binomial name
- Gerris costae (Herrich-Schäffer, 1850)

= Gerris costae =

Species of true bug

Gerris costae is a Palearctic species of true bug. It is aquatic. It is commonly known as the Moorland Pondskater, and has been found in France, Ireland, United Kingdom, The Balkans, and Upper Italy/Switzerland.

It is known to have three apparent subspecies:

- Gerris costae costae
- Gerris costae fieberi
- Gerris costae poissoni
