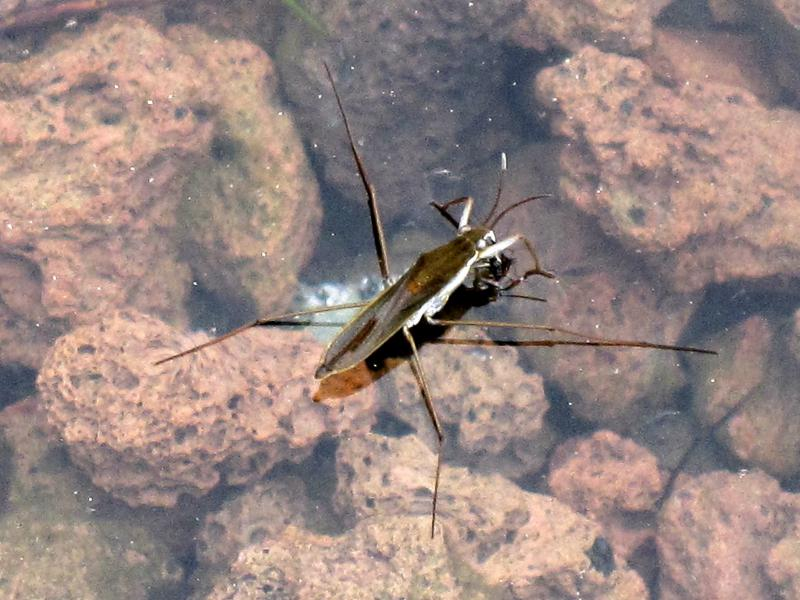
- In the Netherlands

Scientific classification
- Kingdom: Animalia
- Phylum: Arthropoda
- Clade: Pancrustacea
- Class: Insecta
- Order: Hemiptera
- Suborder: Heteroptera
- Family: Gerridae
- Genus: Gerris
- Species: G. thoracicus

Binomial name
- Gerris thoracicus Schummel, 1832

= Gerris thoracicus =

Species of true bug

Gerris thoracicus is a Palearctic species of true bug.
