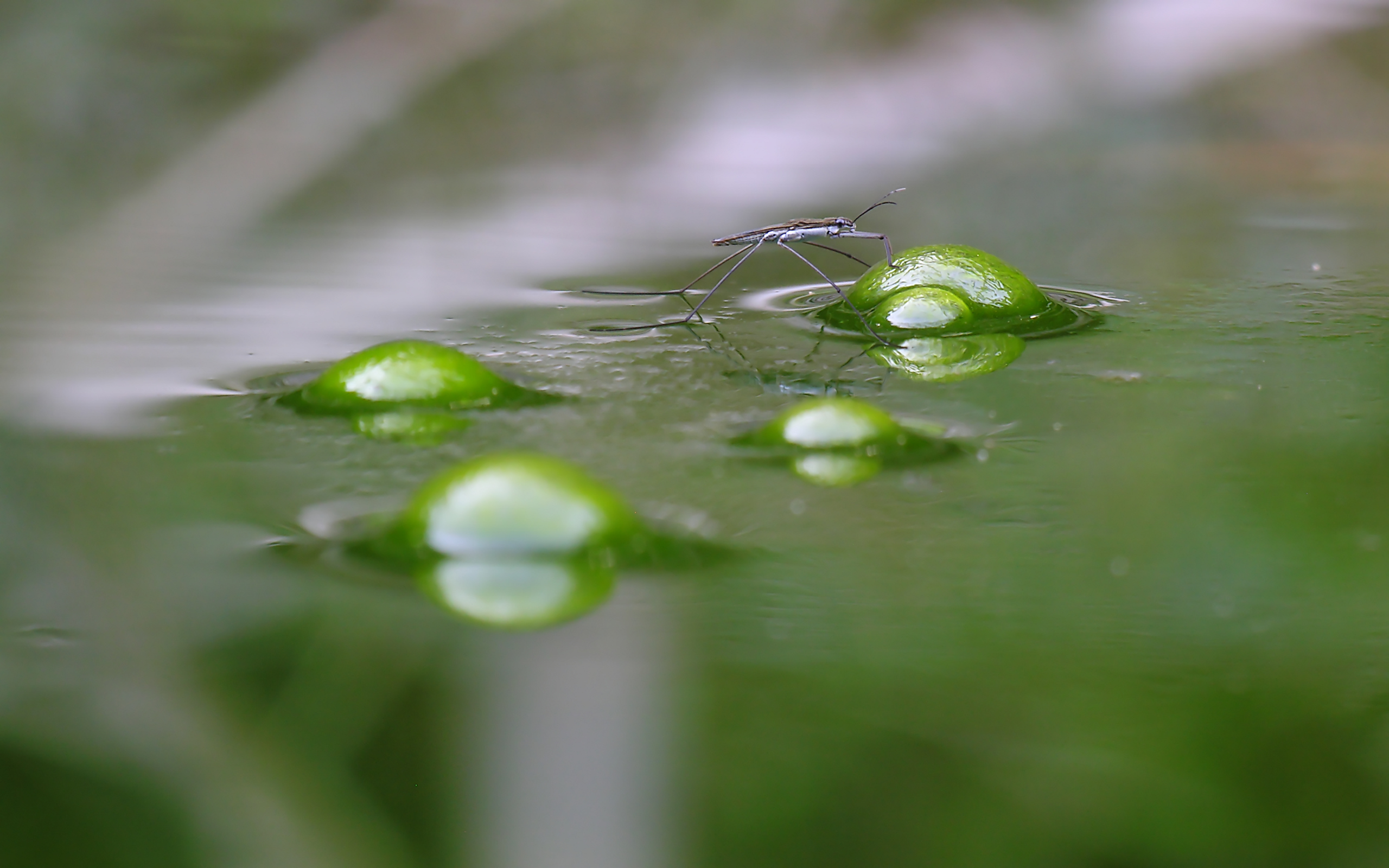

Scientific classification
- Kingdom: Animalia
- Phylum: Arthropoda
- Class: Insecta
- Order: Hemiptera
- Suborder: Heteroptera
- Family: Gerridae
- Genus: Aquarius
- Species: A. paludum

Binomial name
- Aquarius paludum (Fabricius, 1794)

= Aquarius paludum =

Species of true bug

Aquarius paludum is a species of pond skater in the family Gerridae. It was described in 1794 by Johan Christian Fabricius. It is widely distributed in the low and middle latitudes of Eurasia, from western Europe to East Asia.

== Range ==
In the United Kingdom, Aquarius paludum is found across England and Wales, and is one of the larger species of pond skater there. It can be found at ponds, rivers, lakes and streams mainly in South East England.

== Diet ==
Aquarius paludum, like other pond skaters, eats insects, insect larvae, and spiders that get too close to the water. It kills its prey by piercing them with its proboscis and then injecting venom.

== Similar species ==
Aquarius paludum is most similar to Aquarius najas as the two species are larger than other pond skater species in Britain. The difference between the two is that A. paludum has large, upward facing spines that go all the way down to the tip of the abdomen and a yellow line on the side of the pronotum. A. najas has no yellow line and smaller spines. Another similar species to the two is Limnoporus rufoscutellatus, a pond skater that is not in the same genus that is established in Ireland but is rare in Great Britain. The difference between them is that L. rufoscutellatus has a reddish centre of the protonum.
