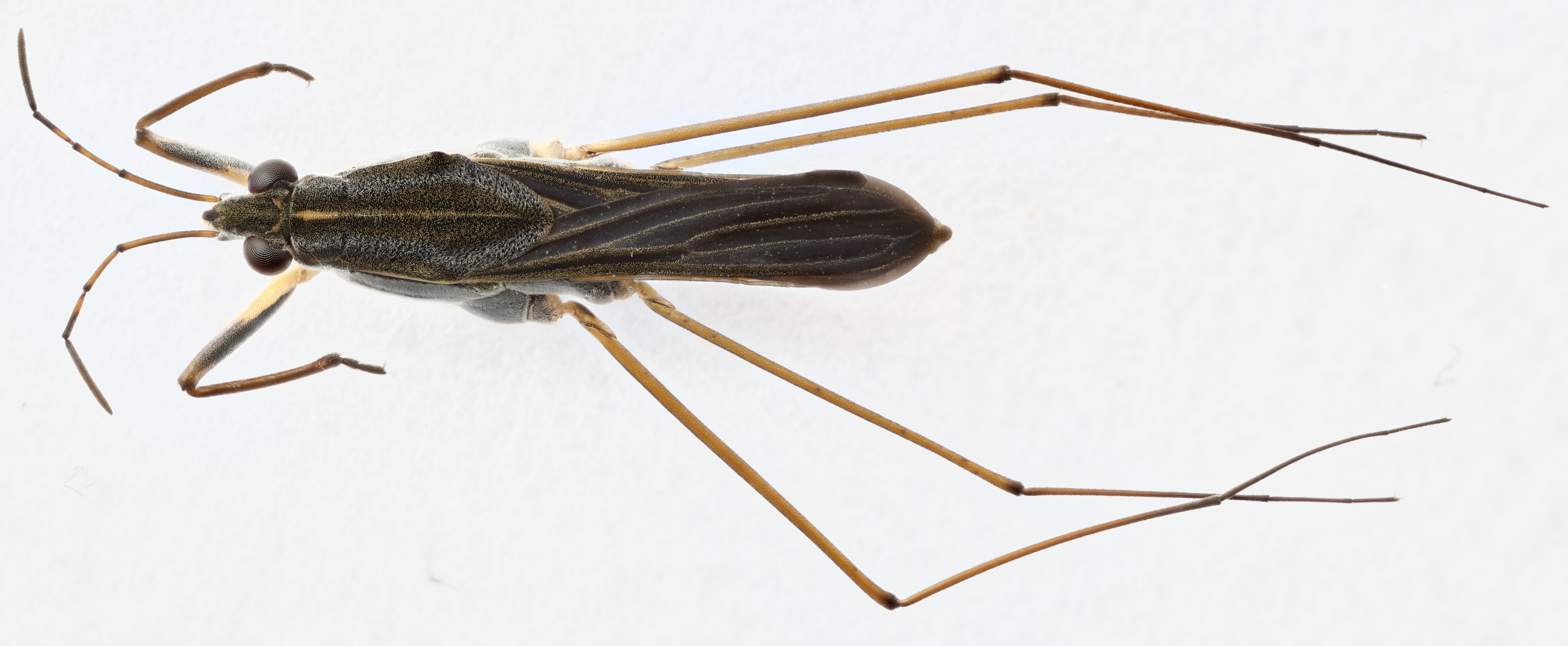

Scientific classification
- Kingdom: Animalia
- Phylum: Arthropoda
- Clade: Pancrustacea
- Class: Insecta
- Order: Hemiptera
- Suborder: Heteroptera
- Family: Gerridae
- Genus: Gerris
- Species: G. marginatus

Binomial name
- Gerris marginatus Say, 1832

= Gerris marginatus =

Species of true bug

Gerris marginatus is a species of water strider in the family Gerridae. It is found in Central America, North America, and South America.
