= Gerris argentatus =

- Gerris argentatus female in the Netherlands

Scientific classification
- Kingdom: Animalia
- Phylum: Arthropoda
- Clade: Pancrustacea
- Class: Insecta
- Order: Hemiptera
- Suborder: Heteroptera
- Family: Gerridae
- Genus: Gerris
- Species: G. argentatus

Binomial name
- Gerris argentatus Schummel, 1832

Species of true bug

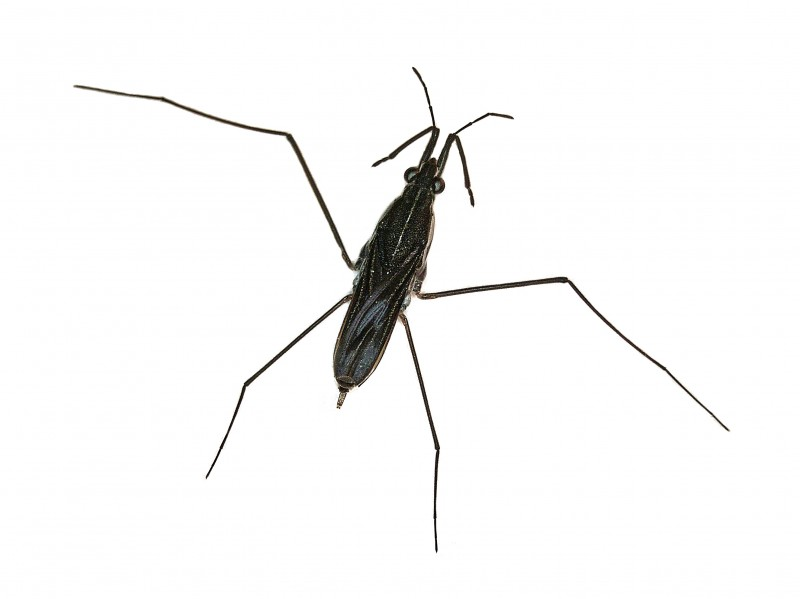
Male Gerris argentatus bug

Gerris argentatus is a Palearctic species of true bug. It is aquatic.
