= Gerris incognitus =

Scientific classification
- Domain: Eukaryota
- Kingdom: Animalia
- Phylum: Arthropoda
- Class: Insecta
- Order: Hemiptera
- Suborder: Heteroptera
- Family: Gerridae
- Genus: Gerris
- Species: G. incognitus

Binomial name
- Gerris incognitus Drake & Hottes, 1925

Species of true bug

Gerris incognitus is a species of water strider in the family Gerridae. It is found in North America.
