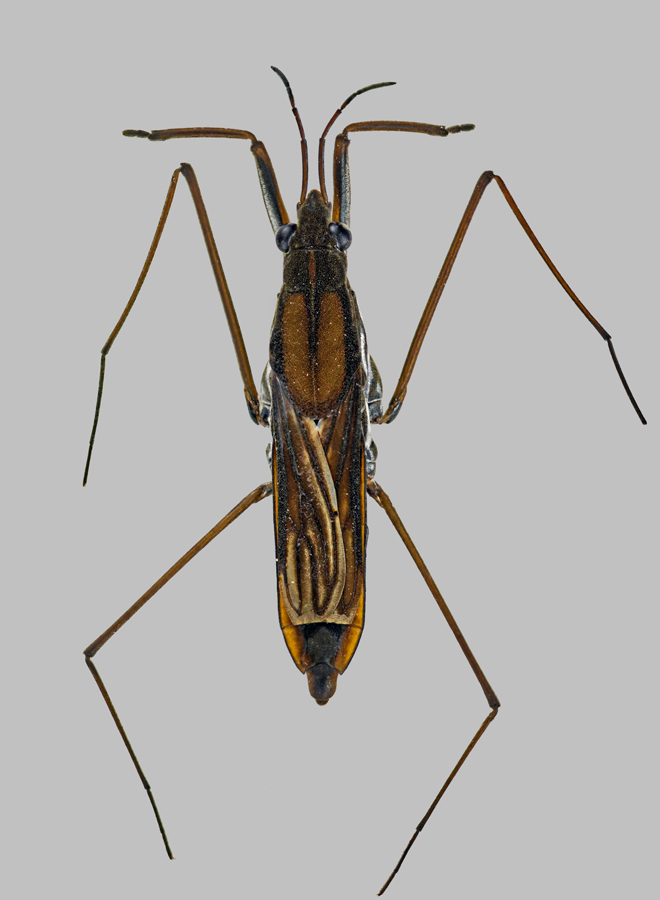
- Gerris lateralis Finland

Scientific classification
- Kingdom: Animalia
- Phylum: Arthropoda
- Clade: Pancrustacea
- Class: Insecta
- Order: Hemiptera
- Suborder: Heteroptera
- Family: Gerridae
- Genus: Gerris
- Species: G. lateralis

Binomial name
- Gerris lateralis Schummel, 1832

= Gerris lateralis =

Species of true bug

Gerris lateralis is a Palearctic species of true bug. It is aquatic.
