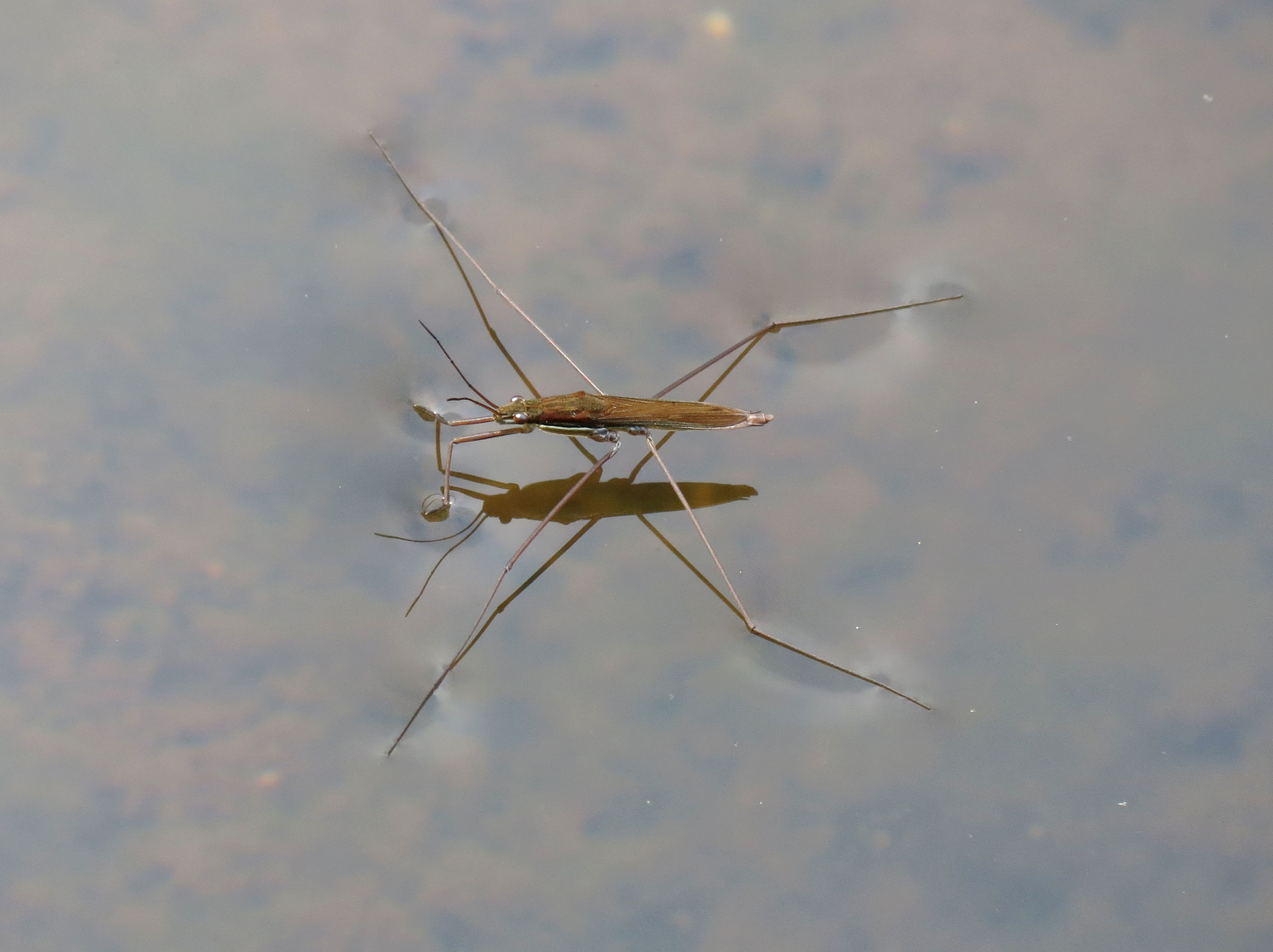
- Limnoporus notabilis

Scientific classification
- Kingdom: Animalia
- Phylum: Arthropoda
- Clade: Pancrustacea
- Class: Insecta
- Order: Hemiptera
- Suborder: Heteroptera
- Family: Gerridae
- Subfamily: Gerrinae
- Genus: Limnoporus; Stål, 1868

= Limnoporus =

Genus of true bugs

Limnoporus is a genus of water striders in the family Gerridae. There are six extant described species in Limnoporus.

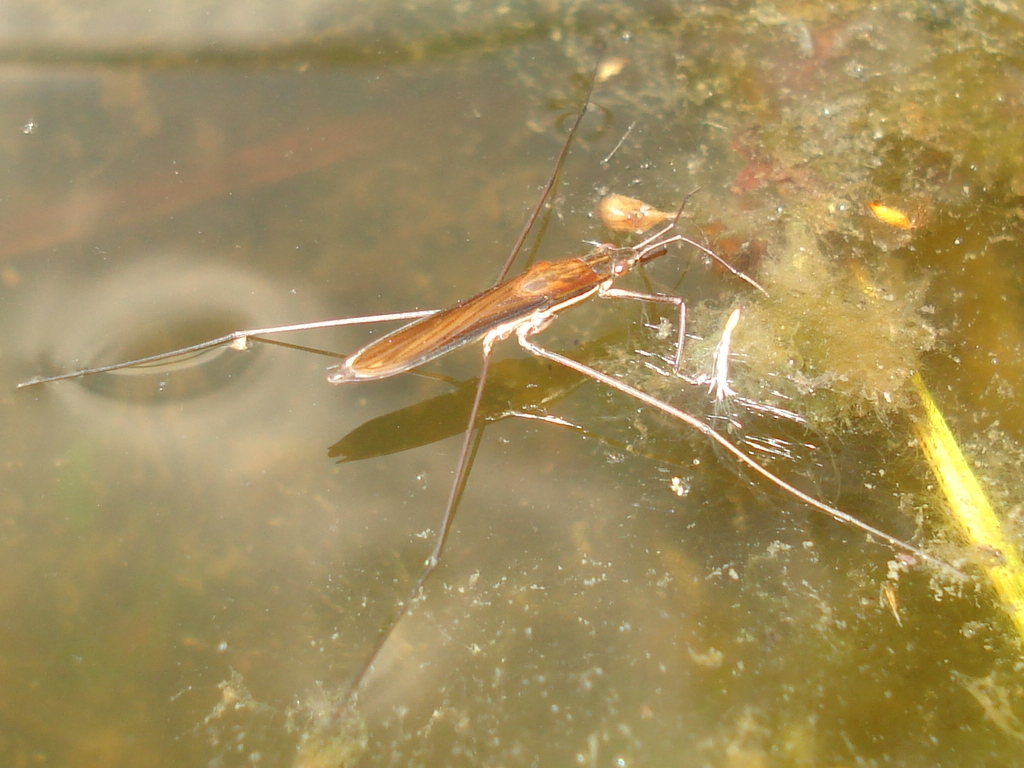
Limnoporus rufoscutellatus

== Species ==
These six current species belong to the genus Limnoporus:

- Limnoporus canaliculatus (Say, 1832)
- Limnoporus dissortis (Drake & Harris, 1930)
- Limnoporus esakii (Miyamoto, 1958)
- Limnoporus genitalis (Miyamoto, 1958)
- Limnoporus notabilis (Drake & Hottes, 1925)
- Limnoporus rufoscutellatus (Latreille, 1807)

This one extinct species is known only from fossils:

- Limnoporus wilsoni Andersen, 1998
