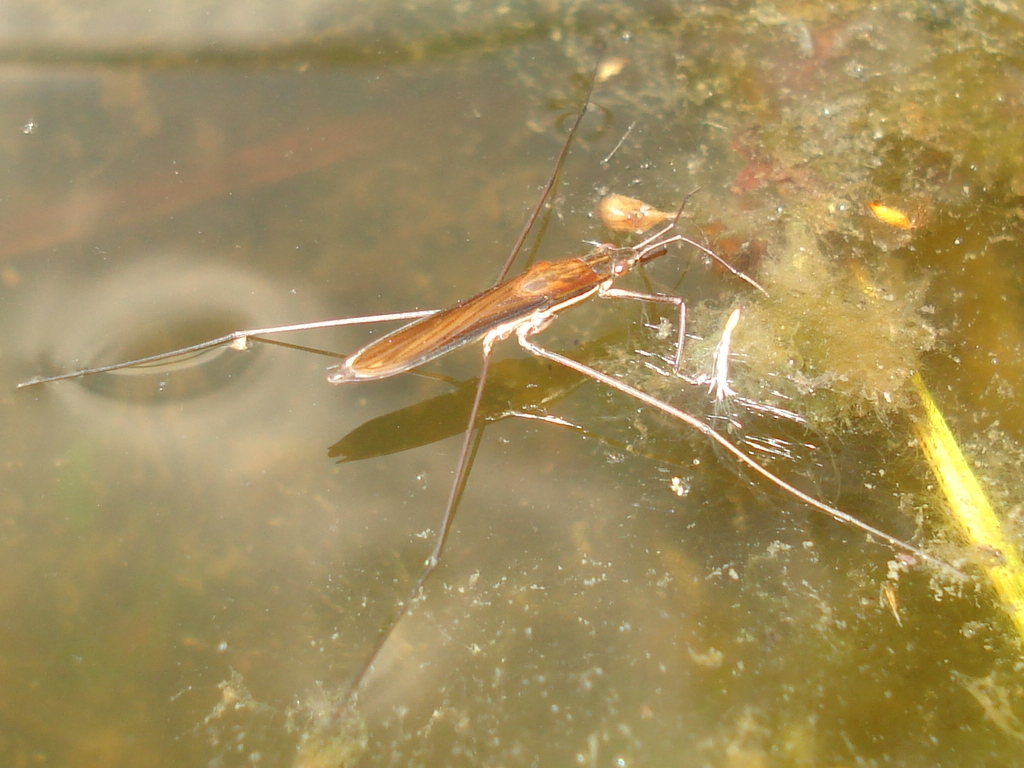

Scientific classification
- Kingdom: Animalia
- Phylum: Arthropoda
- Class: Insecta
- Order: Hemiptera
- Suborder: Heteroptera
- Family: Gerridae
- Genus: Limnoporus
- Species: L. rufoscutellatus

Binomial name
- Limnoporus rufoscutellatus (Latreille1807)

Synonyms
- Gerris nearcticus Kelton; Gerris rufoscutellatus Latreille; Limnoporus nearcticus Kelton

= Limnoporus rufoscutellatus =

Species of true bug

Limnoporus rufoscutellatus is a species of pond skater in the family Gerridae described by Pierre André Latreille in 1807.

== Range ==
Limnoporus rufoscutellatus lives across Europe, Russia, Northern Canada and Alaska.

== Similar species ==
Limnoporus rufoscutellatus has established itself in Ireland, but is still rare in Great Britain. In Great Britain, it is one of the three larger species there, the other two being Aquarius paludum and Aquarius najas. Aquarius paludum has a yellow line along the side of the protonum and has upward facing spines all the way down to the tip of the abdomen, Limnoporus rufoscutellatus lacks these features. Aquarius najas has shorter spines and no unique features on the pronotum. Limnoporus rufoscutellatus has a reddish centre of the pronotum.
