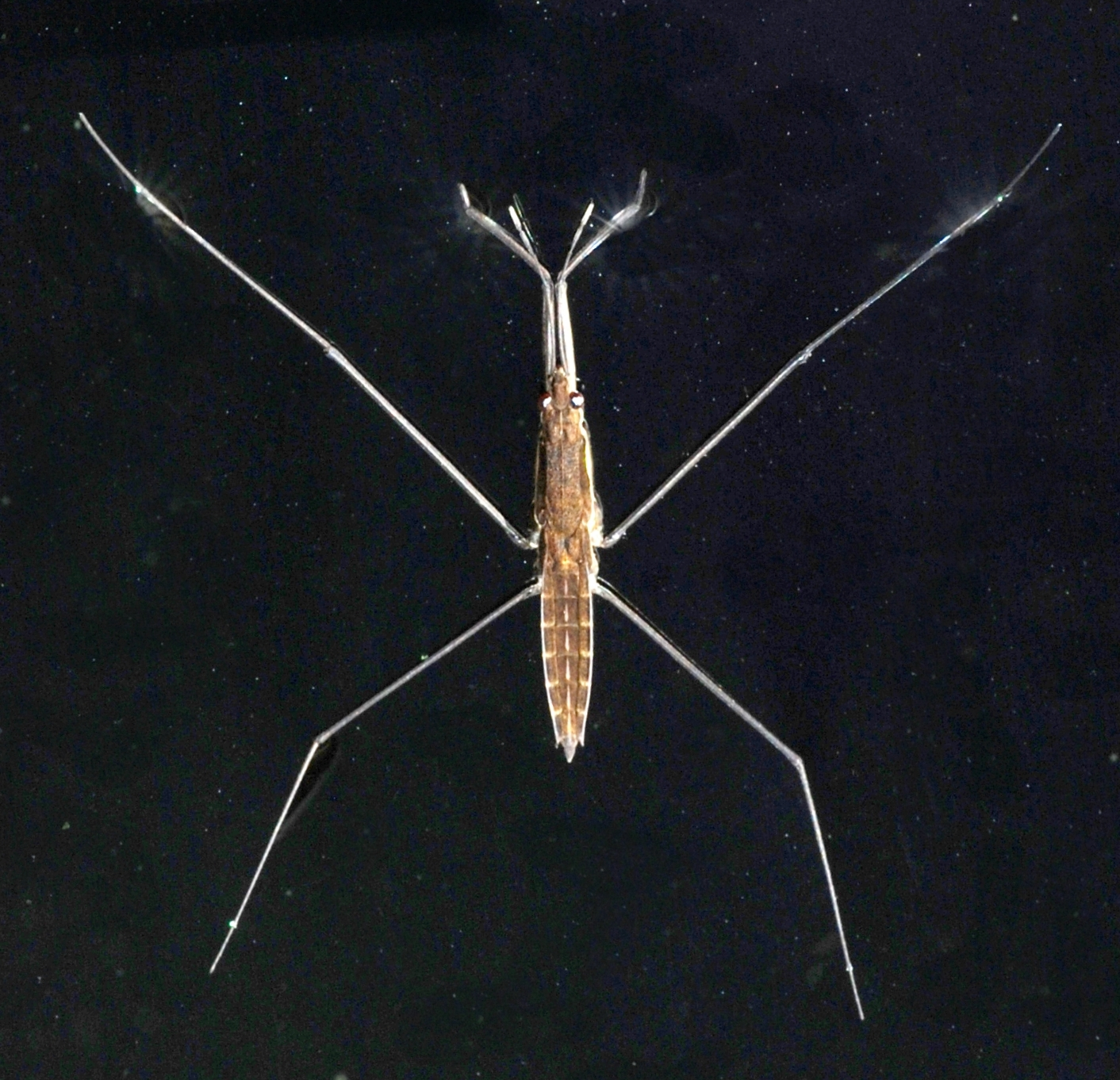

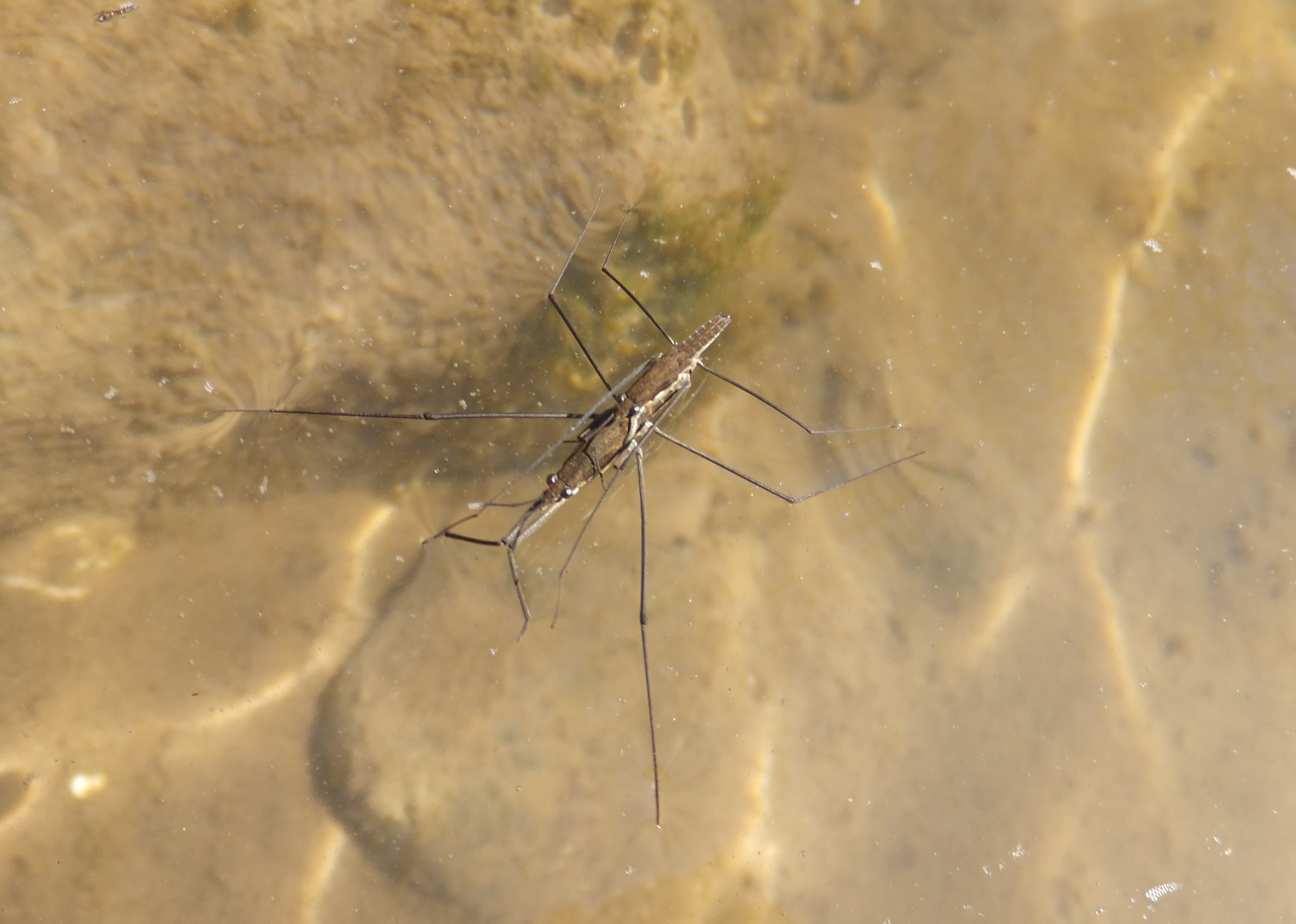
- Single individual above, mating couple below

Scientific classification
- Domain: Eukaryota
- Kingdom: Animalia
- Phylum: Arthropoda
- Class: Insecta
- Order: Hemiptera
- Suborder: Heteroptera
- Family: Gerridae
- Genus: Aquarius
- Species: A. najas

Binomial name
- Aquarius najas (De Geer, 1773)

Synonyms
- Gerris najas (De Geer 1773)

= Aquarius najas =

Species of true bug

Aquarius najas, also known as the river skater, is a European species of water strider. It was formerly known as Gerris najas, but the subgenus Aquarius was elevated to generic rank in 1990 on the basis of phylogenetic analysis.

== Habitat ==
This species generally require moving waters, living in places like the stony margins of rivers.

== Appearance ==
Aquarius najas is among the largest species of water striders, as typical of members of the genus Aquarius (including another European species, the on average marginally smaller A. paludum). Adult females of A. najas average 16.5 mm (0.65 in) long and males about 30% smaller. In northern Europe it is wingless, but in central and southern Europe it often has wings.

== Behaviour ==
Aquarius najas spend the winter as adults. In the spring, they form pairs, and before mating, row about together on the surface during the daytime. At night, they separate, and the females lay their eggs beneath the water in closely packed patches. Normally the eggs are laid on the surface of flat stones. Males may guard females after copulation to prevent other males from competing. It has been claimed that males may remain paired with females for several weeks.
