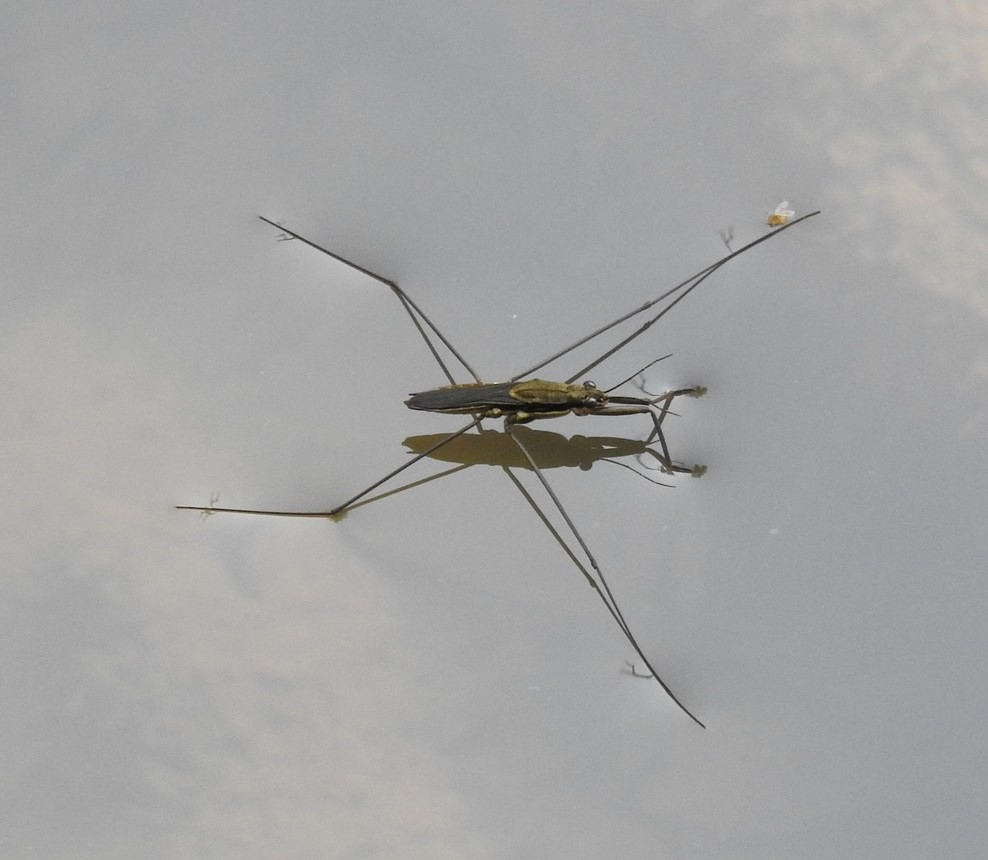

Scientific classification
- Domain: Eukaryota
- Kingdom: Animalia
- Phylum: Arthropoda
- Class: Insecta
- Order: Hemiptera
- Suborder: Heteroptera
- Family: Gerridae
- Genus: Aquarius
- Species: A. conformis

Binomial name
- Aquarius conformis (Uhler, 1878)

Synonyms
- Gerris conformis Hygrotrechus conformis

= Aquarius conformis =

Species of true bug

Aquarius conformis is a species of water strider in the family Gerridae. It is found in eastern North America from Quebec west to Wisconsin and south to Florida and Mexico.

Adults reach lengths of 15–16.5 mm. Aquarius conformis is part of the A. elongatus species group, being most closely related to A. nebularis, a species also found in eastern North America.
