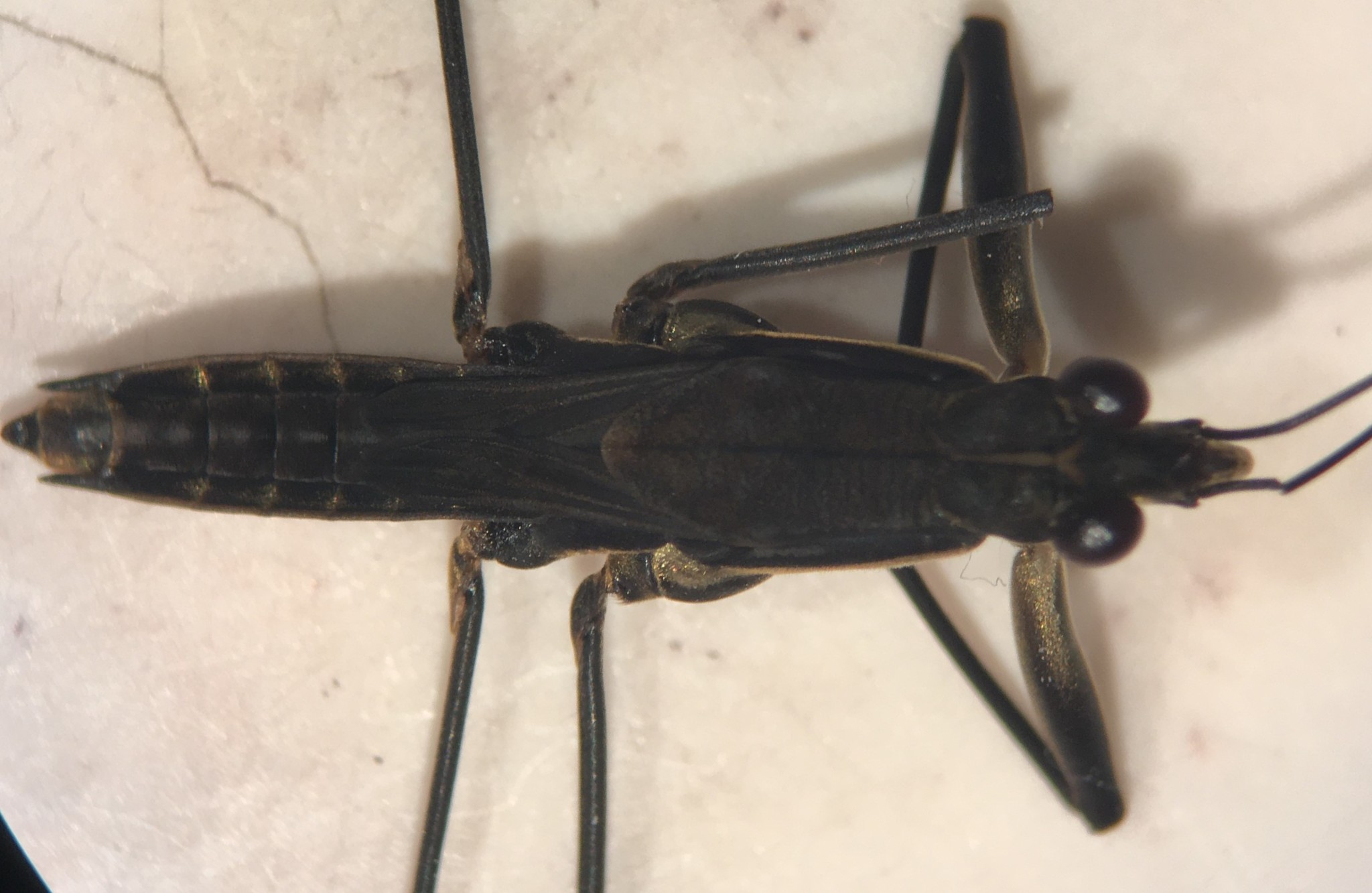

Scientific classification
- Kingdom: Animalia
- Phylum: Arthropoda
- Class: Insecta
- Order: Hemiptera
- Suborder: Heteroptera
- Family: Gerridae
- Genus: Aquarius
- Species: A. nebularis

Binomial name
- Aquarius nebularis (Drake and Hottes, 1925)

Synonyms
- Gerris nebularis Drake and Hottes, 1925

= Aquarius nebularis =

Species of true bug

Aquarius nebularis is a species of water strider in the family Gerridae. It is found in the eastern United States from New York south to central Florida and west to Louisiana, Arkansas, and Iowa.

Adults reach lengths of 14–16 mm. Aquarius nebularis is part of the A. elongatus species group, being most closely related to A. conformis, a species also found in eastern North America.
