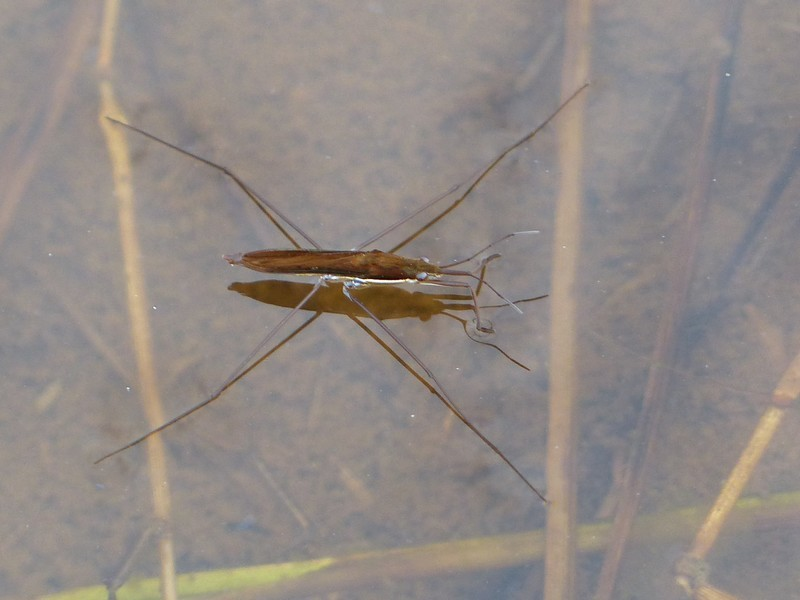

Scientific classification
- Domain: Eukaryota
- Kingdom: Animalia
- Phylum: Arthropoda
- Class: Insecta
- Order: Hemiptera
- Suborder: Heteroptera
- Family: Gerridae
- Genus: Limnoporus
- Species: L. dissortis

Binomial name
- Limnoporus dissortis (Drake & Harris, 1930)

Synonyms
- Gerris dissortis Drake and Harris, 1930

= Limnoporus dissortis =

Species of true bug

Limnoporus dissortis is a species of water strider in the family Gerridae. It is found in North America.
