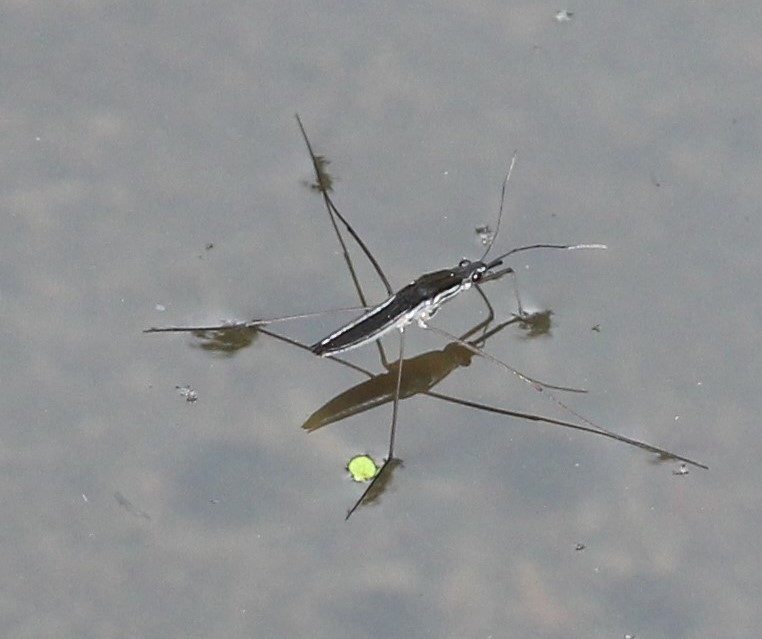

Scientific classification
- Domain: Eukaryota
- Kingdom: Animalia
- Phylum: Arthropoda
- Class: Insecta
- Order: Hemiptera
- Suborder: Heteroptera
- Family: Gerridae
- Genus: Limnoporus
- Species: L. canaliculatus

Binomial name
- Limnoporus canaliculatus (Say, 1832)

Synonyms
- Gerris canaliculatus Say, 1832

= Limnoporus canaliculatus =

Species of true bug

Limnoporus canaliculatus is a species of water strider in the family Gerridae. It is found in North America.
