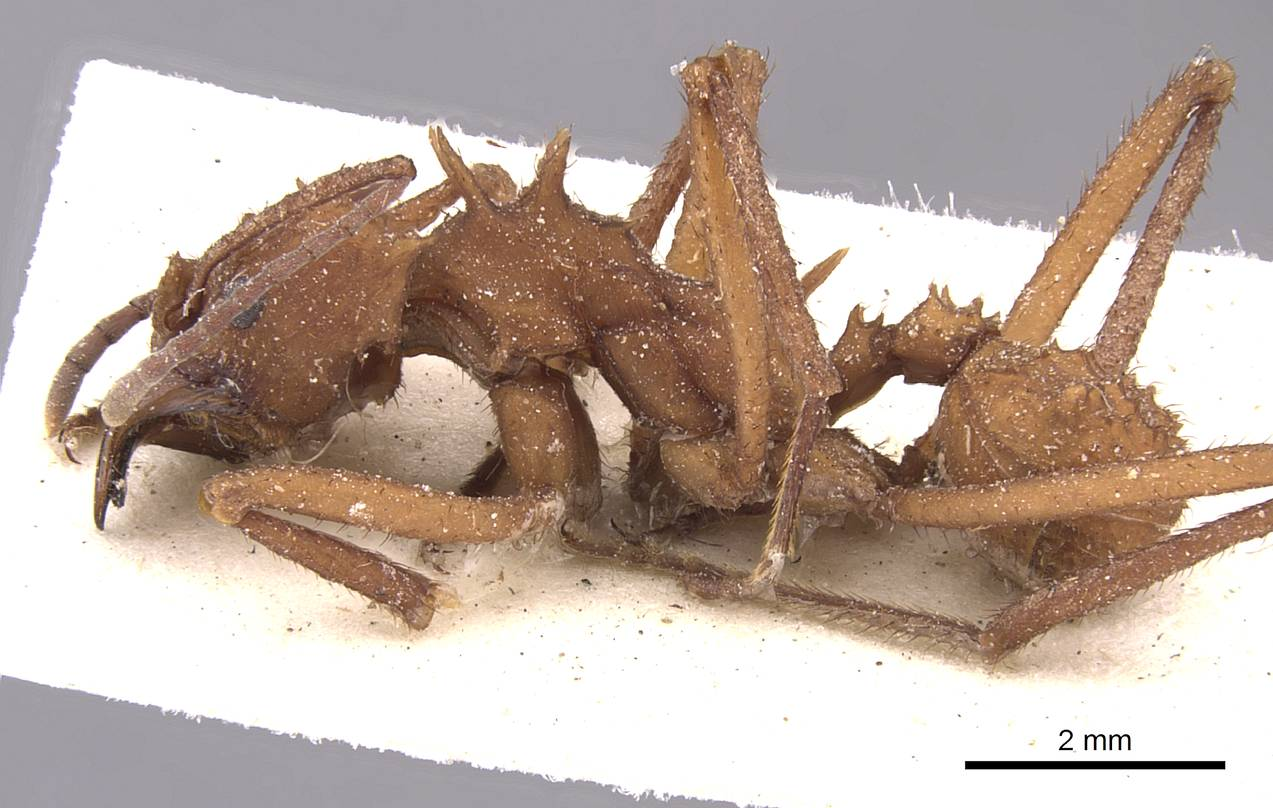

Scientific classification
- Kingdom: Animalia
- Phylum: Arthropoda
- Clade: Pancrustacea
- Class: Insecta
- Order: Hymenoptera
- Family: Formicidae
- Subfamily: Myrmicinae
- Genus: Acromyrmex
- Species: A. echinatior

Binomial name
- Acromyrmex echinatior Forel, 1899

= Acromyrmex echinatior =

Species of ant

Acromyrmex echinatior is a species of New World ants of the subfamily Myrmicinae of the genus Acromyrmex. It is found in the wild naturally from Mexico to Panama.

In Costa Rica, this species prefers open dry habitats such as urban areas around San Jose and seasonally dry habitats of Guanacaste Province.

Queens multiply mate, and colonies are facultatively polygynous. Nonreproductive workers of the colony 'police', that is, selectively destroy worker-laid eggs, but do not attack reproductive workers. Relatedness incentives are the most likely ultimate cause of the evolutionary maintenance of worker–egg policing in A. echinatior.

== See also ==
- List of leafcutter ants
