= List of Halobates species =

This is a list of 47 species in Halobates, a genus of water striders in the family Gerridae.

== Halobates species ==
- Halobates acherontis J.Polhemus, 1982^{g}
- Halobates alluaudi Bergroth, 1893^{g}
- Halobates browni Herring, 1961^{g}
- Halobates bryani Herring, 1961^{g}
- Halobates calyptus Herring, 1961^{g}
- Halobates darwini Herring, 1961^{g}
- Halobates dianae Zettel, 2001^{g}
- Halobates elephanta Andersen & Foster, 1992^{g}
- Halobates esakii Miyamoto, 1967^{g}
- Halobates fijiensis Herring, 1958^{g}
- Halobates flaviventris Eschscholtz, 1822^{g}
- Halobates formidabilis (Distant, 1910)^{g}
- Halobates galatea Herring, 1961^{g}
- Halobates germanus Buchanan White, 1883^{g}
- Halobates hawaiiensis Usinger, 1938^{i c g}
- Halobates hayanus Buchanan White, 1883^{g}
- Halobates herringi J.Polhemus & Cheng, 1982^{g}
- Halobates japonicus Esaki, 1924^{g}
- Halobates katherinae Herring, 1958^{g}
- Halobates kelleni Herring, 1961^{g}
- Halobates lannae Andersen & Weir, 1994^{g}
- Halobates liaoi Zettel, 2005^{g}
- Halobates maculatus Schadow, 1922^{g}
- Halobates mariannarum Esaki, 1924^{g}
- Halobates matsumurai Esaki, 1924^{g}
- Halobates melleus Linnavuori, 1971^{g}
- Halobates micans Eschscholtz, 1822^{i c g b}
- Halobates mjobergi Hale, 1925^{g}
- Halobates murphyi J.Polhemus & D.Polhemus, 1991^{g}
- Halobates nereis Herring, 1961^{g}
- Halobates panope Herring, 1961^{g}
- Halobates peronis Herring, 1961^{g}
- Halobates poseidon Herring, 1961^{g}
- Halobates princeps Buchanan White, 1883^{g}
- Halobates proavus Buchanan White, 1883^{g}
- Halobates regalis Carpenter, 1892^{g}
- Halobates robinsoni Andersen & Weir, 2003^{g}
- Halobates robustus Barber, 1925^{g}
- Halobates salotae Herring, 1961^{g}
- Halobates sericeus Eschscholtz, 1822^{i c g b} (Pacific pelagic water strider)
- Halobates sexualis Distant, 1903^{g}
- Halobates sobrinus Buchanan White, 1883^{g}
- Halobates splendens Witlaczil, 1886^{g}
- Halobates tethys Herring, 1961^{g}
- Halobates trynae Herring, 1964^{g}
- Halobates whiteleggei Skuse, 1891^{g}
- Halobates zephyrus Herring, 1961^{g}

Data sources: i = ITIS, c = Catalogue of Life, g = GBIF, b = Bugguide.net
