= Sculpture (mollusc) =

Feature on the shells of mollusks

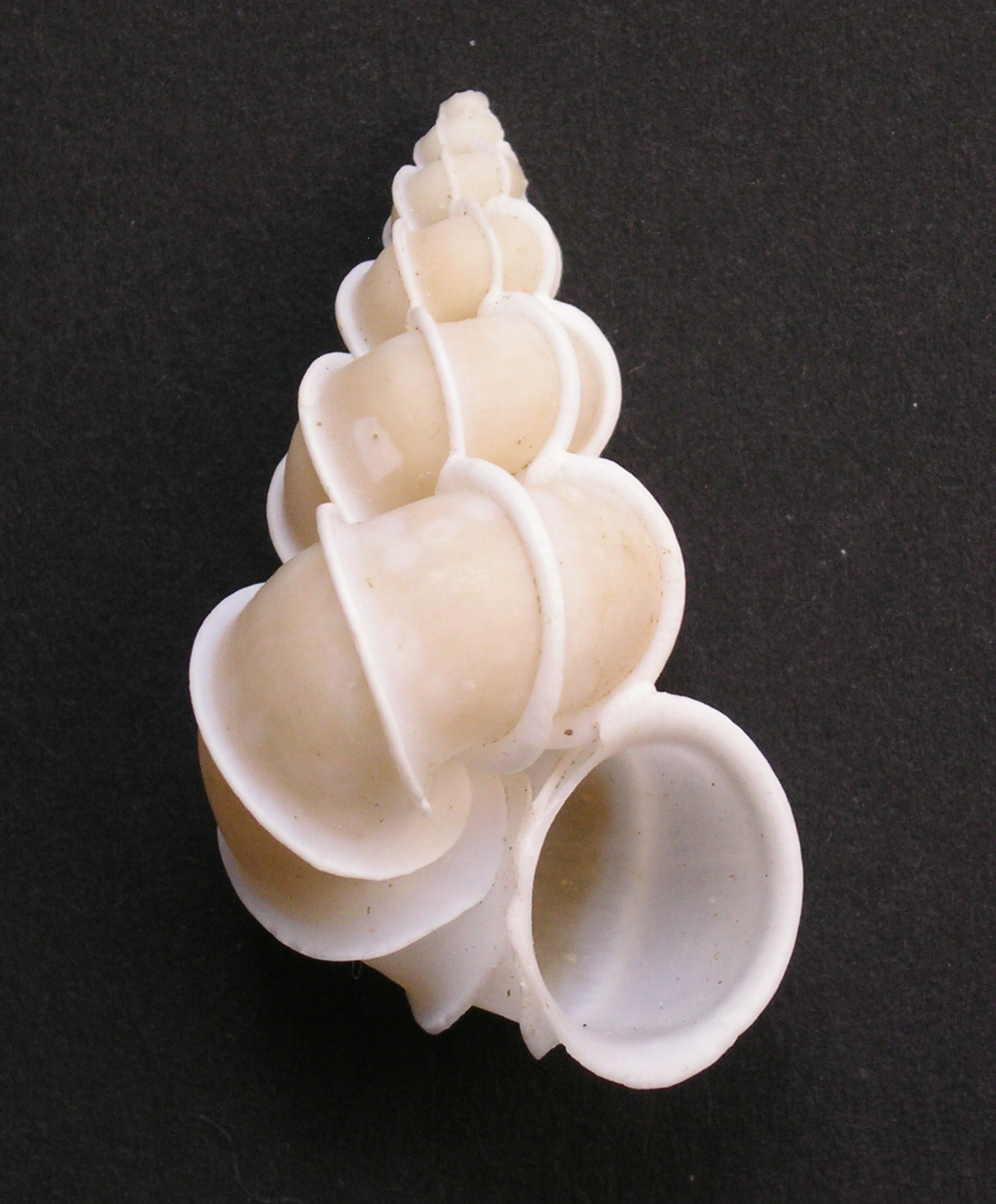
The shell of the sea snail Epitonium scalare has a sculpture of sharp vertical ribs known as "costae"

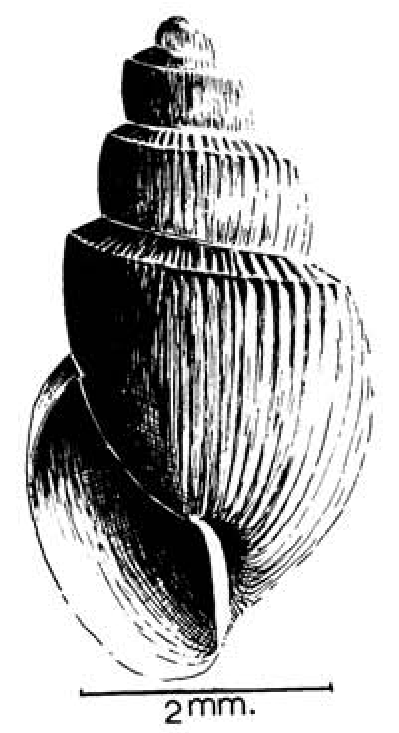
The shell of the freshwater snail Bulinus forskalii has strong transverse ribs which form an angle at the shoulder

Sculpture is a feature of many of the shells of mollusks. It is three-dimensional ornamentation on the outer surface of the shell, as distinct from either the basic shape of the shell itself or the pattern of colouration, if any. Sculpture is a feature found in the shells of gastropods, bivalves, and scaphopods. The word "sculpture" is also applied to surface features of the aptychus of ammonites, and to the outer surface of some calcareous opercula of marine gastropods such as some species in the family Trochidae.

Sculpture can be concave or convex, incised into the surface or raised from it. Sometimes the sculpture has microscopic detailing. The term "sculpture" refers only to the calcareous outer layer of shell, and does not include the proteinaceous periostracum, which is in some cases textured even when the underlying shell surface is smooth.

In many taxa, there is no sculpture on the shell surface at all, apart from the presence of fine growth lines. The sculpture has a protective function because it increases the diameter of the shell, distributing mechanical stress (such as the force of a predator's jaws) across a larger surface area.

== List of terms ==
- Axial sculpture - Sculpture running parallel to the axis of coiling, an imaginary line through the apex of a shell about which the whorls are coiled. These are markings which extend from the summit of the whorls toward the umbilicus. The axial sculpture may be:
  - Vertical, when the markings are in general parallelism with the axis of the shell.
  - Protractive, when the markings slant forward from the preceding suture
  - Retractive, when the markings slant backward from the suture
- Bead - A small hemispherical protuberance resembling a bead, similar to but smaller than a nodule.
- Beaded - resembling rows or strings of beads.
- Cyrtoconoid spire - approaching a cone in shape, but with convex sides.
- Growth line - A fine transverse line marking the growth of the shell.
- Lira, lirate - ornamented with fine thread-like lines or grooves.
- Longitudinal sculpture - Sculpture following the direction of the axis of the shell.
- Nodule - A rounded protuberance on the shell sculpture; larger than a bead.
- Nodose, Nodulose, Nodular - Bearing small rounded protuberances or tubercules.
- Ornament - Can refer to surface sculpture standing out in relief on shell surface; or simply to sculpture as a whole.
- Plait - Folds on the columella.
- Prosocline - with the growth lines leaning forward (adapically) with respect to the direction of the cone.
- Pustule - A very fine knob-like protrusion, smaller than a tubercle.
- Reticulate - Sculpture consisting of a criss-crossing network of riblets, threads, or grooves.
- Rib - A strong ridge on the surface of the shell.
- Riblet - Smaller than a rib, but coarser than a thread.
- Spiral sculpture - Sculpture following the spiral growth of the shell.
- Stria (plural striae) - A shallow incised groove.
- Striate - Ornamented with striae.
- Thread - A very fine riblet.
- Transverse sculpture - Sculpture parallel to the edge of the outer lip of the aperture.
- Tubercle - Elevated knob-like projections or protrusions; larger than a pustule.
- Varicose - Bearing one or more varices.

== See also ==
- Sculpturing — arthropod equivalent
