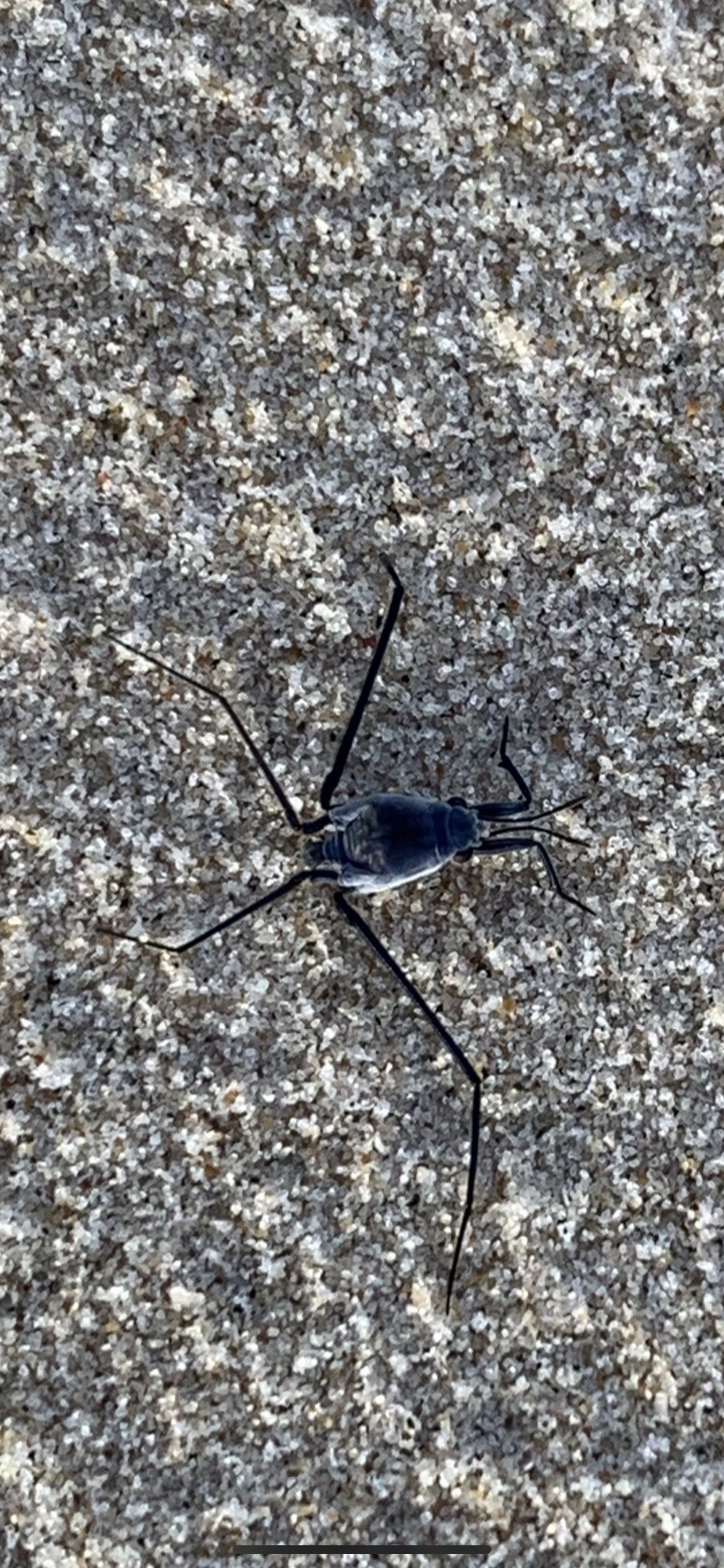
- in situ
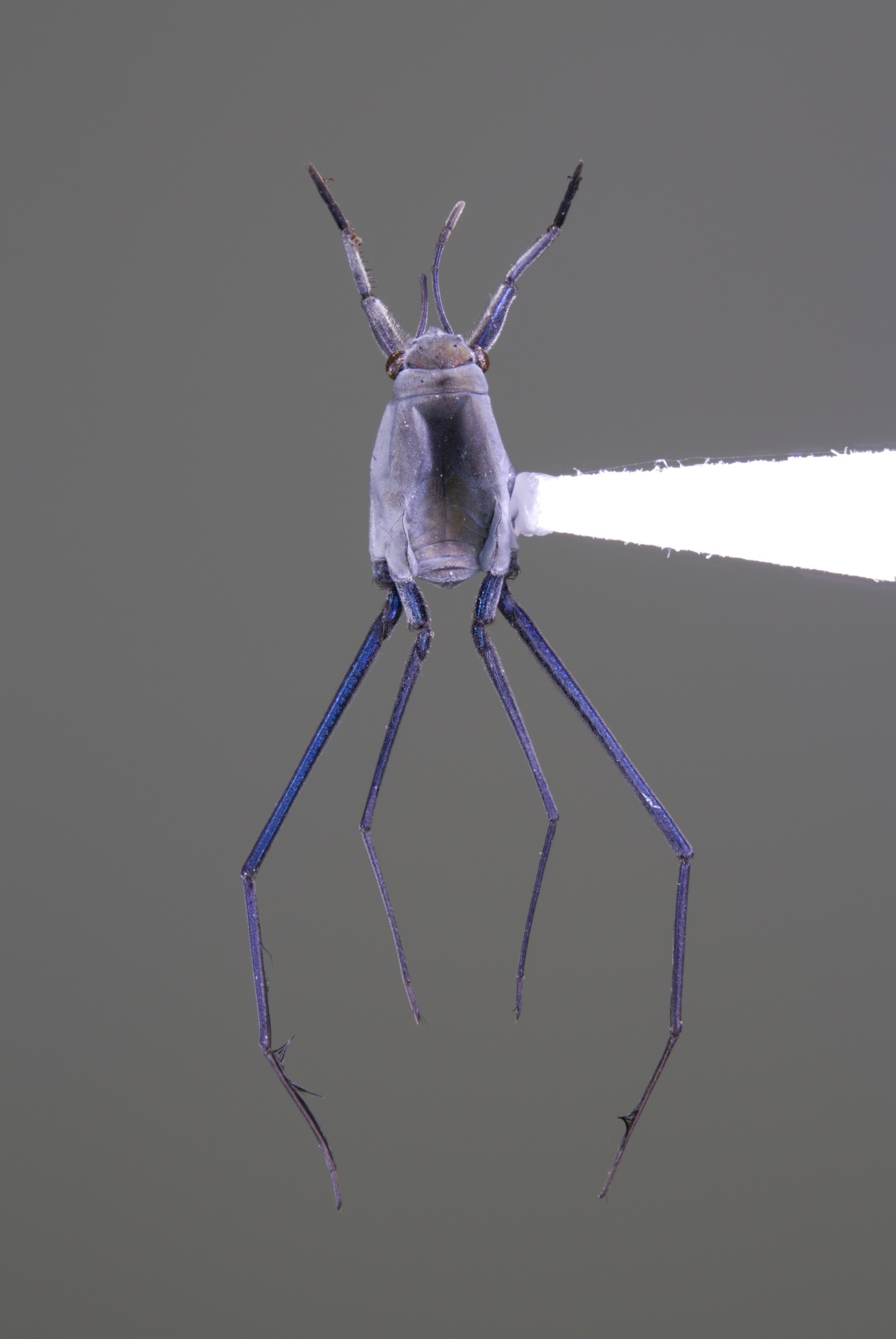
- Specimen

Scientific classification
- Kingdom: Animalia
- Phylum: Arthropoda
- Clade: Pancrustacea
- Class: Insecta
- Order: Hemiptera
- Suborder: Heteroptera
- Family: Gerridae
- Genus: Halobates
- Species: H. micans

Binomial name
- Halobates micans Eschscholtz, 1822

= Halobates micans =

Species of true bug

Halobates micans is a species of sea skater in the family Gerridae. Being a member of Halobates, it is exclusively marine, though unlike the other species that are restricted to the Indian and/or Pacific Oceans, H. micans is circumglobal, occurring offshore in warmer seas around the world; this species is the only Halobates found in the Atlantic Ocean (including the Caribbean) where it ranges from about 40° north to 40° south. Halobates is the only type of insect present in the open ocean, despite at least 14 orders of insect being present in marine environments.

== Description ==
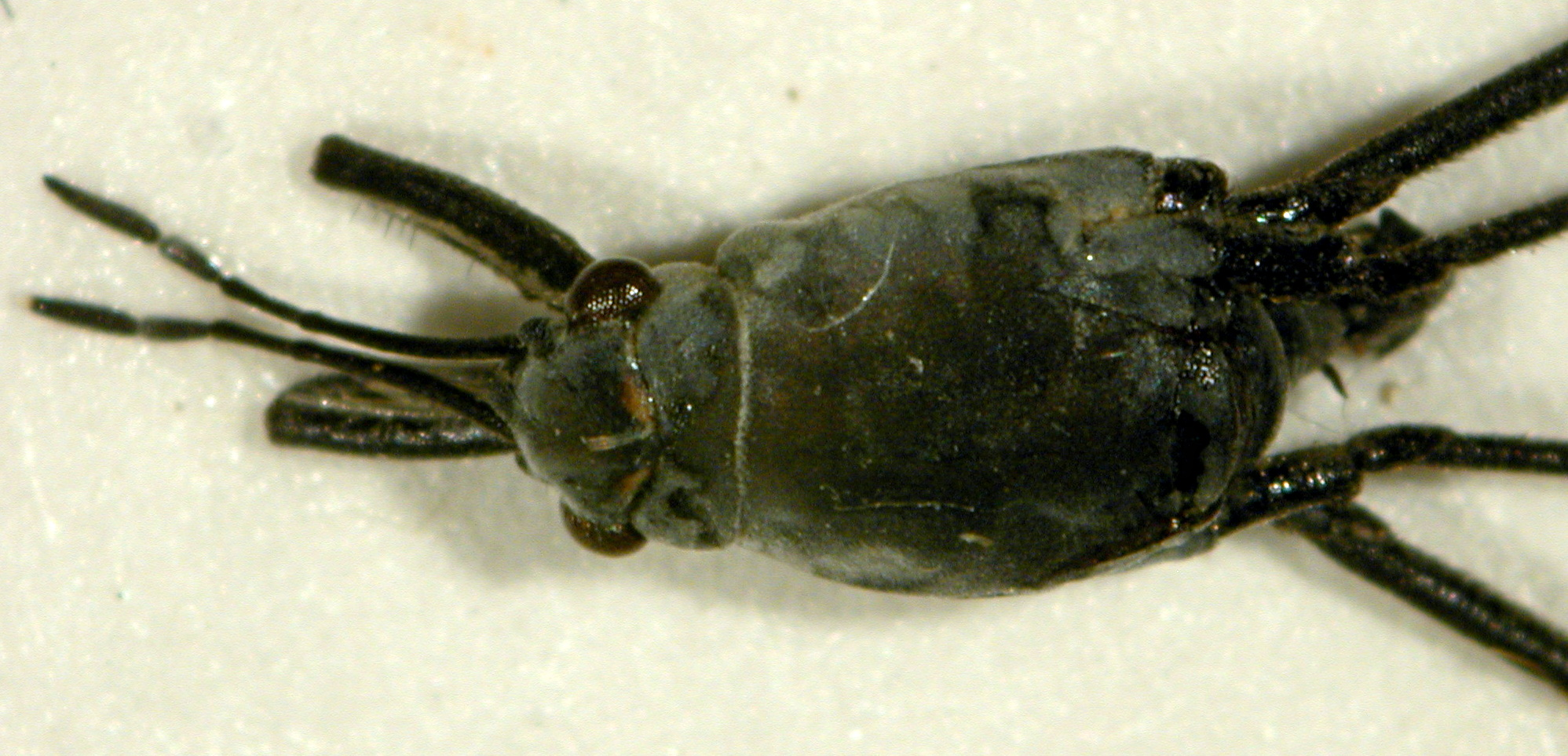
Closeup of the body

As a member of the genus Halobates, it lives out its entire life in marine environments; specifically, it is one of five Halobates species that live on the surface of the open ocean, only occurring near the coast when storms blow them ashore; the other species are H. germanus, H. sericeus, H. sobrinus, and H. splendens. Halobates micans have body lengths (head to abdomen) of around 3.6–4.5 mm (0.14–0.18 in), with males being bigger than females and their appendages extending beyond this.

Members of this genus are wingless at every life-stage; they are flightless, like some inland water striders. The three pairs of legs are used for different tasks; the stout front pair grasps and holds prey items during feeding, the middle longest pair, bearing long hairs on the tibia and first tarsus, provides most of the propulsive force, and the rear pair aids in steering; all three pairs may be used for grooming. The silvery appearance of the body is a result of reflections from air retained by very fine "hairs" which repel water. Their mouthparts are the typical sucking form of hemipterans, with stylets specialized for cutting that then come together to form a "feeding tube". They store energy through lipid stores, of which 92% of this may consist of triglyceride in other pelagic sea skater species, which may also apply to H. micans.

The species of Halobates are difficult to distinguish visually, though it is possible through close comparison of the length of the appendage segments as well as the genital segments of the male bugs.

== Behavior ==
Live specimens maintain a "skating" position with their legs (top header), while the legs of dead animals extend backwards (bottom header). Pelagic Halobates form "patches" where they concentrate in numbers; these aggregations are segregated by age-classes, presumably so that the younger nymphs avoid cannibalization. They apparently do not dive into the water at all for any reason, though are apparently able to recover from 2 hours of submergence at 31.5 °C (88.7 °F) (cooler waters contain more oxygen, and thus allow them to survive for longer). Sea skaters are very agile, being able to skate at speeds of 50–100 cm (20–39 in) per second and jump 10–12 cm (3.9–4.7 in) in height; with their "very well-developed" eyes, they are able to avoid the nets used to sample the pleuston, and likely potential predators; this agility is useful in a region with virtually no cover. This lack of cover also led to UV-absorbent adaptation of their cuticle; as pelagic sea skaters cannot take cover from bright sunlight, their more opaque surfaces must be better adapted to tolerate solar radiation than freshwater Gerrids, which can more easily find shade.

Sea skaters are attracted to artificial light, which may aid in collecting specimens; it is thought that they are attracted to lights because their prey also congregate towards light sources. Pelagic Halobates are not as resistant to freshwater as the coastal species, which may be due to their need to cope with freshwater runoff after inland storms.

=== Feeding ecology ===
Very young nymphs are thought to subsist solely on biofilm that grows on the water's surface, while older nymphs and adults prey on anything they can capture on the open ocean, such as zooplankton and floating insects, and suck out their fluids. Pelagic Halobates apparently prefer struggling prey, in contrast to nearshore species which avoid them. Cannibalism has been documented; older individuals never preyed on their fellows, but exclusively on younger individuals. Relatively large prey items may be shared by a few bugs. Seabirds are the most important predator of sea skaters in general, and remains of this species has been found inside the guts of the bridled tern (Sterna anaethetus). Coastal specimens may be fed upon by songbirds (Dendroica petechia), fish (Sardinops sagax, Mugilidae), and lizards (Microlophus albemarlensis). Pelagic sea skaters were found to accumulate heavy metals.

=== Life cycle ===
The eggs (1 mm long) are laid on flotsam, such as seabird feathers, driftwood, or plastic, but eggs may even be laid on juvenile members of the same species; these are olive when fresh and turn orange after a few days. Development might take up to a month at 20 °C (68 °F), after which the nymph punctures the chorion with a chitinized "egg-burster", and extracts itself from the egg which takes around 3 minutes; eggs hatch together in intervals, which is likely a method to reduce the risk of predation on the vulnerable nymphs. The young are similar in morphology to adults, with the nymphs of the first instar being pale brown instead of dark grey; these reach maturity after 5 moults, with the sexes of immature animals being indistinguishable. Generational length is likely longer than two months. Individuals which were about to molt appeared sluggish and stopped feeding, teneral nymphs are pale-yellow to off-white. The speed of development is likely based on ambient temperature.
