= Ventidius =

Ventidius may refer to:

- Publius Ventidius (fl. 89–38 BC), Roman general, protégé of Julius Caesar
- Ventidius (bug), genus of water striders
