= Ventidius (bug) =

Scientific classification
- Domain: Eukaryota
- Kingdom: Animalia
- Phylum: Arthropoda
- Class: Insecta
- Order: Hemiptera
- Suborder: Heteroptera
- Family: Gerridae
- Subfamily: Halobatinae
- Genus: Ventidius; Distant, 1910

Genus of bugs

Ventidius is a genus of water strider.

== Description ==
Usually found on or near water

== Taxonomy ==
Ventidius contains the following species:

- Ventidius sushmae Gupta, 1981
- Ventidius usingeri Hungerford & Matsuda 1960
