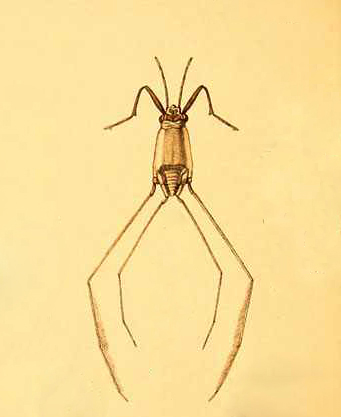

Scientific classification
- Domain: Eukaryota
- Kingdom: Animalia
- Phylum: Arthropoda
- Class: Insecta
- Order: Hemiptera
- Suborder: Heteroptera
- Family: Gerridae
- Genus: Halobates
- Species: H. princeps

Binomial name
- Halobates princeps White, 1883

= Halobates princeps =

Species of insect

Halobates princeps is a species of water strider within the family Gerridae. It has a distribution covering parts of the Indian and Pacific Ocean near areas such as India, Australia, Indonesia, Papua New Guinea, Malaysia and the Philippines.
