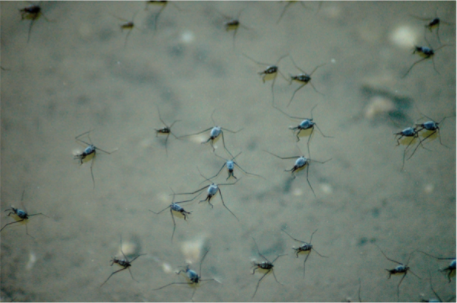
- A group of the coastal Halobates matsumurai at the Kujūku Islands, Japan

Scientific classification
- Kingdom: Animalia
- Phylum: Arthropoda
- Clade: Pancrustacea
- Class: Insecta
- Order: Hemiptera
- Suborder: Heteroptera
- Family: Gerridae
- Subfamily: Halobatinae
- Genus: Halobates; Eschscholtz, 1822

Species
- More than 40, see list

= Halobates =

Halobates Temporal range: Ypresian–Present

Genus of true bugs

Halobates, colloquially the sea skaters or ocean striders, are an insect genus with over 40 species of water striders. Most Halobates species are coastal and typically found in sheltered, coastal marine habitats (a habitat where a few other genera of water striders also live), but five live on the surface of the open ocean and only occur near the coast when storms blow them ashore. These are the only known truly oceanic, offshore insects. They are found in tropical and subtropical marine habitats around the world, with a single species recorded in rivers a few kilometers upstream from the ocean. Halobates are generally very abundant where they are found.

== Discovery ==
They were first collected by Johann Friedrich von Eschscholtz, a doctor who was part of a Russian expedition aboard the Rurik between 1815 and 1818.

A fossil species, H. ruffoi, is known from 45 million year old deposits in Verona, Italy.

== Description ==
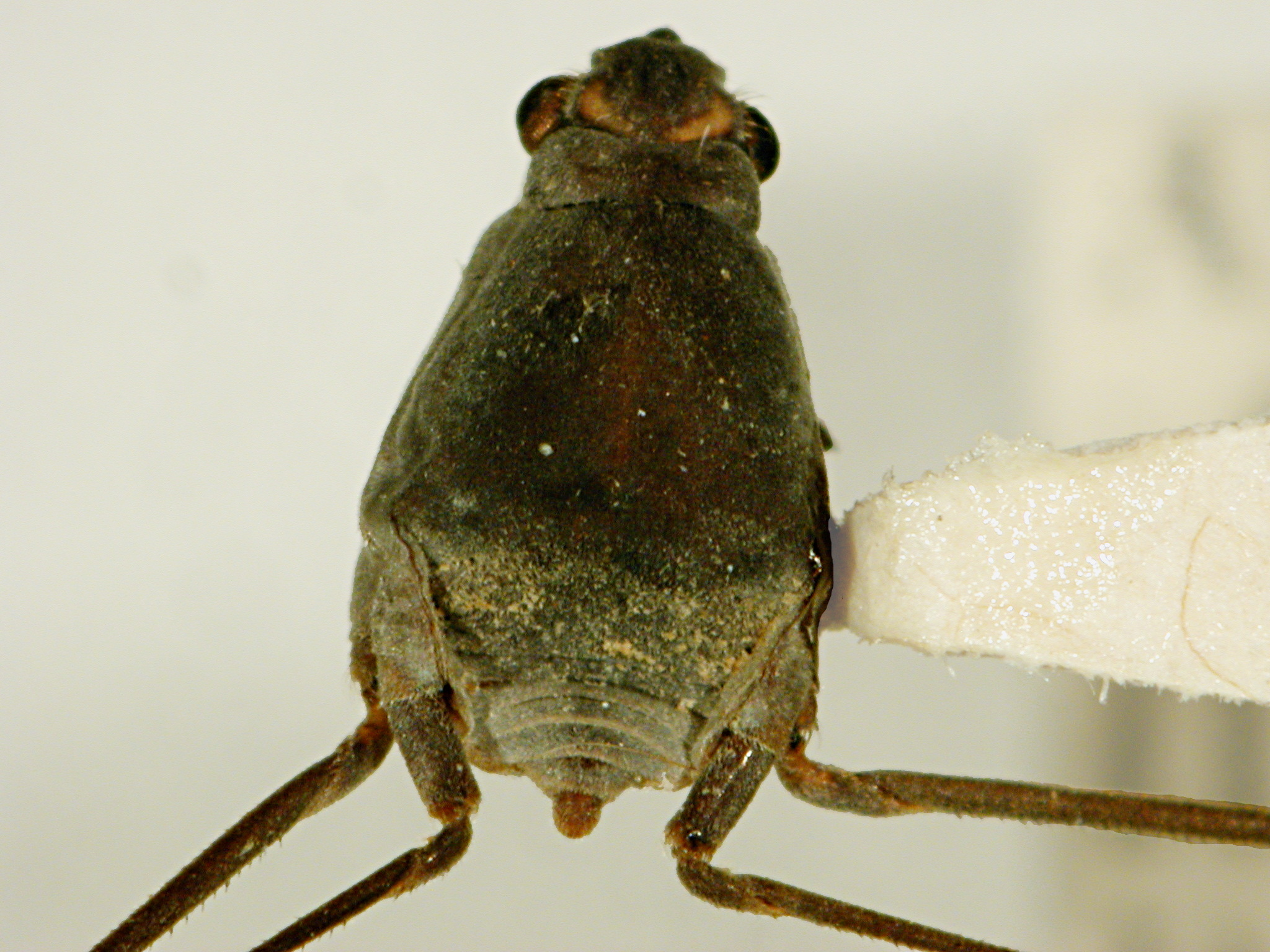
Halobates hayanus (zoological specimen showing the typical death pose)

Halobates are small insects with a body that is up to 6.5 mm (0.26 in) long and 3 mm (0.12 in) broad, and a leg span up to at least 15 mm (0.59 in). They lack wings, have long antennae, short front legs used for catching prey (and, in the male, for holding the female during mating), long middle legs used for propulsion, and somewhat shorter rear legs used for steering. The nymphs resemble miniature versions of the adult. The sexes are quite similar, except that males are thinner than females and have the rear part of the body modified into genitalia, and when gravid the females may have a notably plump abdomen. The various species closely resemble each other in general appearance.

Close relatives of the genus include Austrobates and Asclepios.

== Range and abundance ==
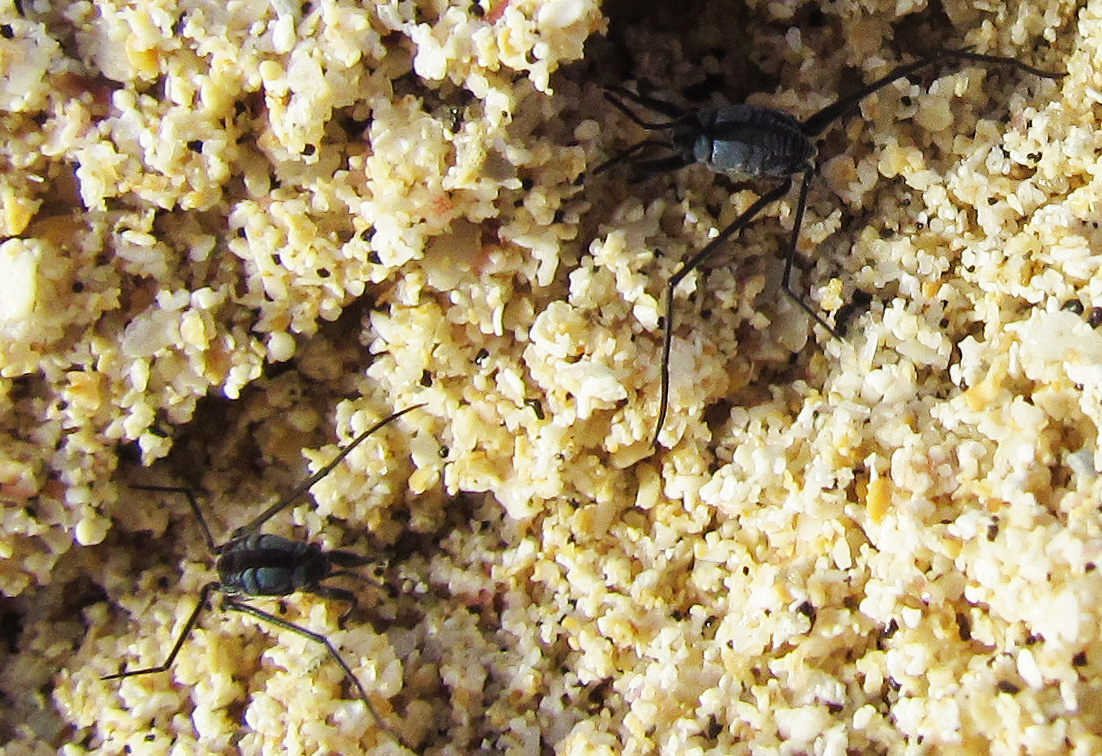
Two Halobates on the shore of Oahu, Hawaii, with upper individual facing left and lower facing right

Halobates are found in tropical and subtropical marine habitats around the world. They generally prefer temperatures of 24–28 °C (75–82 °F), are infrequent below 20 °C (68 °F) and only exceptionally recorded in waters less than 15 °C (59 °F). The coastal species are largely restricted to the Indo-Pacific region, with the exception of H. robustus from the Galápagos Islands. Some of these coastal species have very small ranges, often restricted to a single archipelago, while others are more widespread. They primarily occur near mangrove or other marine plants. A single species, H. acherontis, has been recorded kilometers upstream from the ocean, such as in Daly river, 70 km upstream from its mouth. The absence of coastal species in the Atlantic region may in part be explained by Trochopus. That genus of veliid water striders inhabit coastal mangrove areas in the Atlantic region; the same niche inhabited by coastal Halobates in the Indian and Pacific oceans.

The five offshore, pelagic species are H. micans, H. germanus, H. sericeus, H. splendens and H. sobrinus, of which the last four are found in the Indian and/or Pacific Oceans. H. micans has a circumglobal range, occurring offshore in warmer seas around the world from about 40° north to 40° south, and it is the only one found in the Atlantic Ocean, including the Caribbean.

Their occurrences are generally patchy, but where found they can be very common. During scientific surveys with relatively fast-moving surface nets, they are caught in more than 60% of the tows (less in slow-moving tows, likely because of their ability to avoid them). Studies show that densities locally can be as high as 1 individual per 19 m^{2} (200 ft^{2}) in the oceanic species, and 120 individuals per m² (11 per sq ft) in breeding aggregations of the coastal species.

== Behavior and predators ==
They are predators, with coastal species feeding mainly on land-living insects that have fallen into the water. Less is known about the feeding of the oceanic species, but they appear to mostly eat zooplankton, with other recorded items being floating insects, fish eggs and larvae, and dead jellyfish. Small prey is caught and eaten by a single Halobates, but larger prey such as small fish may be eaten by three or four Halobates at once. Adults may cannibalize their own nymphs, and old nymphs cannibalize young nymphs, but generally they do not eat their own age class. Some species prefer struggling prey over immobile prey, but in other species, it is the other way around.

The feeding behavior of the newly-hatched nymphs is unknown, as aquarium kept individuals refused to eat the various organisms that older captive nymphs and adults will eat (for example, dead fruit flies). This has resulted in speculations that the newly-hatched nymphs might feed on the rich organic film at the ocean's surface.

Halobates may catch aquatic prey just below the surface with their front legs, but do not dive. They use a rowing stroke to propel themselves, with the middle tarsi quickly pressed down and backwards to create a circular surface wave in which the crest can be used to propel a forward thrust. The semicircular wave created is essential to the ability of the water strider to move rapidly since it acts as a counteracting force to push against. As a result, Halobates can move at 1 m (3.3 ft) per second or faster.

The coastal species lay their eggs close to the water surface on rocks, plants, and other structures near the shore, while the oceanic species attach their egg masses on floating objects such as cuttlebone and feathers. Each female lays 1–20 whitish or translucent eggs that each measure about 1 mm (0.04 in) long and half that wide. They may hatch just above or just below the surface.

In recent decades the oceanic species have been documented laying their eggs on floating plastic waste, which potentially may disrupt the marine food chain, as the Halobates (now with access to more surfaces for breeding) may become far more common than usual. In one extreme case, a plastic gallon jug was found to be covered by 15 layers of eggs, equalling about 70,000 in total.

Some species of storm petrel actively feed on Halobates, sometimes splashing the water with their feet to attract or detect sea striders. Other seabirds (especially noddies) and a range of surface-feeding fish will also eat them.

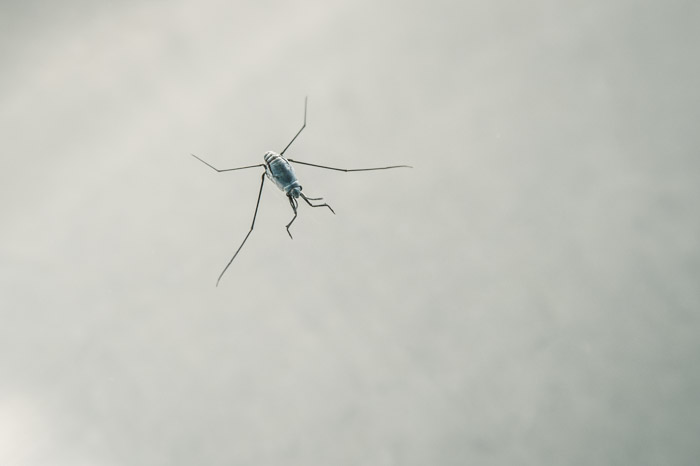
A live specimen of the pelagic species Halobates sericeus

=== Open research questions ===
Apart from understanding how exactly Halobates sp. came to be the only genus of insects to live on the open ocean – in spite of insects making up the majority of all animals – those animals bring up research questions that could have applications in materials sciences.

Incapable of diving or taking shade, Halobates must protect themselves from their constant exposure to solar radiation. Although it is known that the cuticle of Halobates sericeus reflects more than 99.9998 percent of the UV radiation at the 280 nm wavelength, the physical properties that confer this protection are still unknown.
