= Glossary of arthropod cuticle =

This is a glossary of terms used in the description of arthropod cuticle, including that of insects such as ants. For reasons still under investigation, these animals can have surface textures spanning and combining cracks, excavations, imbrications, mealiness, punctures, reticulations, roughness, scratches, spots, wrinkles, and more (generically, 'sculpturing' or 'microsculpture'). As such, hundreds of technical terms have been adapted for use in description of individual specimens from which taxa are defined.

== A ==
a-
wanting or without
ab-
off; away from
aciculate

appearing as if irregularly scratched with a needle
acinose

continuously set with granulations like those on a blackberry
adsperse

marked with closely crowded, small spots
alutaceous

rather pale leather-brown; covered with minute cracks like human skin and leathery in texture
alveolate

honeycombed; with regular, deep, angular cavities (alveoli) separated by thin partitions; furnished with cells or alveoli
areate

furnished with open areas or with areas defined on the surface
areolate

divided into a number of small, irregular, impressed spaces
asperous

rough and uneven
atomarius

with minute dots or points

== C ==
caelate
with superficial plane elevations of varying form
canaliculate

channelled or furrowed; longitudinally grooved (sensu lato); in general body form, long and concave so as to resemble a gutter or channel (sensu stricto)
cancellate

a latticework or grid; a series of enclosed cells or chambers
carinate

keeled; having keels or carinae; with one, or several, but usually few longitudinal narrow raised ribs or ridges
carinulate

with several small, elevated longitudinal ridges or carinae; less prominent than carinate
cariose

corroded; appearing worm-eaten; with cavities or ulcerations
cataphracted

clad in closely set scales
catenate

with longitudinal, connected elevations like links in a chain
catenate
chain-like, with smaller links than catenate
channelled

having deep grooves or channels
cicatrose

a surface having scars with elevated margins like those of small pox
clathrate

latticed; elevated ridges decussing at right angles
colliculate

continuously covered with low, rounded elevations, not as pronounced as acinose
conflected

crowded; thickly clustered
confused

markings with indefinite outlines or run together as lines or spots without definite pattern
connected

scattered; spread irregularly and some distance apart; thin; eg., pile or hairs
consute

with very minute elevations in series, some distance apart, and of a different color from the general surface, which resemble stitching somewhat
coriaceous

leather-like in texture, with minute cracks like human skin
coriarious

leather-like in sculpture; with minute cracks like human skin
corrugated

wrinkled into furrows; with alternate ridges and channels
corticinus

bark-like sculpturing or texture
costate

furnished with longitudinal raised ribs or ridges (costae), much coarser than carinate
costulate
with longitudinal, coarse raised ribs or ridges; much coarser and more extensive than carinulate; less prominent ribs or ridges than costate
crenate

having the margin evenly notched with rounded teeth
crenulate
having the margin finely notched with small, rounded teeth
cristate

with a prominent carina or crest on the upper surface; crested
cristulate

with several, small, crescent-like ridges or crests

== D ==
denudate

without hairs or scales (sensu stricto); without vestiture of any kind (sensu lato)
destitute
lacking or devoid of something specified; being entirely without (used to contrast)
dispersed

with scattered markings or small sculptures

== E ==
e-
without
ecarinate

without or deprived of a keel or a carina (used to contrast carinate)
echinate

thickly set or armed with short, stout spines or prickles; spiny like a hedgehog
echinulate
with very small prickles; minutely echinate
elute
with scarcely distinct markings
embossed

ornamented with raised sculpturing
ex-
out of; proceeding from
exarate

ploughed; sculpted; furrowed; sulcated; an excavated surface in general
excavated

with a scooped out depression; superficially, with a hollowed out area
explicate

unfolded or open; also, without folds or plicae
exsculptate

with irregular, more or less longitudinal depressions, as if carved or scooped out

== F ==
farinaceous

mealy or powdery looking; applied to surfaces or wings
farinose

dotted with many single flour-like spots; mealy
fatiscent

with superficial cracks, crevices, or similar openings
fenestrate

with transparent areas or window-like openings (fenestrae) as in the wings of some Lepidoptera
fissate

with fissures or cracks (sensu lato); divided or cleft (sensu stricto)
fluted

having parallel grooves or flutes; channelled
fossulate

with oblong depressions (fossulae); more elongate or furrow-like than scrobiculate
foveate

pitted; with numerous, regular, depressions or pits (foveae)
foveolate

with small deep pits; finely pitted

== G ==
glabrate
almost glabrous
glabrous

smooth, devoid of pubescence (sensu stricto); devoid of any sculpturing (sensu lato)
goffered

with regular impressions, closely set, and separated by narrow ridges; waffling or honeycombs
granulate

covered with or made up of very small grains or granules; minutely and densely verrucose or minutely farinose

== H ==
hatched

closely marked with numerous short, transverse lines

== I ==
imbricate

partly overlapping and appearing like shingles on a roof or scales on a fish
immaculate

destitute of spots, marks, or sculpturing (sensu lato); destitute of spots or marks (sensu stricto)
impressed

having shallow, depressed areas or markings
impunctate

not punctate or marked with punctures (used to contrast punctate)
inermis

unarmed; without striae, spines, or any other sharp processes
innotate

without markings
institia
striae or furrows of equal width throughout
interstice

a space between two lines, whether striate or punctate
interval

a space between two structures or sculptures
intricate

confused; markings, whether elevated or depressed, so run into each other as to be difficult to see
investitus

unclothed; without scales or hair
irrorate

freckled or speckled; covered with minute spots or granules

== L ==
lacunose

full of hollows or cavities; with scattered and irregular broad, shallow cavities
levigate

a smooth surface, sometimes somewhat shiny or polished; without elevations or depressions
lineate

longitudinally marked with raised or depressed parallel lines; with linear marks
lineolate
finely lineate, longitudinally marked with very fine raised or depressed lines

== M ==
maculate

spotted; with many superficial marks or spots
maculation

the pattern of marks or spots on a surface
micans

shining or twinkling, in part or altogether
munite

a surface armed with spines or other excrescences
murriculate
with a covering of fine, short, sharp, thick excrescences; irregularly scabriculous
mutic

unarmed; lacking processes where such usually occur

== N ==
nitid

shiny or glossy; reflecting light
nodulate

a surface sculpturing of small knots or swellings
notate

marked by spots (sensu stricto); with a series of depressed marks as a sculpture (sensu lato)
nude

naked; devoid of hair, scales or other surface vestiture

== O ==
obscure

dark; not readily seen; not well defined
ordinate

spots or sculpturing arranged in rows or regularly arranged

== P ==
The mandibles of Discothyrea dryad are roughly sculptured with piligerous punctulae

papillate

covered with small, nipple-like surface elevations, often porous at the tip
papillulate

beset with depressions or elevations with a small elevation in the center (a papillule)
perlate

spots or sculpturing arranged in rows or regularly arranged; beaded (sensu lato); bearing relieved, rounded points in series (sensu stricto)
plica

fold
plicate

folded or closed; with folds or plicae; impressed with striae to produce the appearance of having been folded or pleated
politus

polished; smooth, shiny
pollinose

covered with a loose, mealy, often yellow dust like the pollen of flowers; fine meal
porcate

with several parallel, longitudinal ridges with deep, broad sulcations
porose
having pores
prominent

raised or produced above the surface or beyond the margin; standing out in relief; conspicuous by position
protuberance

any excrescence above the surface; a prominence
pruinose

appearing covered with a fine dust or coarse powder, but which cannot be rubbed off; the brightness of the surface somewhat obscured by the appearance of a bloom like that of a plum
pulverulent

powdery or dusty. Also, covered with very minute, powder-like scales
punctate

set with fine, impressed points or punctures appearing as pin-pricks
puncticulate

sparsely punctate with very fine, widely spaced punctures
punctulate

finely punctate; with numerous minute and close set punctures
pustulate

covered with small, blister-like swellings larger than papillae and never with a terminal pore

== R ==
the abdominal segments 5, 6, & 7 of Proceratium bruelheidei are very superficially reticulate

rastrate

covered as if with longitudinal scratches
reticulate

superficially net-like or made up of a network of lines; meshed; netted
rimose

with minute, narrow and nearly parallel excavations (rimae) running into each other; chinky; resembling the cracked bark of a tree
rimulose
minutely rimose; with minute cracks or fissure-like openings with sharp edges
rivose

marked with sinuate furrows, like rivulets, not running in a parallel direction
rivulose
minutely rivose; with very small or fine sinuate furrows, like rivulets, which are not parallel
rorulent

covered with a bloom of fine dust that can be rubbed off
rugose

wrinkled
rugulose

minutely rugose; minutely wrinkled

== S ==
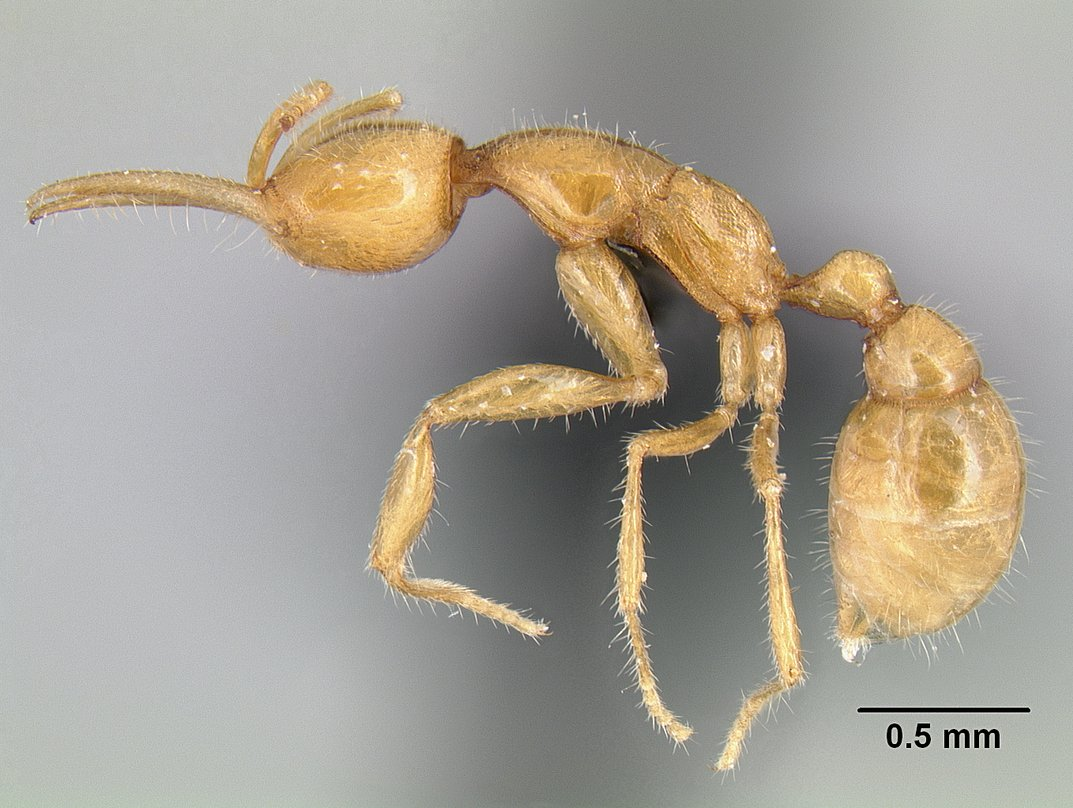
the lateral surfaces of the propodeum of Martialis heureka are faintly striate

salebrose

rough, rugged, or uneven
scabriculous

finely scabrous; with fine and regular short, sharp, wrinkles and/or projections
scabrid
sparsely scabrous
scabrous

rough; irregularly and roughly rugose; possessing short, sharp projections or wrinkles
scarified

sparsely appearing clawed or scratched; furnished with fine, irregular grooves, coarser than aciculate
scrobiculate

uniformly covered with short, oblong or trench-like hollows
sculpture

the markings or pattern of impressions or elevations on a surface
sculptured

ornamented with raised sculpturing; superficially marked with elevations or depressions or both, arranged in some definable manner
scutate

covered with large, flat, scales; having a scutum; shield-shaped; scutiform
scutellate

divided into surfaces like small plates, minutely scutate
serrations

lines arranged in parallel series, either in sculpture or in color, as in the Corixidae of the Heteroptera
shagreened

covered with a closely set roughness, like the rough-surfaced horse leather termed shagreen; like shark leather
sparse

scattered; spread irregularly and some distance apart; thin; eg., pile or hairs
spherulate

provided with one or more rows of minute tubercles
spinose

armed with thorny spines, more elongated than echinate
spinulate

set with numerous small, thorny spines; minutely spinose
squamate

scaly; covered with scales
squarrose

rough with elevations; scurfy; rough with loose scales differing in direction or not parallel in direction
striate

marked with parallel, fine, longitudinal impressed lines or furrows
strigate

having narrow, transverse lines or streaks, either raised or impressed; composed of fine, short lines
strigulate

finely or minutely strigate; with numerous short and fine transverse lines, either raised or impressed
striolate

minutely or finely striate; with numerous parallel and very fine longitudinal impressed lines or furrows
sub-
under, slightly less than, or not quite so
sulcate

deeply furrowed or grooved

== T ==
taeniate
with broad, longitudinal bands or ribbon-like markings (sensu lato); shaped like a tapeworm (sensu stricto)
tesselate

made up of squares like a chess board, either in sculpturing or in color
torose

superficially swelling in knots, knobs, or protuberances; knobby (sensu lato); in general form, swollen or with a knobby or knotted shape (sensu stricto)
torulose

minutely torose; with numerous small knobs or knots (sensu lato)
tuberculate

covered or furnished with rounded, projecting lobes; more projecting than granulate, papillate, or pustulate

== U ==
undose

with undulating, broad, nearly parallel depressions running more or less into each other; wavy, resembling ripple-marks on a sandy beach

== V ==
variolate

pitted as if by smallpox; full of irregular indentations (varioles)
venose
furnished with veins or vein-like marking; of or pertaining to veins
vermicular

worm-shaped or worm-like in general body form
vermiculate

with superficial, tortuous markings resembling the tracks of a worm
verrucose

covered with irregularly shaped lobes or wart-like protuberances
vittate

striped; longitudinally striped or plaited

== See also ==
- Arthropod exoskeleton – Part of arthropods
- Glossary of entomology terms
- Glossary of scientific naming
- List of Latin and Greek words commonly used in systematic names – List of terms used in biology
- Ultrastructure – Detail hidden to optical microscopes
