= Halobatinae =

Scientific classification
- Domain: Eukaryota
- Kingdom: Animalia
- Phylum: Arthropoda
- Class: Insecta
- Order: Hemiptera
- Suborder: Heteroptera
- Family: Gerridae
- Subfamily: Halobatinae; Bianchi, 1896

Subfamily of true bugs

Halobatinae is a subfamily of water strider.

== Tribes and selected genera ==
- Halobatini
- Metrocorini
