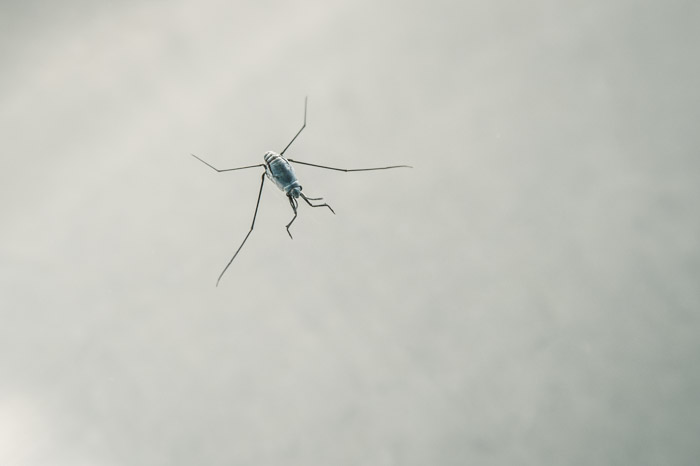

Scientific classification
- Kingdom: Animalia
- Phylum: Arthropoda
- Class: Insecta
- Order: Hemiptera
- Suborder: Heteroptera
- Family: Gerridae
- Genus: Halobates
- Species: H. sericeus

Binomial name
- Halobates sericeus Eschscholtz, 1822

= Halobates sericeus =

Species of true bug

Halobates sericeus, the Pacific pelagic water strider, is a species of water strider in the family Gerridae. It is found in Australia, the East Pacific, Indo-West Pacific, North America, Oceania, and temperate Asia.
