= Arthropod exoskeleton =

Part of arthropods

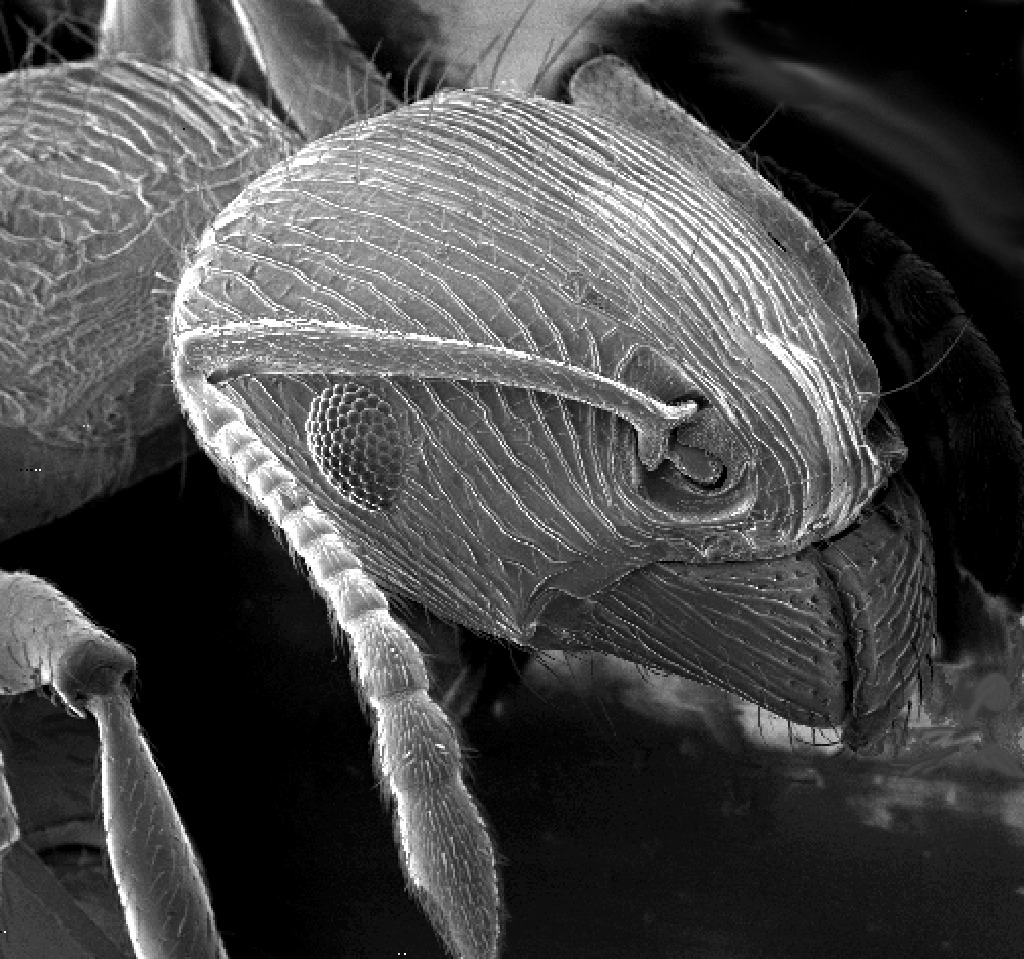
The head of an ant: Chitin reinforced with sclerotisation

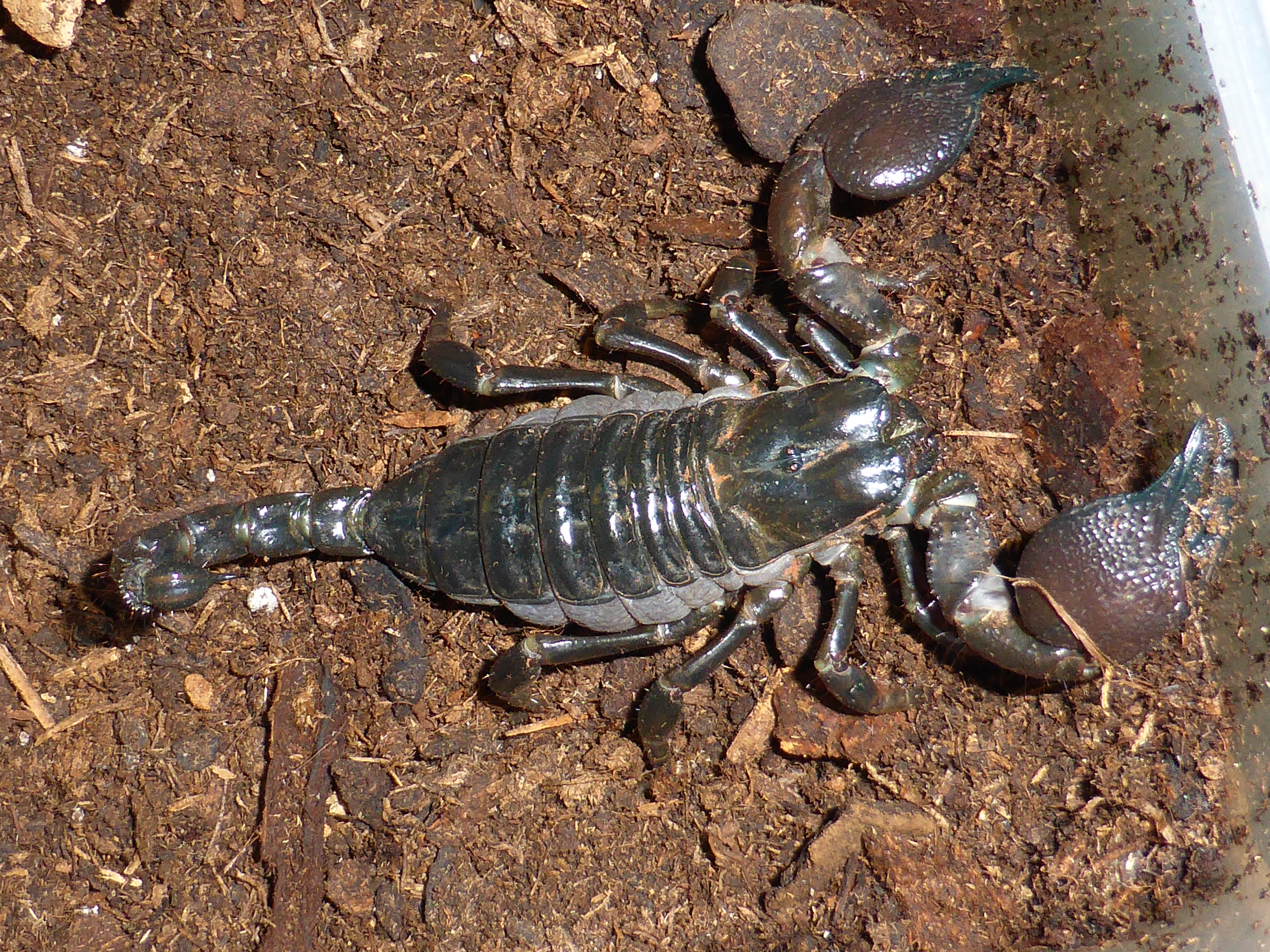
This female Pandinus scorpion has heavily sclerotised chelae, tail and dorsum, but has flexible lateral areas to allow for expansion when gravid

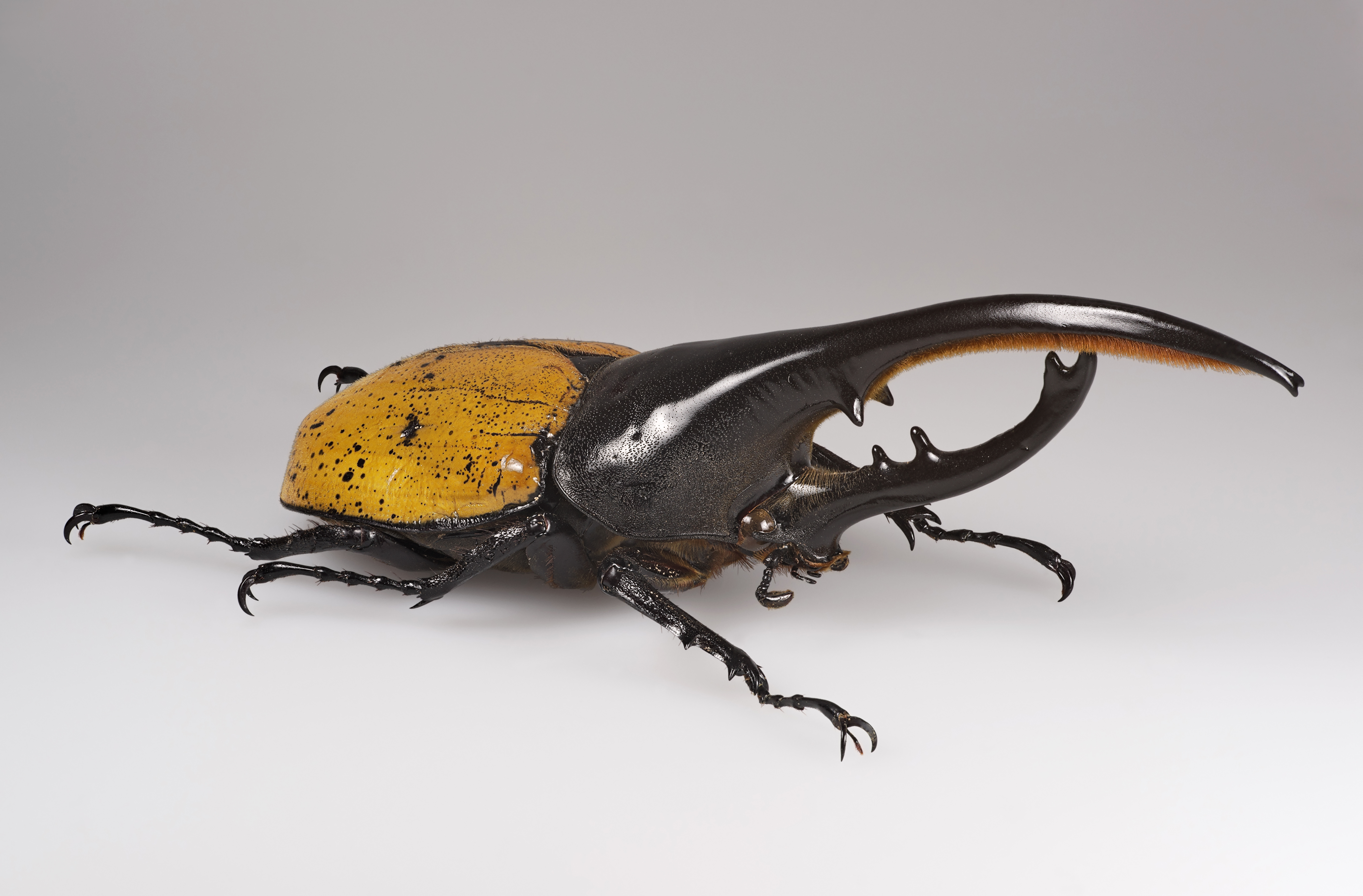
The cuticles of some armoured beetles are rigidly sclerotised

Arthropods are covered with a tough, resilient integument, cuticle or exoskeleton of chitin. Generally the exoskeleton will have thickened areas in which the chitin is reinforced or stiffened by materials such as minerals or hardened proteins. This happens in parts of the body where there is a need for rigidity or elasticity. Typically the mineral crystals, mainly calcium carbonate, are deposited among the chitin and protein molecules in a process called biomineralization. The crystals and fibres interpenetrate and reinforce each other, the minerals supplying the hardness and resistance to compression, while the chitin supplies the tensile strength. Biomineralization occurs mainly in crustaceans. In insects and arachnids, the main reinforcing materials are various proteins hardened by linking the fibres in processes called sclerotisation and the hardened proteins are called sclerotin. The dorsal tergum, ventral sternum, and the lateral pleura form the hardened plates or sclerites of a typical body segment.

In either case, in contrast to the carapace of a tortoise or the cranium of a vertebrate, the exoskeleton has little ability to grow or change its form once it has matured. Except in special cases, whenever the animal needs to grow, it moults, shedding the old skin after growing a new skin from beneath.

== Microscopic structure ==
A: Cuticle and epidermis; B: Epicuticle detail . 1: Epicuticle; 1a: Cement layer; 1b: Wax layer; 1c: Outer epicuticle; 1d: Inner epicuticle. 2: Exocuticle; 3: Endocuticle; 2+3: Procuticle; 4: Epidermis; 5: Basement membrane; 6: epidermal cell; 6a: Pore canal; 7: Glandular cell; 8: Trichogen cell; 9: Tormogen cell; 10: Nerve; 11: Sensilia; 12: Hair; 13: Gland opening.

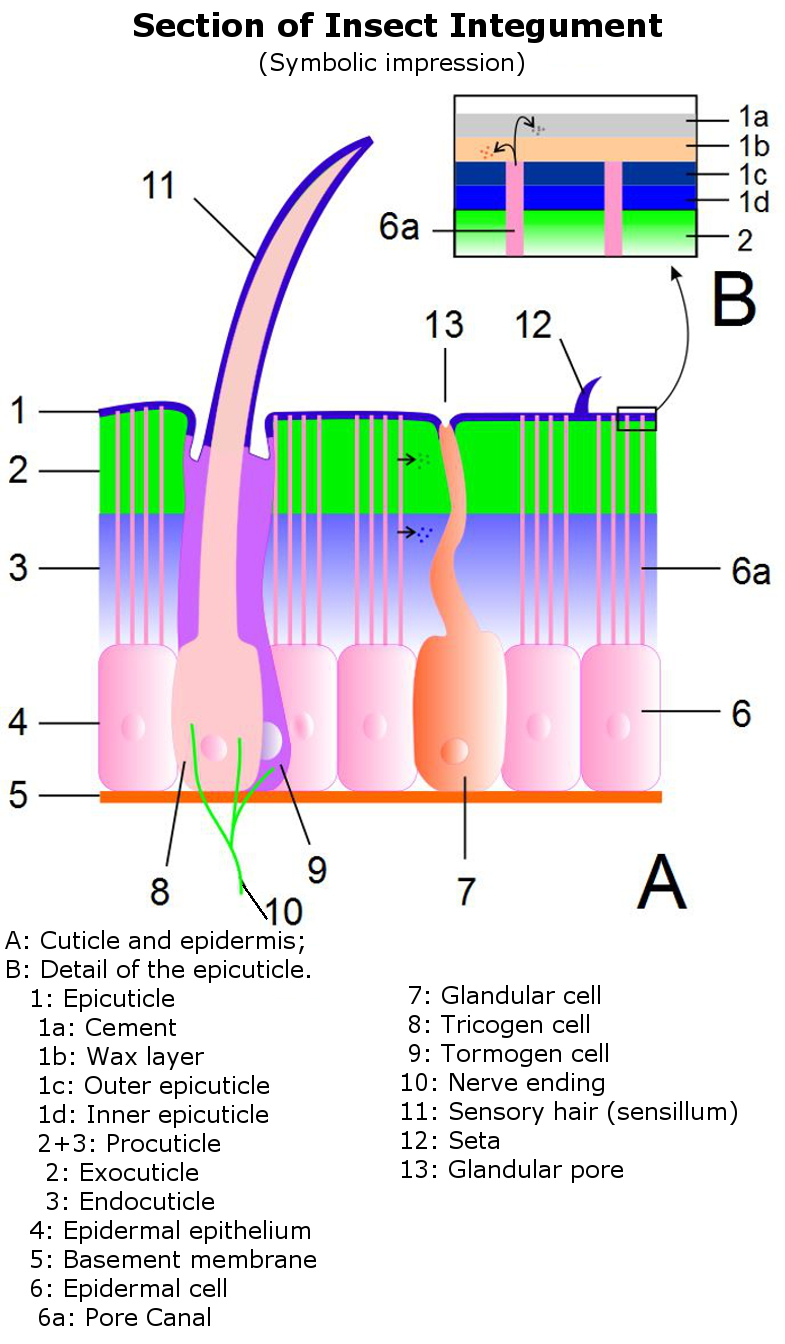

Time series photos of a Tibicen Dog Day Cicada moulting in Ohio USA.

A typical arthropod exoskeleton is a multi-layered structure with four functional regions: epicuticle, procuticle, epidermis and basement membrane. Of these, the epicuticle is a multi-layered external barrier that, especially in terrestrial arthropods, acts as a barrier against desiccation. The strength of the exoskeleton is provided by the underlying procuticle, which is in turn secreted by the epithelial cells in the epidermis, which begins as a tough, flexible layer of chitin. Arthropod cuticle is a biological composite material, consisting of two main portions: fibrous chains of alpha-chitin within a matrix of silk-like and globular proteins, of which the best-known is the rubbery protein called resilin. The relative abundance of these two main components varies from approximately 50/50 to 80/20 chitin protein, with softer parts of the exoskeleton having a higher proportion of chitin.

The cuticle is soft when first secreted, but it soon hardens as required, in a process of sclerotization. The process is poorly understood, but it involves forms of tanning in which phenolic chemicals crosslink protein molecules or anchor them to surrounding molecules such as chitins. Part of the effect is to make the tanned material hydrophobic. By varying the types of interaction between the proteins and chitins, the insect metabolism produces regions of exoskeleton that differ in their wet and dry behaviour, their colour and their mechanical properties.

The chitinous procuticle is formed of an outer exocuticle and the inner endocuticle, and between the exocuticle and endocuticle there may be another layer called mesocuticle which has distinctive staining properties. The tough and flexible endocuticle is a laminated structure of layers of interwoven fibrous chitin and protein molecules, while the exocuticle is the layer in which any major thickening, armouring and biomineralization occurs. Biomineralization with calcite is particularly common in Crustacea, whereas sclerotization particularly occurs in insects. The exocuticle is greatly reduced in many soft-bodied insects, especially in the larval stages such as caterpillars and the larvae of parasitoidal Hymenoptera.

In addition to the chitinous-proteinaceous composite of the cuticle, many crustaceans, some myriapods and the extinct trilobites further impregnate the cuticle with mineral salts, above all calcium carbonate, which can make up to 40% of the cuticle. The armoured product commonly has great mechanical strength.

== Mechanical properties ==
The two layers of the cuticle have different properties. The outer layer is where most of the thickening, biomineralization and sclerotisation takes place, and its material tends to be strong under compressive stresses, though weaker under tension. When a rigid region fails under stress, it does so by cracking. The inner layer is not as highly sclerotised, and is correspondingly softer but tougher; it resists tensile stresses but is liable to failure under compression.

This combination is especially effective in resisting predation, as predators tend to exert compression on the outer layer, and tension on the inner.

Its degree of sclerotisation or mineralisation determines how the cuticle responds to deformation. Below a certain degree of deformation changes of shape or dimension of the cuticle are elastic and the original shape returns after the stress is removed. Beyond that level of deformation, non-reversible, plastic deformation occurs until finally the cuticle cracks or splits. Generally, the less sclerotised the cuticle, the greater the deformation required to damage the cuticle irreversibly. On the other hand, the more heavily the cuticle is armoured, the greater the stress required to deform it harmfully.

== Segmentation ==
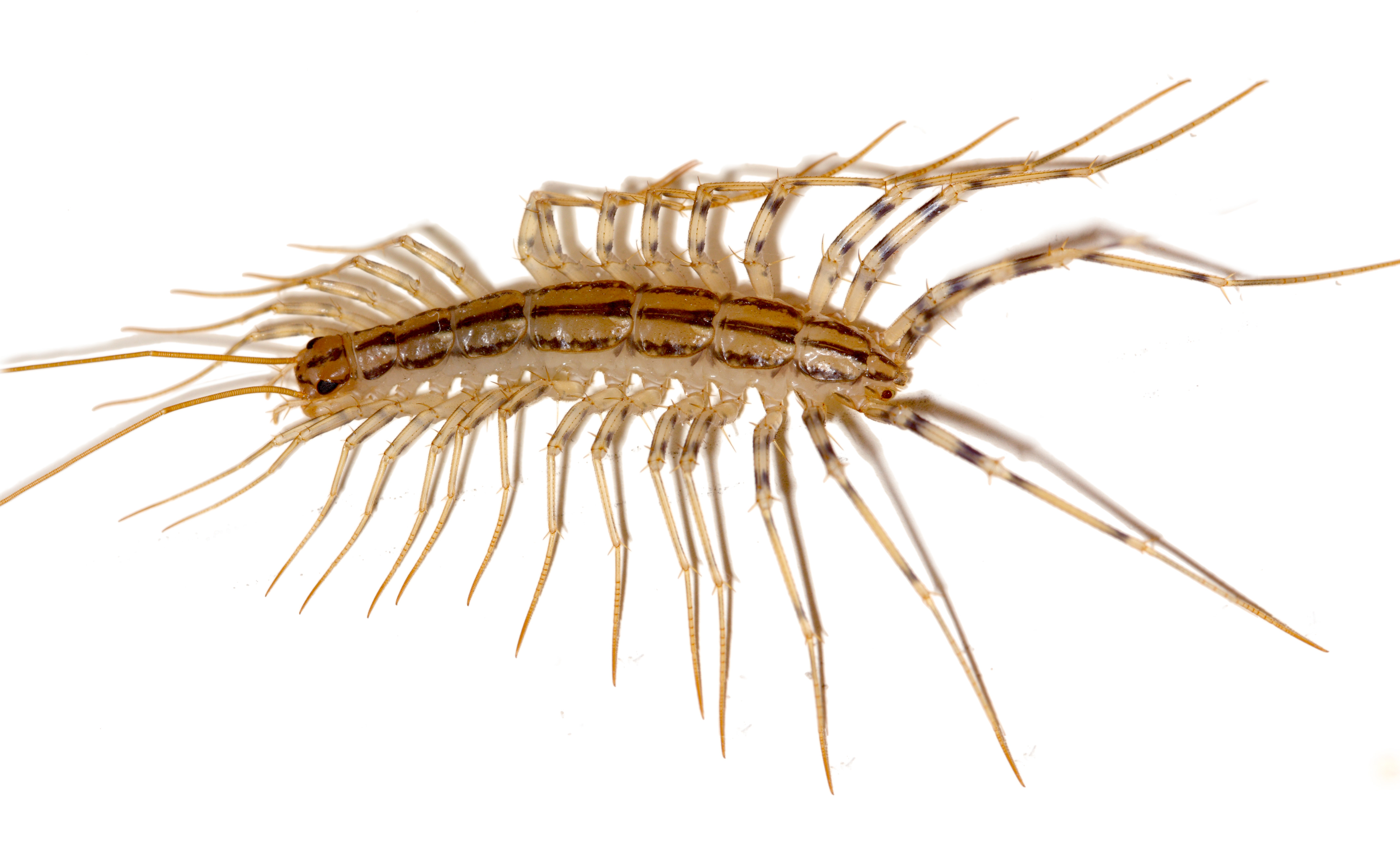
The house centipede Scutigera coleoptrata has rigid sclerites on each body segment. Supple chitin holds the sclerites together and connects the segments flexibly. Similar chitin connects the joints in the legs. Sclerotised tubular leg segments house the leg muscles, their nerves and attachments, leaving room for the passage of blood to and from the hemocoel

Hardened plates in the exoskeleton are called sclerites. Sclerites may be simple protective armour, but also may form mechanical components of the exoskeleton, such as in the legs, joints, fins or wings. In the typical body segment of an insect or many other Arthropoda, there are four principal regions. The dorsal region is the tergum; if the tergum bears any sclerites, those are called tergites. The ventral region is called the sternum, which commonly bears sternites. The two lateral regions are called the pleura (singular pleurum) and any sclerites they bear are called pleurites.

The arthropod exoskeleton is divided into different functional units, each comprising a series of grouped segments; such a group is called a tagma, and the tagmata are adapted to different functions in a given arthropod body. For example, tagmata of insects include the head, which is a fused capsule, the thorax as nearly a fixed capsule, and the abdomen usually divided into a series of articulating segments. Each segment has sclerites according to its requirements for external rigidity; for example, in the larva of some flies, there are none at all and the exoskeleton is effectively all membranous; the abdomen of an adult fly is covered with light sclerites connected by joints of membranous cuticle. In some beetles most of the joints are so tightly connected, that the body is practically in an armoured, rigid box. However, in most Arthropoda the bodily tagmata are so connected and jointed with flexible cuticle and muscles that they have at least some freedom of movement, and many such animals, such as the Chilopoda or the larvae of mosquitoes are very mobile indeed. In addition, the limbs of arthropods are jointed, so characteristically that the very name "Arthropoda" literally means "jointed legs" in reflection of the fact. The internal surface of the exoskeleton is often infolded, forming a set of structures called apodemes that serve for the attachment of muscles, and functionally amounting to endoskeletal components. They are highly complex in some groups, particularly in Crustacea.

Within entomology, the term glabrous is used to refer to those parts of an insect's body lacking in setae (bristles) or scales.

== Chemical composition ==
Chemically, chitin is a long-chain polymer of a N-acetylglucosamine, which is a derivative of glucose. The polymer bonds between the glucose units are β(1→4) links, the same as in cellulose.

In its unmodified form, chitin is translucent, pliable, resilient and tough. In arthropods and other organisms however, it generally is a component of a complex matrix of materials. It practically always is associated with protein molecules that often are in a more or less sclerotised state, stiffened or hardened by cross-linking and by linkage to other molecules in the matrix. In some groups of animals, most conspicuously the Crustacea, the matrix is greatly enriched with, or even dominated by, hard minerals, usually calcite or similar carbonates that form much of the exoskeleton. In some organisms the mineral content may exceed 95%. The role of the chitin and proteins in such structures is more than just holding the crystals together; the crystal structure itself is so affected as to prevent the propagation of cracks under stress, leading to remarkable strength. The process of formation of such mineral-rich matrices is called biomineralization.

The difference between the unmodified and modified forms of chitinous arthropodan exoskeletons can be seen by comparing the body wall of say a bee larva, in which modification is minimal, to any armoured species of beetle, or the fangs of a spider. In both those examples there is heavy modification by sclerotisation. Again, contrasting strongly with both unmodified organic material such as largely pure chitin, and with sclerotised chitin and proteins, consider the integument of a heavily armoured crab, in which there is a very high degree of modification by biomineralization.

== Moulting ==
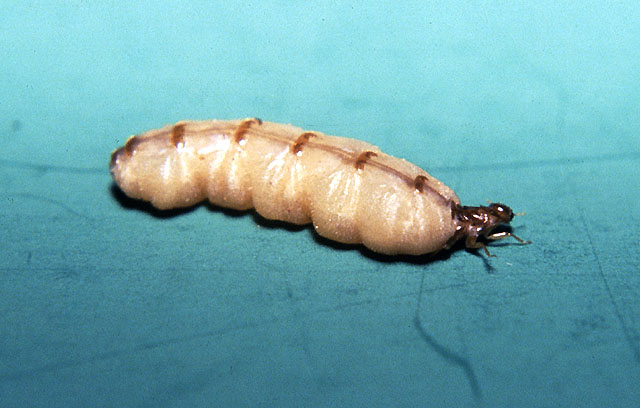
Mature queen of a termite colony, showing how the unsclerotised cuticle stretches between the dark sclerites that failed to stretch as the abdomen grew to accommodate her ovaries

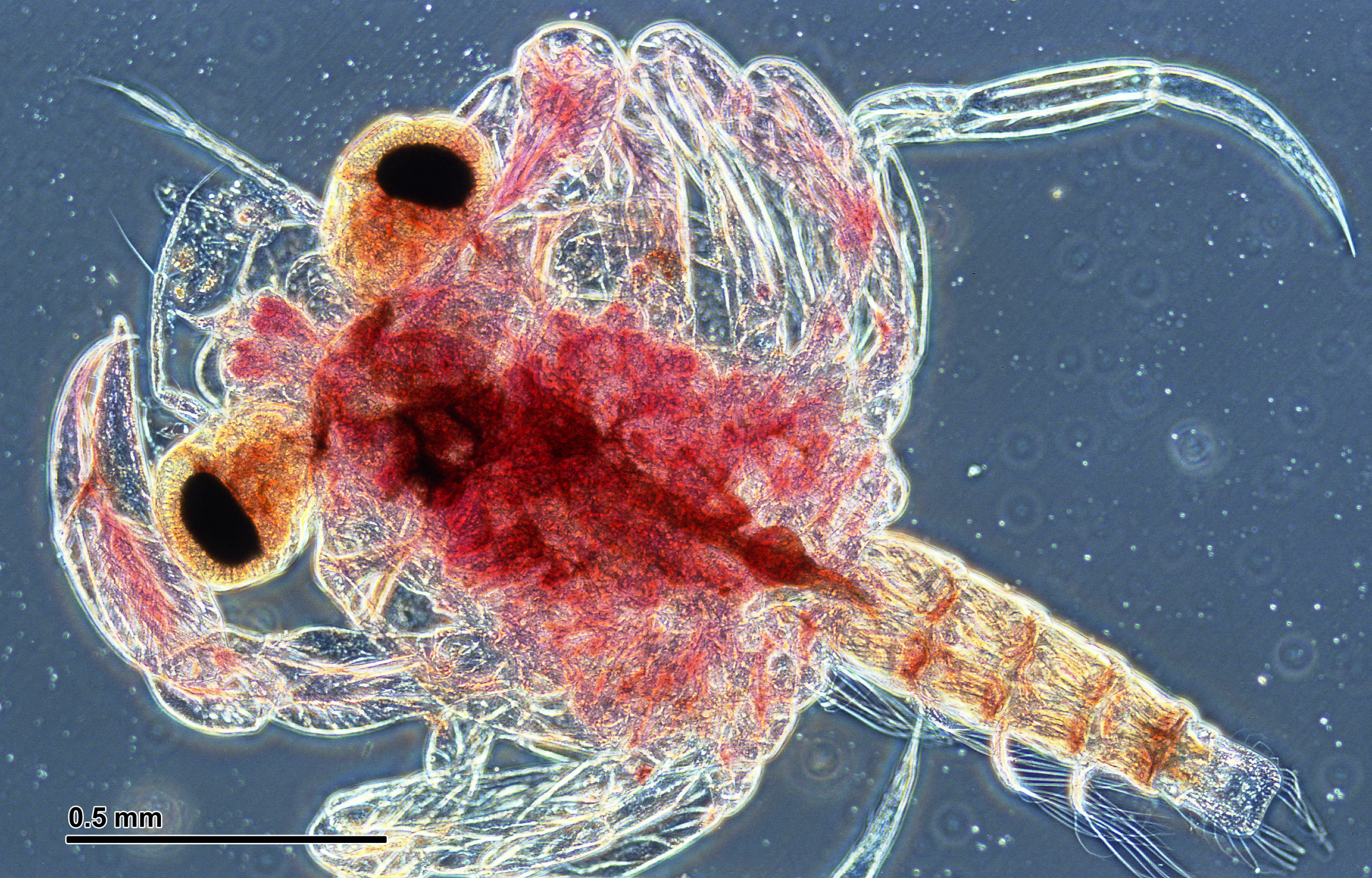
Crab larva barely recognisable as a crab, radically changes its form when it undergoes ecdysis as it matures

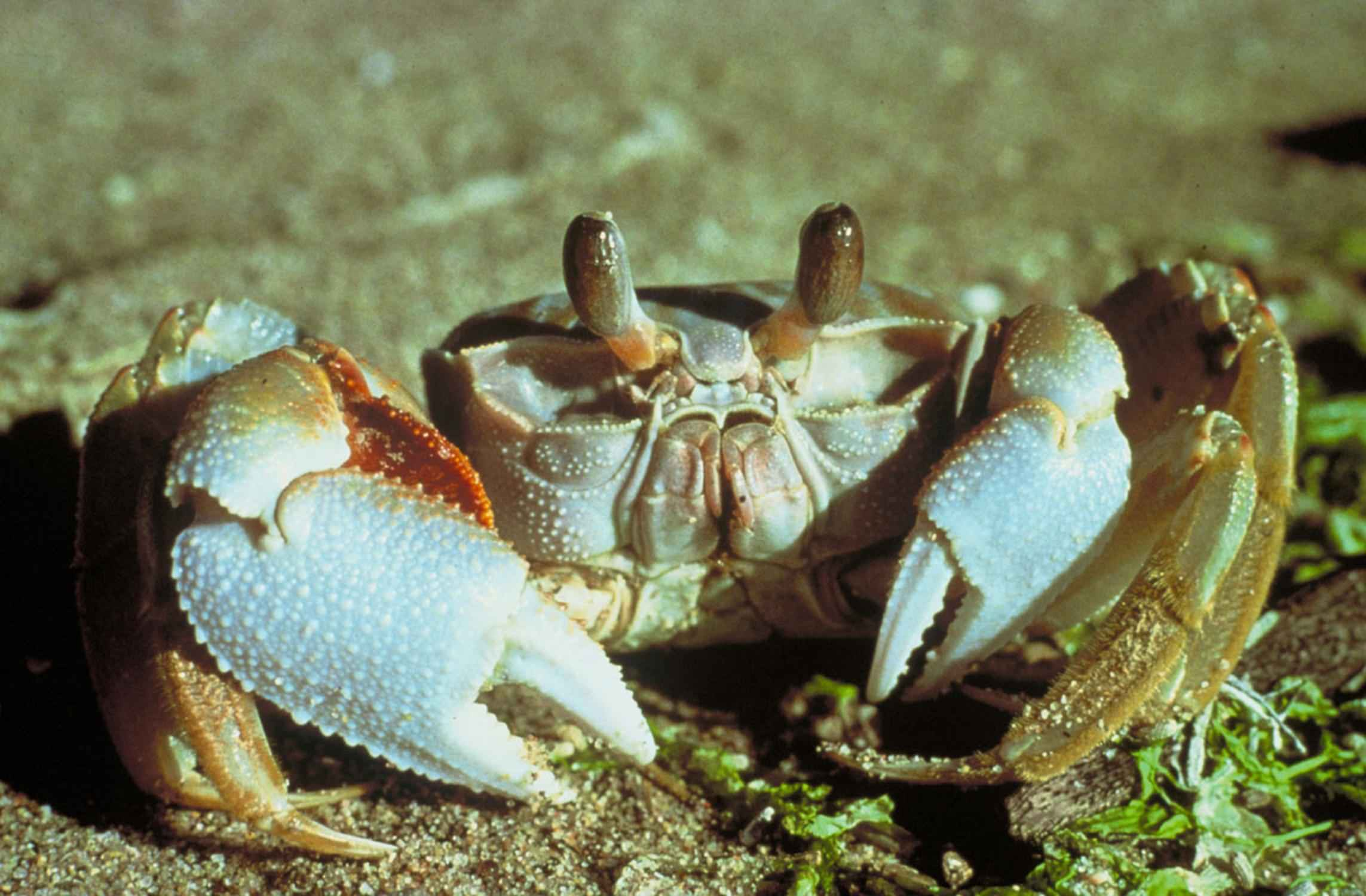
Ghost crab, showing a variety of integument types in its exoskeleton, with transparent biomineralization over the eyes, strong biomineralization over the pincers, and tough chitin fabric in the joints and the bristles on the legs

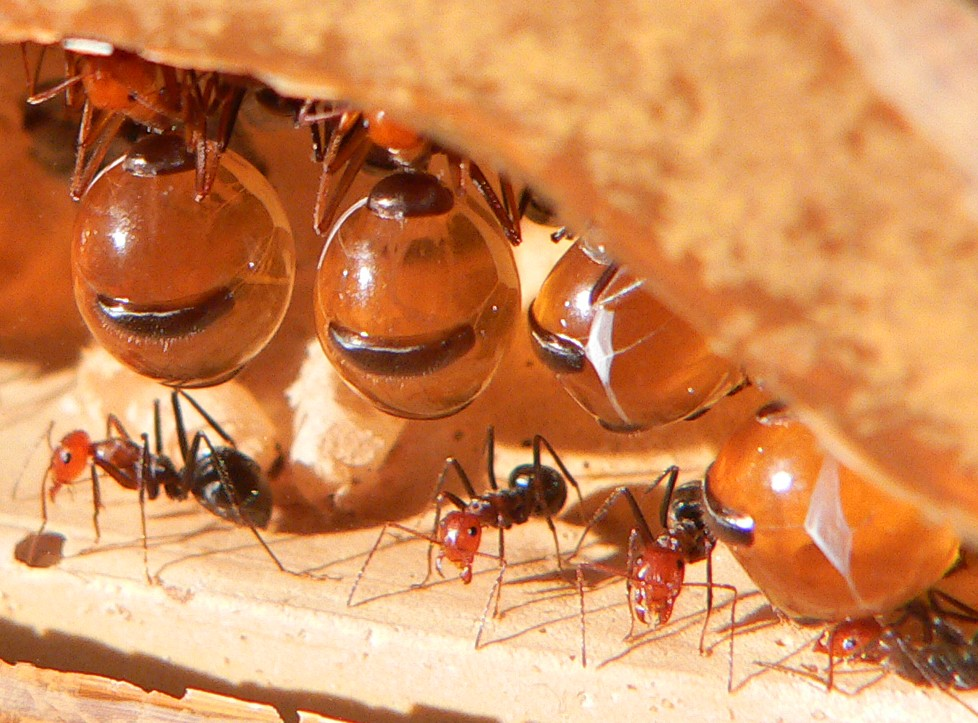
In honeypot ant repletes, the abdomens of the workers that hold the sugar solution grow vastly, but only the unsclerotised cuticle can stretch, leaving the unstretched sclerites as dark islands on the clear abdomen

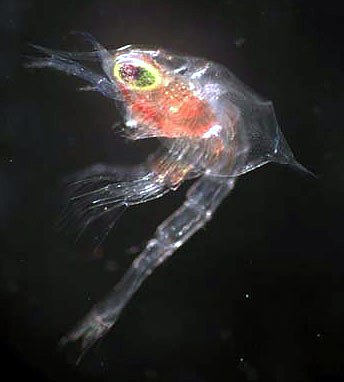
This Zoea-stage larva is hardly recognisable as a crab, but each time it sheds its cuticle it remodels itself, eventually taking on its final crab form

The chemical and physical nature of the arthropod exoskeleton limits its ability to stretch or change shape as the animal grows. In some special cases, such as the abdomens of termite queens and honeypot ants, distention of the abdomen can occur through the process of neosomy, which, in the case of Tunga fleas, occurs through expansion of the arthrodial membranes. In general, however, the rigidity of the exoskeleton means that continuous growth of arthropods is not possible. Therefore, growth is periodic and concentrated into a period of time when the exoskeleton is shed, called moulting or ecdysis, which is under the control of a hormone called ecdysone. Moulting is a complex process that is invariably dangerous for the arthropod involved. Before the old exoskeleton is shed, the cuticle separates from the epidermis through a process called apolysis. Early in the process of apolysis the epithelial cells release enzymatic moulting fluid between the old cuticle and the epidermis. The enzymes partly digest the endocuticle and the epidermis absorbs the digested material for the animal to assimilate. Much of that digested material is re-used to build the new cuticle. Once the new cuticle has formed sufficiently, the animal splits the remaining parts of the old integument along built-in lines of weakness and sheds them in the visible process of ecdysis, generally shedding and discarding the epicuticle and the reduced exocuticle, though some species carry them along for camouflage or protection. The shed portions are called the exuviae.

After the old cuticle is shed, the arthropod typically pumps up its body (for example, by air or water intake) to allow the new cuticle to expand to a larger size: the process of hardening by dehydration of the cuticle then takes place. The new integument still is soft and usually is pale, and it is said to be teneral or callow. It then undergoes a hardening and pigmentation process that might take anything from several minutes to several days, depending on the nature of the animal and the circumstances.

Although the process of ecdysis is metabolically risky and expensive, it does have some advantages. For one thing it permits a complex development cycle of metamorphosis in which young animals may be totally different from older phases, such as the nauplius larvae of crustaceans, the nymphs of say, the Odonata, or the larvae of Endopterygota, such as maggots of flies. Such larval stages commonly have ecological and life cycle roles totally different from those of the mature animals. Secondly, often a major injury in one phase, such as the loss of a leg from an insect nymph, or a claw from a young crab, can be repaired after one or two stages of ecdysis. Similarly, delicate parts that need periodic replacement, such as the outer surfaces of the eye lenses of spiders, or the urticating hairs of caterpillars, can be shed, making way for new structures.

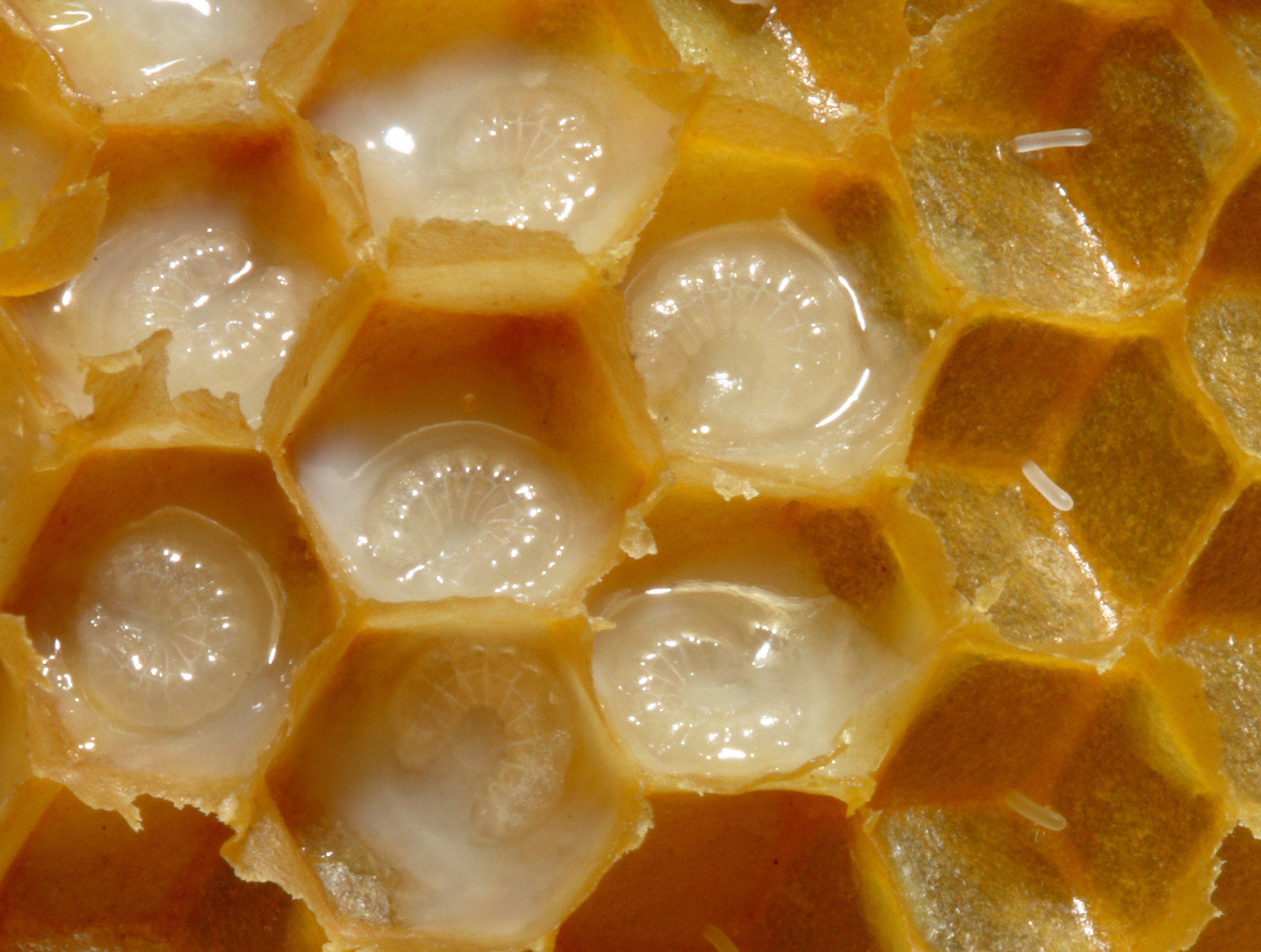
Honeybee larvae have flexible but delicate unsclerotised cuticles.

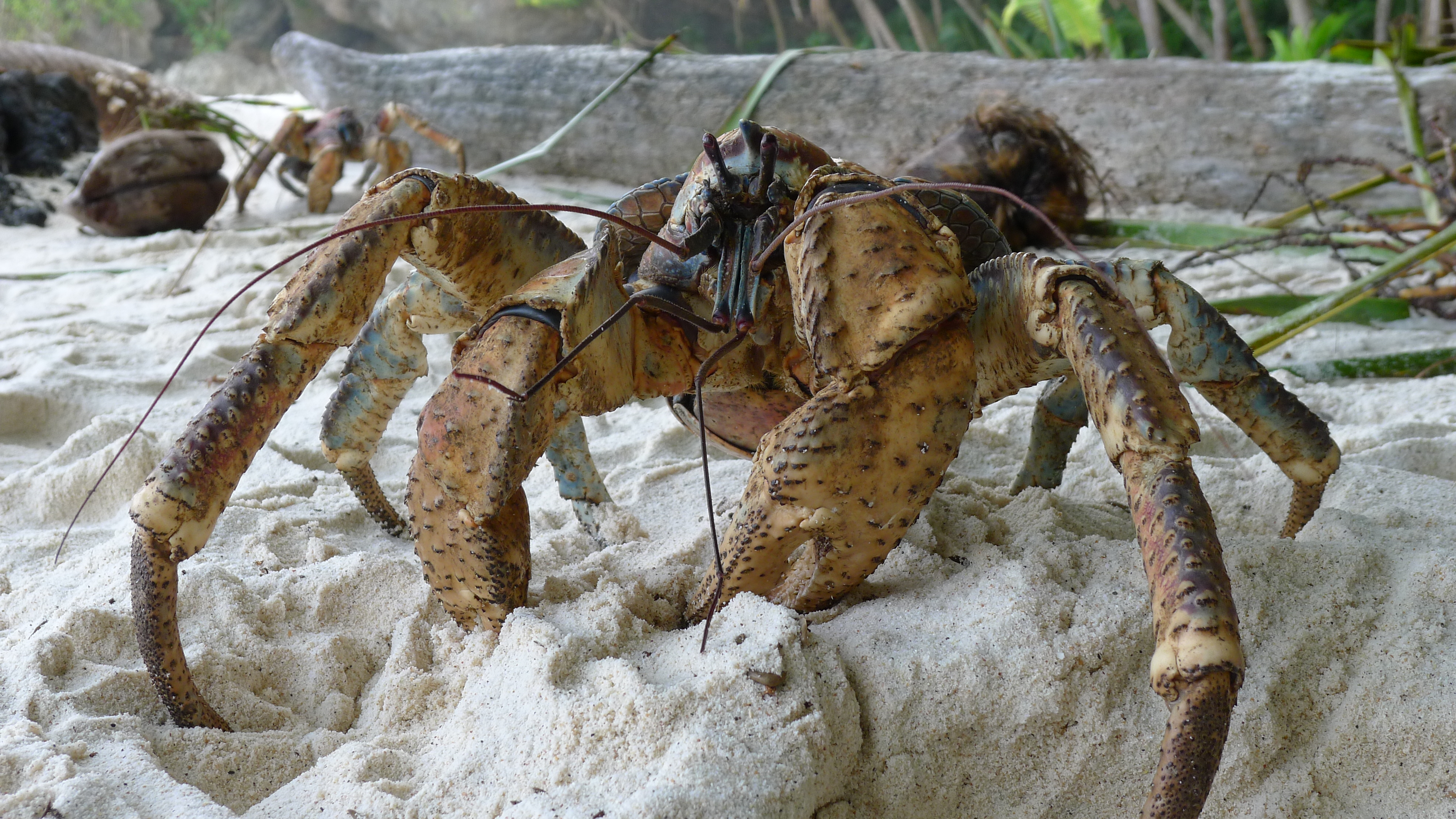
This fully-grown robber crab has tough fabric forming its joints, delicate biomineralized cuticle over its sensory antennae, optic-quality over its eyes, and strong, calcite-reinforced chitin armouring its body and legs; its pincers can break into coconuts

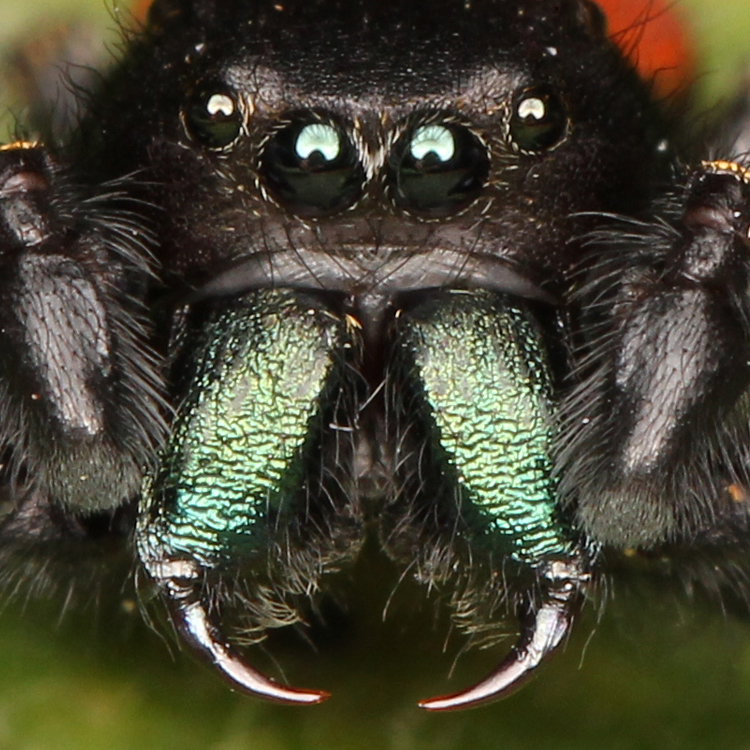
The fangs in spiders' chelicerae are so sclerotised as to be greatly hardened and darkened

== See also ==
- Glossary of arthropod cuticle
- Osteoderm
