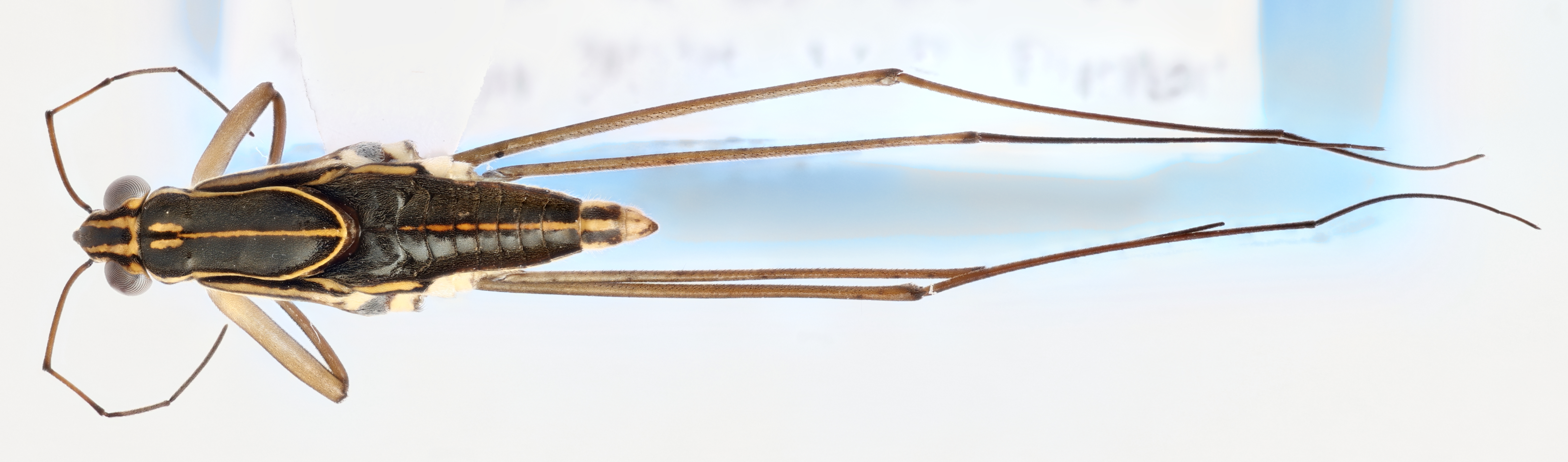

Scientific classification
- Kingdom: Animalia
- Phylum: Arthropoda
- Clade: Pancrustacea
- Class: Insecta
- Order: Hemiptera
- Suborder: Heteroptera
- Family: Gerridae
- Genus: Limnogonus
- Species: L. macroconfusus

Binomial name
- Limnogonus macroconfusus Pintar, 2026

= Limnogonus macroconfusus =

Species of true bug

Limnogonus macroconfusus is a species of water strider in the family Gerridae. It is found from southern southern Texas in the United States south throughout Mexico, Central America, and the Greater Antilles. It was named for being larger than and historically confused with L. franciscanus.
