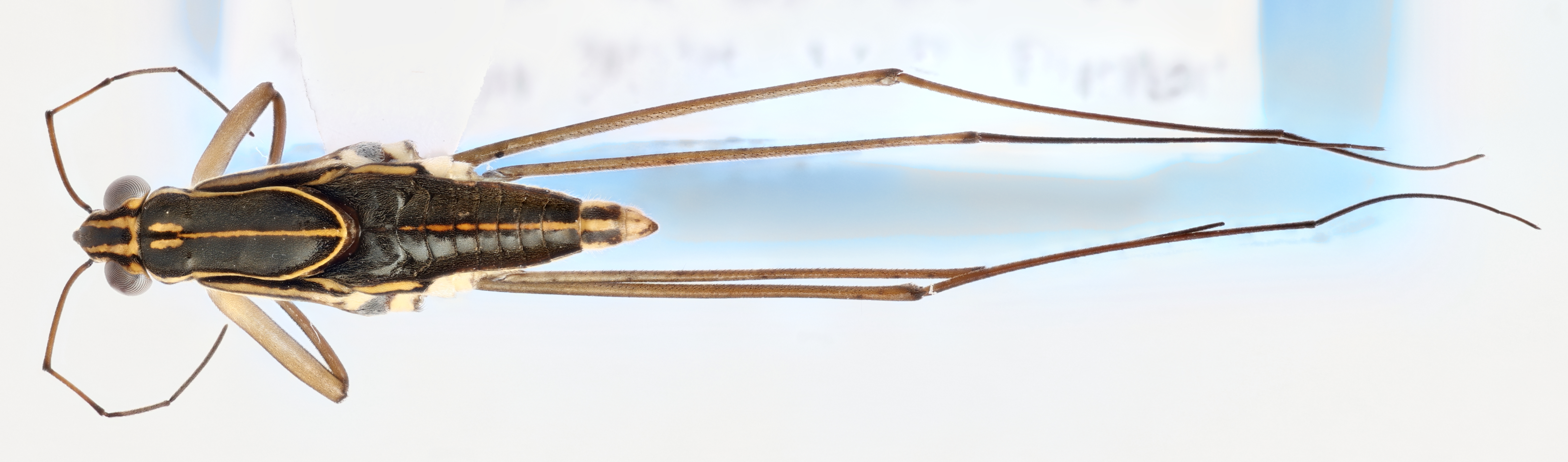
- Limnogonus macroconfusus

Scientific classification
- Kingdom: Animalia
- Phylum: Arthropoda
- Clade: Pancrustacea
- Class: Insecta
- Order: Hemiptera
- Suborder: Heteroptera
- Family: Gerridae
- Subfamily: Gerrinae
- Genus: Limnogonus; Stål, 1868

= Limnogonus =

Genus of true bugs

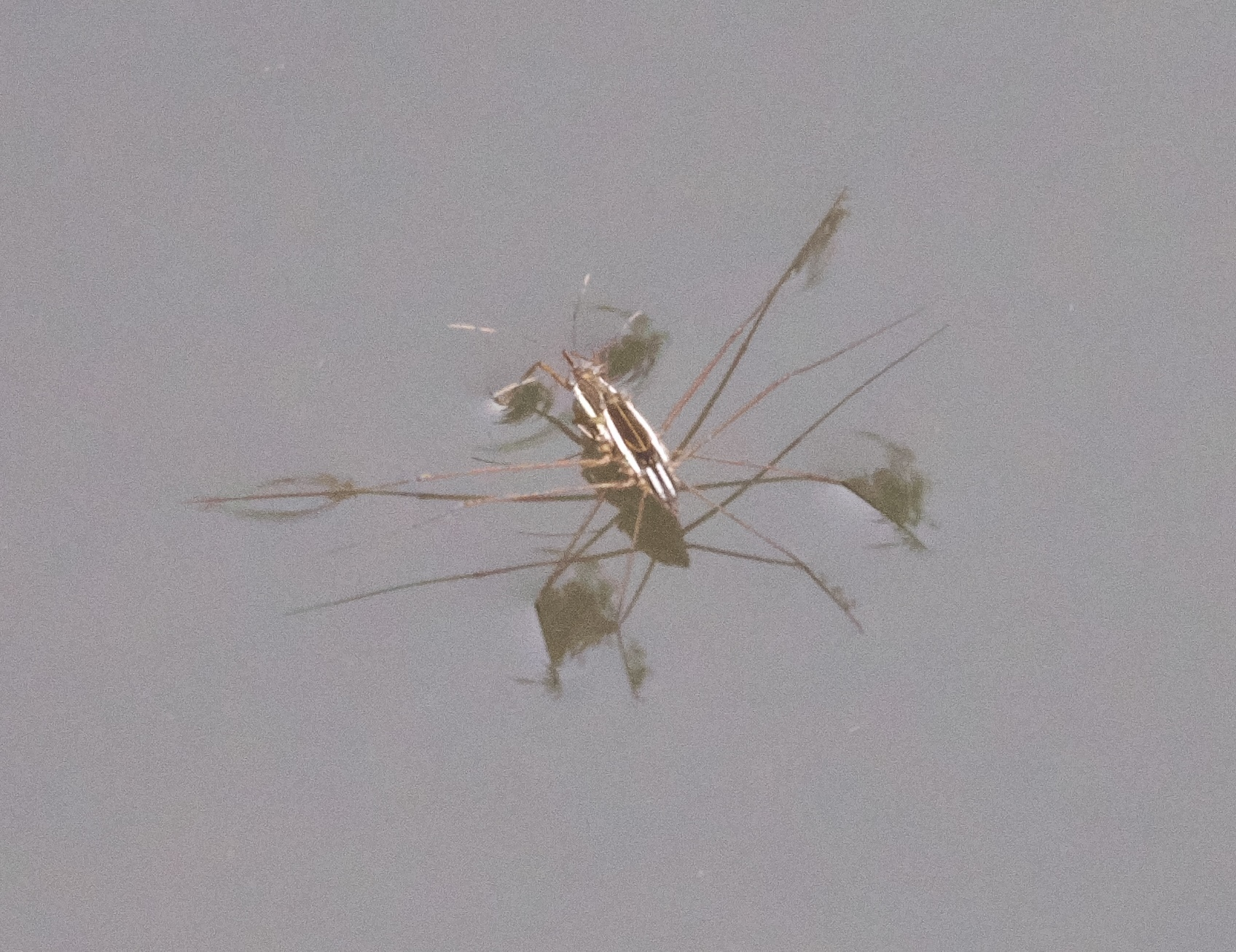
Subgenus Limnogonoides, Namibia

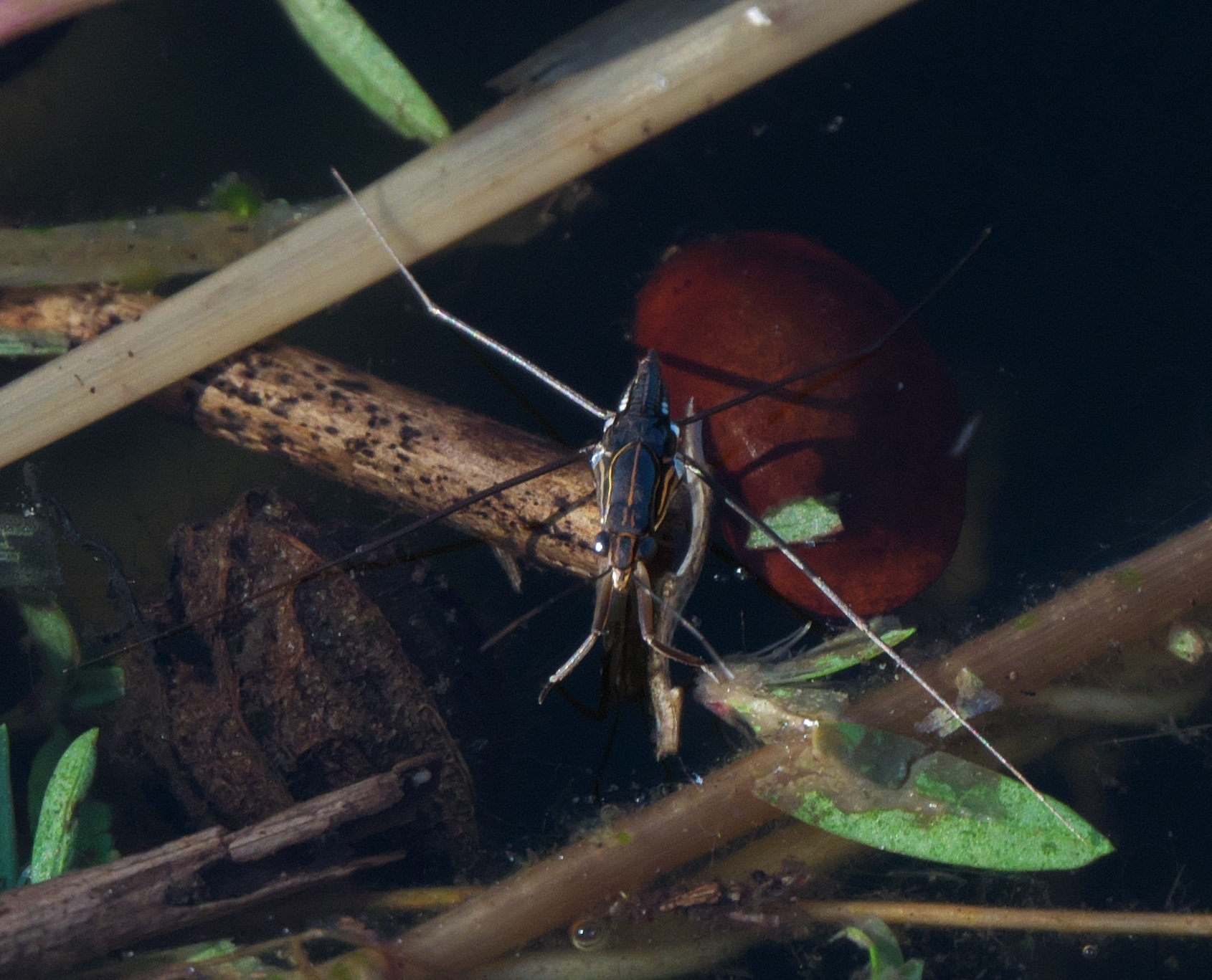
Limnogonus recens, Florida

Limnogonus is a genus of water striders in the family Gerridae. There are 29 described species in Limnogonus. Similar to other gerromorphan bugs, most species of Limnogonus have both macropterous wing morphs, which means that they are often able to fly. The wings are thought to be an adaptation to help the insects get away from drought allowing them to fly to the next available area that has water bodies when the rainy season arrives.

== Species ==
These 29 species belong to the genus Limnogonus and its two subgenera:
Subgenus Limnogonoides:

- Limnogonus capensis (China, 1925)
- Limnogonus curriei Bergroth, 1916
- Limnogonus guttatus Poisson, 1948
- Limnogonus hypoleucus (Gerstaecker, 1873)
- Limnogonus intermedius Poisson, 1941
- Limnogonus nigrescens Poisson, 1941
- Limnogonus pectoralis (Mayr, 1865)
- Limnogonus poissoni Andersen, 1975

Subgenus Limnogonus:

- Limnogonus aduncus Drake & Harris, 1933-01
- Limnogonus anderseni Zettel, 2004-01
- Limnogonus buxtoni Esaki, 1928
- Limnogonus carinatus Rendón, Mondragón-F., & Morales, 2018
- Limnogonus cereiventris (Signoret, 1862)
- Limnogonus cheesmani Lundblad, 1934
- Limnogonus darthulus (Kirkaldy, 1901)
- Limnogonus fossarum (Fabricius, 1775)
- Limnogonus franciscanus (Stål, 1859)
- Limnogonus hungerfordi Andersen, 1975
- Limnogonus hyalinus (Fabricius, 1803)
- Limnogonus ignotus Drake & Harris, 1934
- Limnogonus luctuosus (Montrouzier, 1865)
- Limnogonus lundbladi Usinger, 1946
- Limnogonus macroconfusus Pintar, 2026
- Limnogonus nitidus (Mayr, 1865)
- Limnogonus papuensis Andersen, 1975
- Limnogonus profugus Drake & Harris, 1930-30
- Limnogonus recens Drake & Harris, 1934
- Limnogonus recurvus Drake & Harris, 1930-30
- Limnogonus windi Hungerford & Matsuda, 1961
