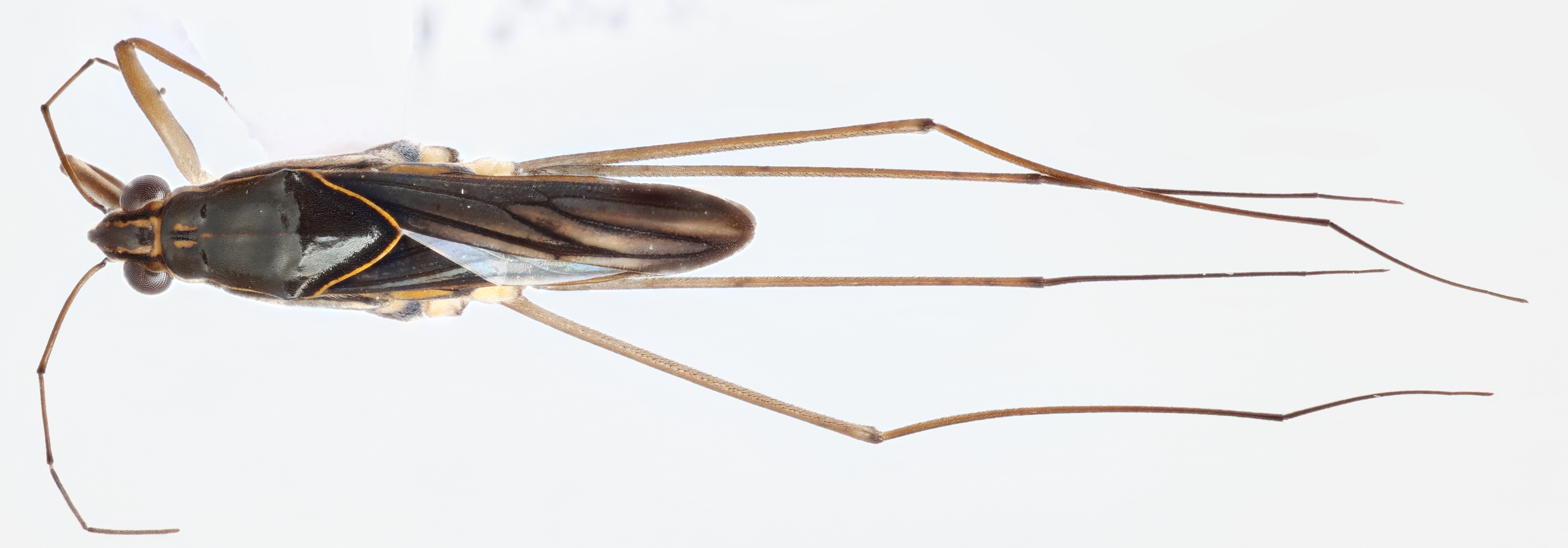

Scientific classification
- Kingdom: Animalia
- Phylum: Arthropoda
- Clade: Pancrustacea
- Class: Insecta
- Order: Hemiptera
- Suborder: Heteroptera
- Family: Gerridae
- Genus: Limnogonus
- Species: L. franciscanus

Binomial name
- Limnogonus franciscanus (Stål, 1859)

= Limnogonus franciscanus =

Species of true bug

Limnogonus franciscanus is a species of water strider in the family Gerridae. It is found from southern Florida in the United States south throughout the Caribbean, eastern Mexico, Central America, and the north and west coasts of South America.
