= Kuaiji Shan =

Kuaiji Shan or Kuaijishan (Chinese: t 會稽山, s 会稽山, p Kuàijī Shān) may refer to either of:

- Mount Xianglu, a peak southeast of Shaoxing in Zhejiang
- The Kuaiji Mountains, a mountain range south of Shaoxing in Zhejiang
