= Kuaiji (disambiguation) =

Kuaiji (Chinese: 會稽/会稽, romanized K'uai-chi in Wade–Giles), also spelled Guiji, is an old name of Shaoxing.

It may also refer to:

- Mount Xianglu near Shaoxing, formerly known as Mount Kuaiji
- Kuaiji Mountains, south of Shaoxing
- Kuaiji Commandery, a historical commandery around the mountain
  - Suzhou, the initial capital of the commandery
- Kuaiji County, a former county around Shaoxing
