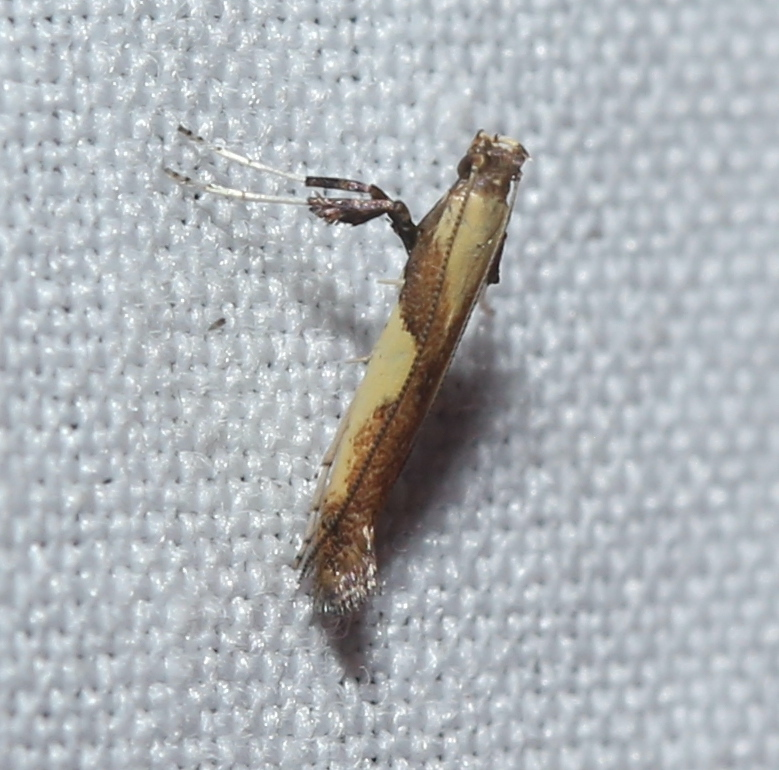

Scientific classification
- Kingdom: Animalia
- Phylum: Arthropoda
- Clade: Pancrustacea
- Class: Insecta
- Order: Lepidoptera
- Family: Gracillariidae
- Genus: Caloptilia
- Species: C. ostryaeella

Binomial name
- Caloptilia ostryaeella (Chambers, 1878)

= Caloptilia ostryaeella =

Species of moth

Caloptilia ostryaeella is a moth of the family Gracillariidae. It is known from Québec, Canada, and Kentucky, Maine, Ohio and Vermont in the United States.

The larvae feed on Carpinus and Ostrya species, including Ostrya virginiana and Ostrya virginica.
