= Coleophora atromarginata =

Scientific classification
- Kingdom: Animalia
- Phylum: Arthropoda
- Class: Insecta
- Order: Lepidoptera
- Family: Coleophoridae
- Genus: Coleophora
- Species: C. atromarginata

Binomial name
- Coleophora atromarginata Braun, 1914

Species of moth

The American pistol casebearer moth (Coleophora atromarginata) is a moth of the family Coleophoridae. It is found in North America, including Ohio, Maryland, Massachusetts and New Brunswick.

The larvae feed on the leaves of Quercus platanoides, Quercus rubra and Prunus serotina, as well as Betula, Carpinus, Ostrya and Carya species. They create a pistol case.
