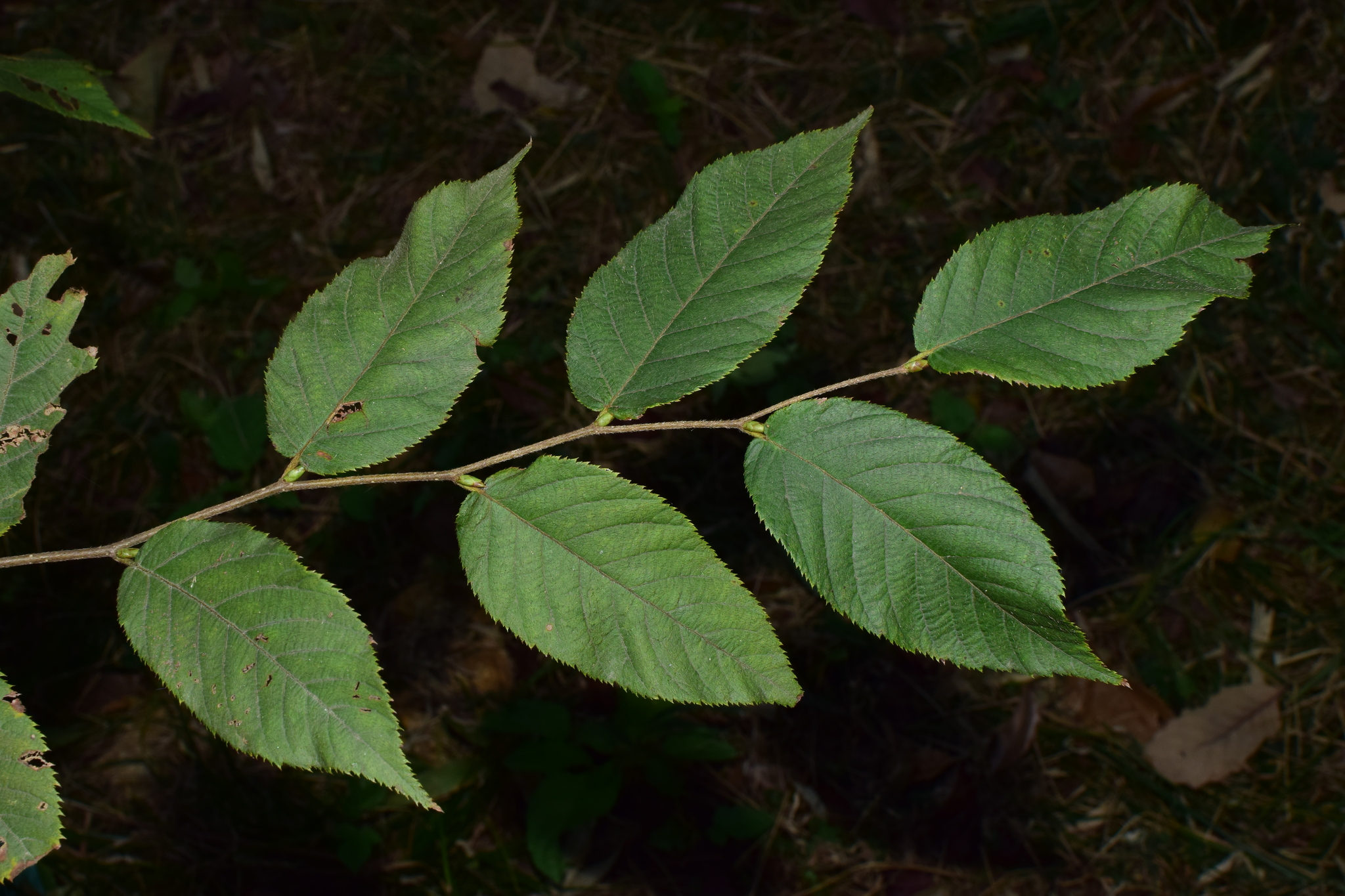

Conservation status
- Critically Endangered (IUCN 3.1)

Scientific classification
- Kingdom: Plantae
- Clade: Tracheophytes
- Clade: Angiosperms
- Clade: Eudicots
- Clade: Rosids
- Order: Fagales
- Family: Betulaceae
- Genus: Ostrya
- Species: O. rehderiana

Binomial name
- Ostrya rehderiana Chun

= Ostrya rehderiana =

Species of tree

Ostrya rehderiana (Zhejiang hop-hornbeam, Chinese: 天目铁木; lit. 'Tianmu iron tree') is a tree in the Betulaceae family. It can grow up to 15 metres (49 ft) tall. It is endemic to Zhejiang province in China. The wild population apparently consists of only five trees on Tianmu Mountain, and the species is under first-class national protection in China.
