= Paramartyria chekiangella =

Scientific classification
- Kingdom: Animalia
- Phylum: Arthropoda
- Clade: Pancrustacea
- Class: Insecta
- Order: Lepidoptera
- Family: Micropterigidae
- Genus: Paramartyria
- Species: P. chekiangella

Binomial name
- Paramartyria chekiangella Kaltenbach & Speidel, 1982

Species of moth

Paramartyria chekiangella is a species of moth belonging to the family Micropterigidae. It was described by Kaltenbach and Speidel, in 1982. It is endemic to China and known from West Tianmu Mountain, its type locality in the Zhejiang province (also romanized as Chekiang).

The wingspan is 7.5 mm (0.30 in).
