= Yandang Mountains =

Mountain range in Zhejiang, China

- 雁荡山
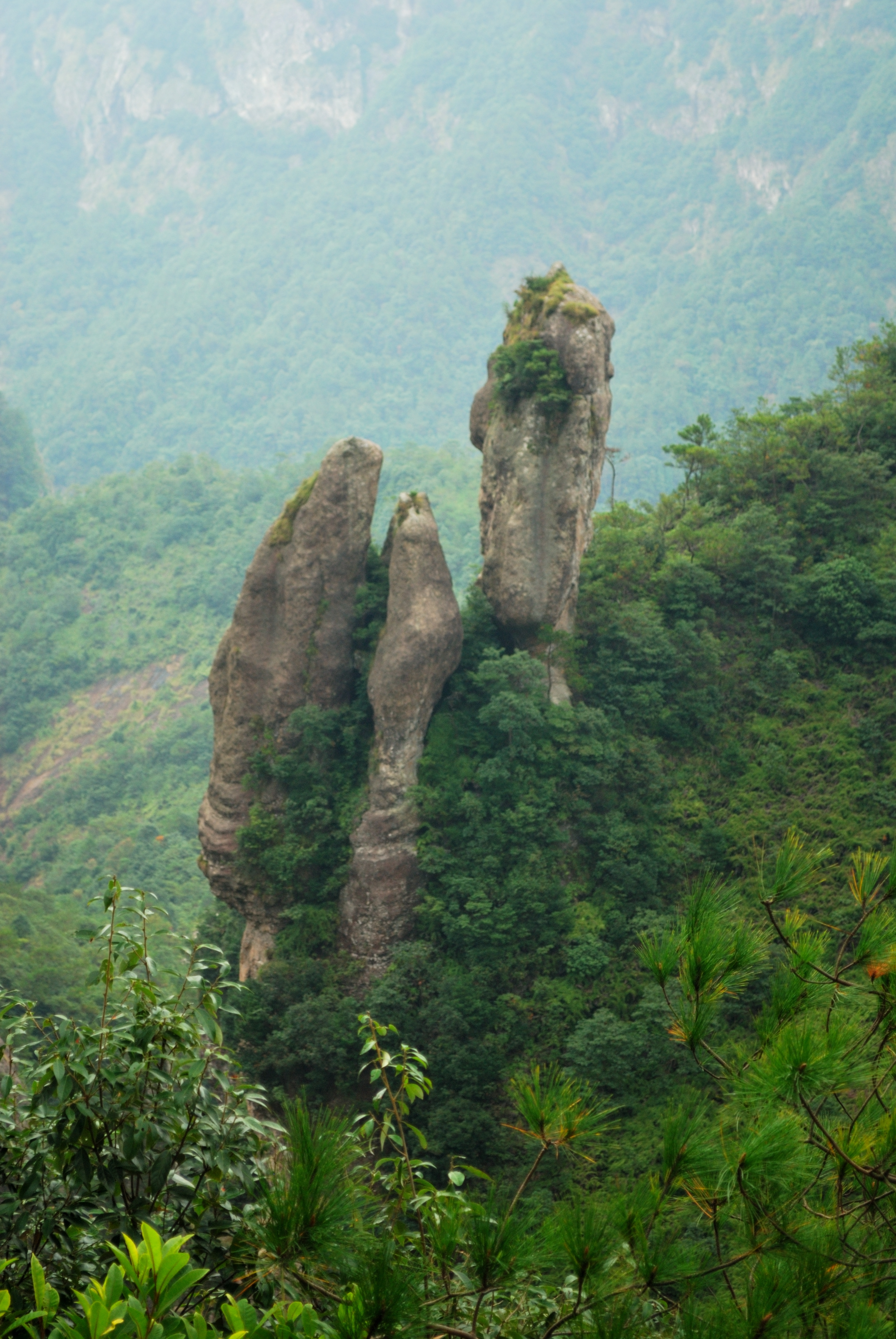
- Rock formation in the Yandang Mountains

Highest point
- Peak: Baigangjian
- Elevation: 1,150 m (3,773 ft)
- Coordinates: 28°22′N 121°04′E

Geography
- Location within China
- Location: Zhejiang, China
- Parent range: Zhejiang–Fujian Hills

Yandang Mountains or Yandangshan (simplified Chinese: 雁荡山; traditional Chinese: 雁蕩山; pinyin: Yàndàng Shān; lit. 'Wild Goose Pond Mountain(s)') refers, in the broad sense, to a coastal mountain range in southeastern Zhejiang province in eastern China, covering much of the prefecture-level city of Wenzhou (from Pingyang County in the south to Yueqing County in the northeast) and extending to the county-level city of Wenling in Taizhou prefecture. The mountain range is divided in two by the Oujiang River, the two parts being the North Yandang and South Yandang. More narrowly, Yandangshan is also used to refer to Mount Yandang, a specific part of the North Yandang around an ancient caldera near a small town of the same name (雁荡镇; Yàndàng Zhèn). The highest peaks of North Yandang are located here, and this is also the main tourist spot. In this article, name "Yandang Mountains" is used to refer the mountain range and "Mt. Yandang" to refer to the caldera.

The main peak of North Yandang, Baigangjian (百岗尖; Bǎigǎng Jiān; 'Hundred-Peak Point'), rises 1,150 m (3,770 ft) above sea level (Note: Other sources give an altitude of 1,056 meters (3,465 ft) or 1,108 meters (3,635 ft)).) There is a radar station on the peak, which is closed to the public.

In 2004, Yandangshan became National Geological Park and in the beginning of 2005, a member of Global Geoparks Network, with total area of 450 km^{2} (170 sq mi). The Yandangshan National Forest Park has an area of 841 hectares (2,080 acres), covering Mt. Yandang.

Mt. Yandang is known for its natural environment, arising from its vertical rock faces and pinnacles, mountain slopes with forests and bamboo groves, streams, waterfalls and caves. The area also hosts several temples and shrines, many of them with a long history; characteristic of the temples is that many of them are built inside caves or in mouths of caves.

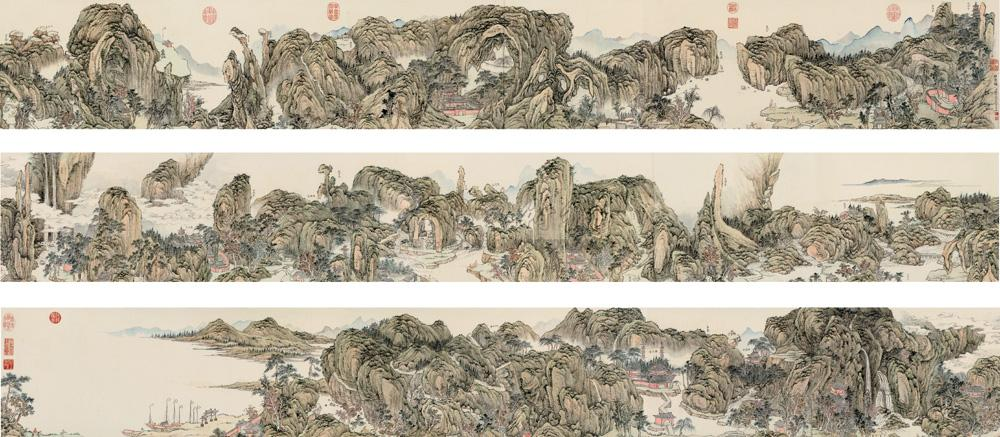
Qing dynasty view Yandangshan.

== Environment ==
Yandang Mountains were formed through volcanic activity during the Cretaceous period c. 100-120 million years (Ma) ago. Similar igneous rocks are widespread in SE China, forming a ~400 km (250 mi) wide and ~2,000 km (1,200 mi) long belt of volcanic-intrusive complexes.

Yandangshan caldera is a round volcanic‐intrusive complex with a diameter of 13 square kilometers (5.0 sq mi), of which the north-east part was destroyed by a later regional fault. Yandangshan volcano erupted in four episodes. The mountain consists of various igneous rocks: ignimbrite, rhyolite, syenite and tuff. The mountain shows often conspicuous layering corresponding to the four different episodes of eruptions, giving rise to terrace-like structures where flatter, forested areas are separated by vertical cliffs.

Mt. Yandang is mostly covered by deciduous and evergreen forests, mixed with some Cunninghamia. Drier ridges can be dominated by small pine trees. There are also some bamboo grooves. Lower slopes and valleys are used for agricultural purposes, for example for growing tea, or as fruit gardens. Herbs and mushrooms collected from the mountain are sold locally.

A number of plant and animal species have been named after Mt. Yandang. A species of sedge, Carex yandangshanica, has been described from Mt. Yandang and two other mountainous locations in Zhejiang. Mt. Yandang has also given its name to Cyclosorus yandangensis, a marsh fern, and Arachniodes yandangshanensis, a holly fern. Among animal species, a mite Eustigmaeus yandangensis has been named after Mt. Yandang, but this has been challenged.

Yandang Mountains are everywhere influenced by human activity; there is an extensive network of official tourist paths, clearings for fire-prevention, and unofficial paths used by the local people for collecting resources from the mountains; nevertheless, because of the steep terrain, some parts are difficult to access. Whatever wildlife survives tends to be very elusive. Notable inhabitants of Yandang Mountains include Cabot's tragopan, a nationally protected species in China. Chinese pangolin is also reported to live in Yandang Mountains.

Yandang Mountains have been considered as one of the areas where South China tiger might still persist, but there is no positive evidence and the species is considered functionally extinct in the wild.

== Cultural significance ==
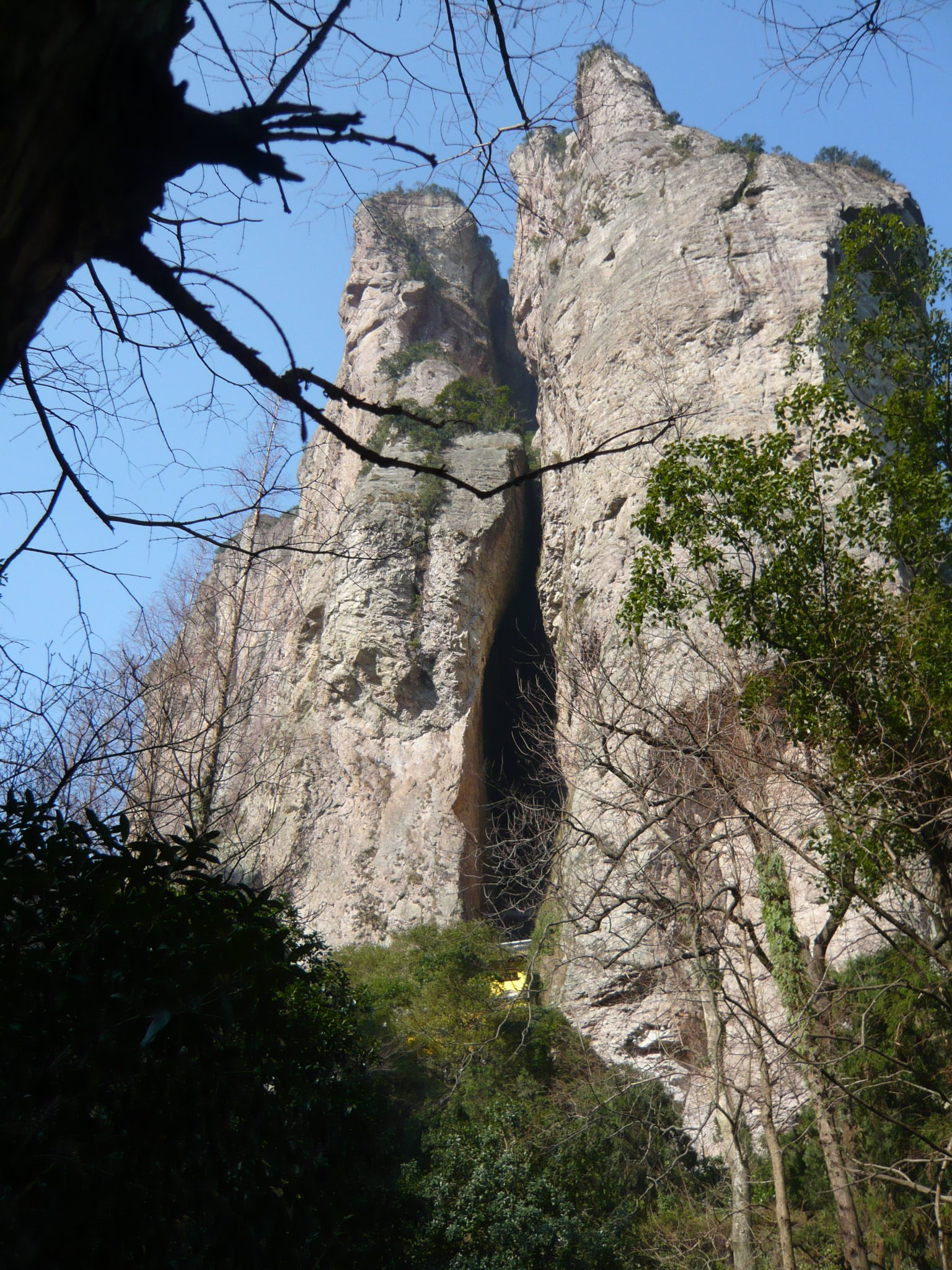
Lingfeng Peak. The big crack is the Guanyin Cave, with the lower gate of the Guanyin Temple just visible.

Yandang Mountains are dotted with temples and shrines, many of them with long history. Most of them were destroyed during the Cultural Revolution, but many have been rebuilt.

Guanyin Temple (or Avalokitesvara Temple) is a Buddhist temple located on Mt. Yandang, in the Lingfeng Peaks scenic area. The temple lies between two rock peaks leaning against each other such that a big crack-like cave is formed; the peaks are together known as the "Holding Palms Peak". The cave is 100 metres high, with the cave bottom sloping steeply up. The temple follows this natural structure and has nine levels (floors), with the Guanyin shrine occupying the highest, most hidden section of the cave. The temple was first built in 265.

== Tourism ==
=== North Yandang ===
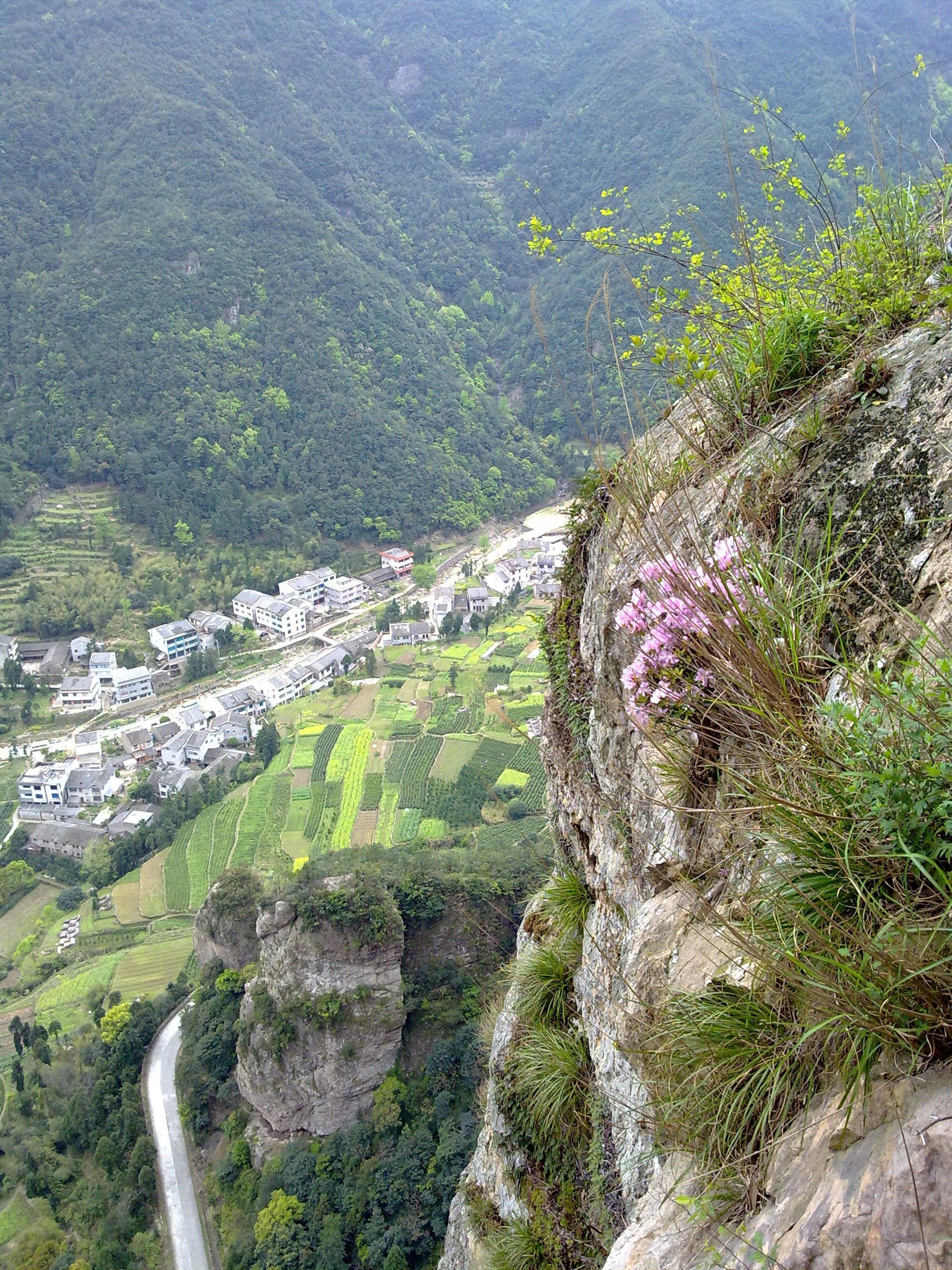
A view from the Lingyan Rock.

North Yandangshan, in the geographic sense, contains three scenic areas, Yangjiaodong/Fangshan, Middle Yandangshan and North Yandang, the latter commonly referred to as the Yandangshan, the most famous of the scenic areas in the Yandang Mountains.

North Yandang Scenic Area is centered on Mt. Yandang and has an area of 450 km^{2} (170 sq mi). China's National Tourism Administration rated North Yandang as a "5A scenic area" in 2007, up from "4A" before. A number of touristic attractions, or "scenic spots", have been develop around Mt. Yandang, the most famous being:

- Lingfeng Peaks (Chinese: 灵峰; lit. 'Spiritual peaks').
- Lingyan Rock (Chinese: 灵岩; lit. 'Spiritual rock').
- Great Dragon Pond Waterfall (Chinese: 大龙湫; pinyin: Dàlóngqiū; lit. 'Big dragon pond').

The great majority of domestic tourists only visit the key scenic areas, which can get very crowded, and not all development has been kind to the surroundings. However, areas outside the formally developed scenic spots can be quite serene. Mt. Yandang is also increasingly popular as a hiking area for urbanites.

Mt. Yandang can be accessed using the Yandangshan Railway Station on the fast railway track between Ningbo and Wenzhou.

Middle Yandang Scenic Area is a "4A scenic area" in south of Yueqing County. The total area of the scenic area is 93 km^{2}.

Yangjiaodong/Fangshan Scenic Area is on the border between Wenzhou and Taizhou. This is a single mountain, but the name of the scenic area changes on the border. Yangjiaodong (Chinese: 羊角洞) is the Wenzhou half, and Fangshan (Chinese: 方山) the Taizhou one.

=== South Yandang ===
South Yandang is a "4A scenic area" and consists of five scenic spots near Nanyanzhen town in Pingyang County. East and West Caves are the most famous sights. The total area of the scenic area is 169 km^{2}.
