= Coleophora albovanescens =

Scientific classification
- Kingdom: Animalia
- Phylum: Arthropoda
- Clade: Pancrustacea
- Class: Insecta
- Order: Lepidoptera
- Family: Coleophoridae
- Genus: Coleophora
- Species: C. albovanescens

Binomial name
- Coleophora albovanescens Heinrich, 1926

Species of moth

Coleophora albovanescens is a moth of the family Coleophoridae. It is found in North America, including New York and Nova Scotia.

The larvae feed on the leaves of Betula, Fagus, Fraxinus and Ostrya species. They create a pistol case.
