= Amorpha (disambiguation) =

Amorpha may refer to:

- Amorpha, a plant genus in the family Fabaceae
- Amorpha (moth), a moth genus in the family Sphingidae
