= Southeast Hills =

Hilly region of China

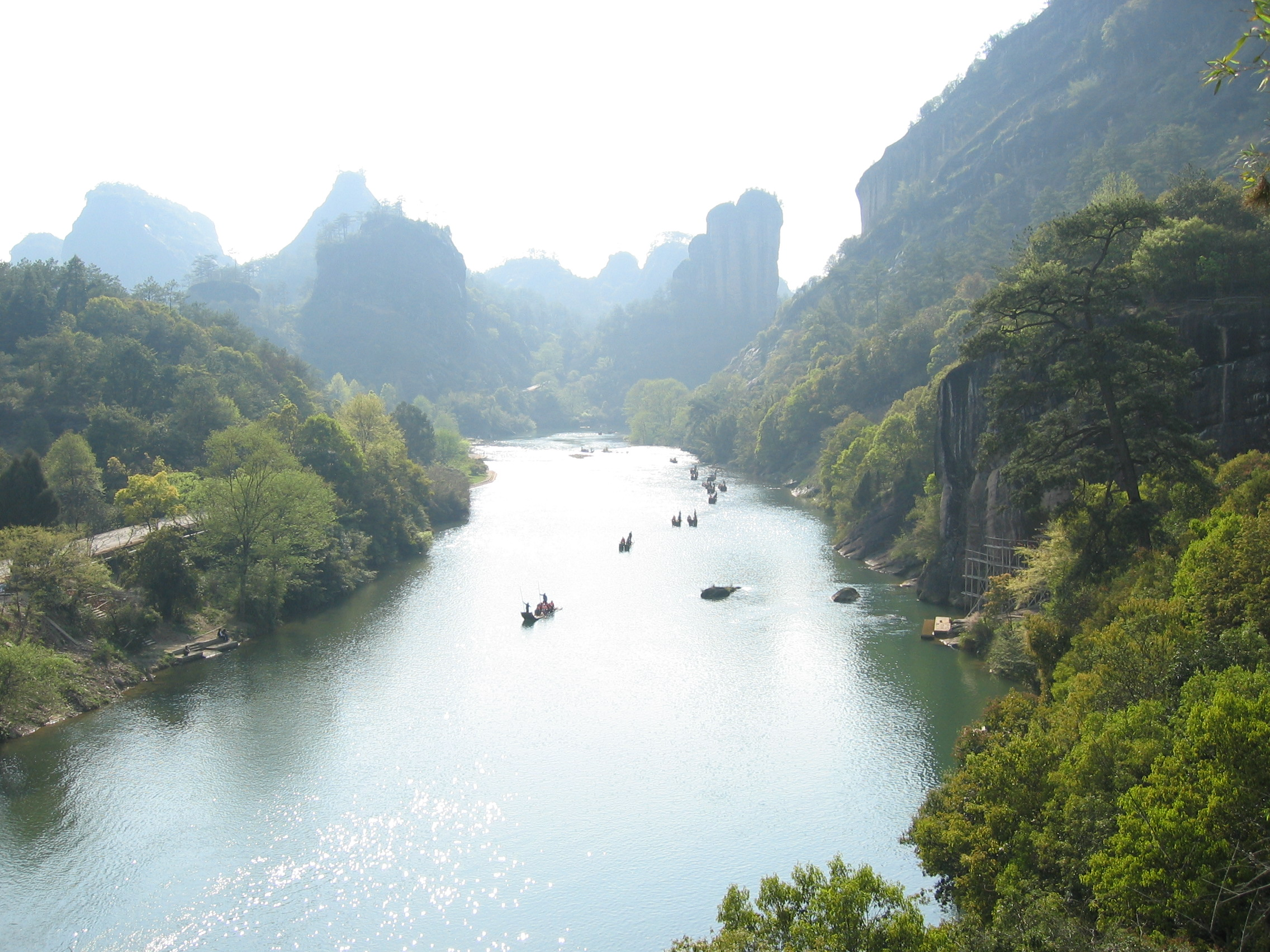
Wuyi Mountains

The Southeast Hills (Chinese: 东南丘陵), also translated as the Southeastern Hills or Dongnan Qiuling, are a hilly landform region located in southeastern China. They extend northwards to the Yangtze River valley, connect westwards with the Yunnan–Guizhou Plateau, and border the coast to the east, forming a vast expanse of hills and low mountains. The area north of the Nanling is often referred to as the Jiangnan Hills, while the area south of the Nanling is known as the Liangguang Hills. Within Zhejiang and Fujian, it is also commonly called the Zhejiang–Fujian Hills. The principal mountain ranges of the Southeast Hills include Huangshan, Jiuhuashan, Hengshan, Danxia, Wuyi, and Nanling.

== Geography ==
The Southeast Hills are characterised predominantly by low mountains and rolling hills. The terrain generally slopes from west to east, gradually descending towards the coastal plains. The bedrock mainly consists of granite, gneiss and other metamorphic rocks, marking the region as an ancient geological structural zone. Prolonged weathering and fluvial erosion have shaped a landscape of interwoven low mountains, hills, terraces and valleys. Surface relief is relatively gentle, with many ridges appearing as residual hills. River valleys criss-cross between the hills, creating a distinctive pattern of alternating uplands and densely distributed valleys. Along the coast, crustal movements and marine erosion have produced landforms such as marine terraces, sea cliffs and alluvial plains.

Most elevations in the Southeast Hills are around 500 m (1,600 ft) above sea level, although a number of peaks exceed 1,000 m (3,300 ft). The mountains are generally low and rounded, with moderate slopes, interspersed with river valleys and flat basins. Ongoing crustal uplift combined with long-term river incision has resulted in sharply rising peak clusters and well-developed gullies, with Danxia landforms commonly observed. Weathered materials accumulate in low-lying basins, where iron-rich substances oxidise fully to form red soils, giving parts of the region a distinctive red rock and red earth appearance.

== Divisions ==
=== Jiangnan Hills ===
The Jiangnan low mountains and hills lie south of the Yangtze River and north of the Nanling, extending eastwards to the Wuyi Mountains and westwards to the Xuefeng Mountains. The structural framework of the landscape consists of several roughly northsouth aligned belts of low mountains and hills, separated by lowland basins. Topographic differentiation is often controlled by northeast-trending tectonic belts. In the east, the Tianmu and Huaiyu Mountains dominate; the central section includes the Wuyi and Jiuling Mountains; while the western part is centred on the Xuefeng Mountains. Most mountain elevations are around 1,000 m (3,300 ft), with a few peaks approaching 2,000 m (6,600 ft). River valleys and intermontane basins are interspersed among the uplands, linking with the surrounding lowlands of Dongting Lake and Poyang Lake.

Since the Mesozoic, north-northeast to northeast trending folds and faults have developed, influencing magmatic activity and forming red fault-depression basins. During the Cenozoic, gradual regional uplift combined with differential movements further shaped the evolution of basins and river valleys, leaving distinctive geomorphological features in areas such as the Gan River valley near Ganzhou, the Gan River valley between Wan'an and Ji'an, and the lake-surrounding drainage systems.

=== Southeast Coastal Hills ===
The Southeast Coastal Hills include the mountains of south-western Guangxi, together with Dayao, Jiulian and Lianhua Mountains to their north, as well as the coastal mountains along the Guangxi–Guangdong border. Low mountains and hills are generally distributed in northeast-trending belts and decline overall towards the southeast. Most elevations range 1,000–1,500 m (3,300–4,900 ft), with a few peaks approaching 2,000 m (6,600 ft). Along the coast, bays alternate with river-valley plains, creating a complex combination of landform types.

The basement strata consist mainly of ancient metamorphic rocks, Palaeozoic formations, and Mesozoic volcanic and granitic rocks. Structural patterns are dominated by northeast trends, with north-east and north-west faults also prominent, shaping folded fault blocks and fault-depression basins. Along the southeastern coast, low mountains and hills have developed multiple levels of planation surfaces under northeast structural control. Later northwest trending neotectonic activity has produced marked elevation differences and coastal fault-depression landforms. Typical basin and bay systems include Hangzhou Bay, the Han River Delta, and the Pearl River Delta. Cenozoic volcanic activity is particularly evident on the Leizhou Peninsula and in northern Hainan Island, where basalt cover overlaps with coastal plains and bay landforms.

The arcuate structural landform of Guangxi is located in the southwest. Controlled by arcuate structural belts and near north–south compression, structural lines curve southwards, guiding the distribution of mountains and basins. This configuration exerts clear control over the courses of rivers such as the You River and Yu River, as well as the development of valley basins, forming a regional pattern dominated by planation surfaces, terraces and fault-block landforms.
