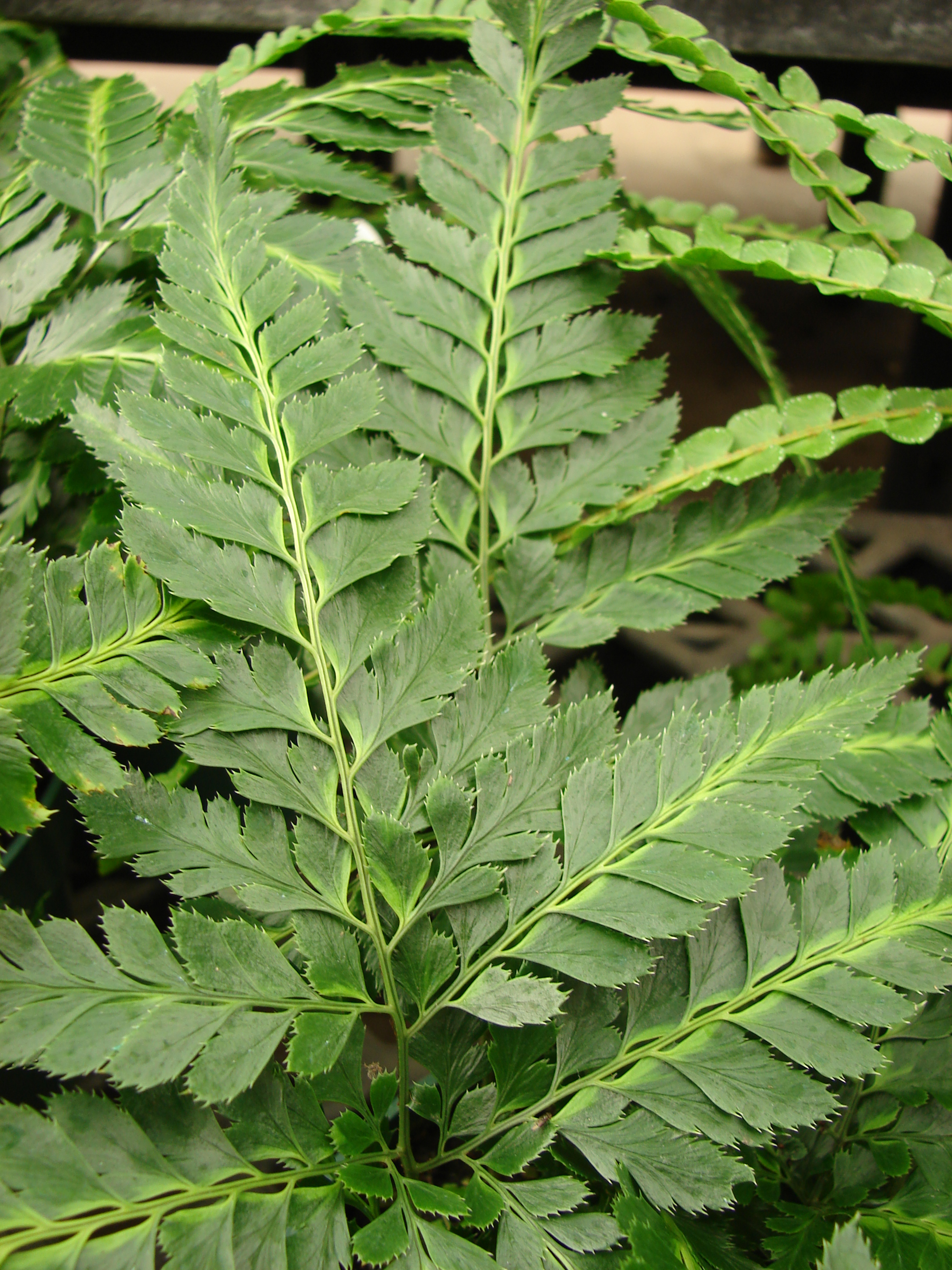

Scientific classification
- Kingdom: Plantae
- Clade: Tracheophytes
- Division: Polypodiophyta
- Class: Polypodiopsida
- Order: Polypodiales
- Suborder: Polypodiineae
- Family: Dryopteridaceae
- Genus: Arachniodes
- Species: A. simplicior

Binomial name
- Arachniodes simplicior (Makino) Ohwi

Synonyms
- Arachniodes aristatissima Ching; Arachniodes calcarata Ching; Arachniodes fujiangensis Ching; Arachniodes holttumii (Tagawa) Seriz.; Arachniodes jiulungshanensis Ching; Arachniodes liyangensis Ching & Y.C.Lan; Arachniodes parasimplicior Ching ex Y.T.Hsieh; Arachniodes simplicior (Makino) Ching; Arachniodes tibetana Ching & S.K.Wu; Arachniodes yasu-inouei Kurata; Aspidium aristatum var. simplicior Makino; Buesia simplicior (Makino) Kurata; Polystichopsis simplicior (Makino) Tagawa; Polystichum aristatum var. simplicior (Makino) Matsum.; Polystichum simplicius (Makino) Tagawa; Rumohra simplicior (Makino) Ching

= Arachniodes simplicior =

Species of fern

Arachniodes simplicior, the simpler East Indian hollyfern, East Indian holly fern, or variegated shield fern, is a species of fern in the family Dryopteridaceae.

== Distribution ==
China (Anhui, Chongqing, Fujian, SE-Gansu, Guangxi, Guizhou, Henan, Hubei, Hunan, Jiangsu, Jiangxi, S-Shaanxi, Sichuan, Yunnan, Zhejiang); SW-Tibet; Japan; South Korea; Vietnam
