= Paramartyria semifasciella =

Scientific classification
- Kingdom: Animalia
- Phylum: Arthropoda
- Class: Insecta
- Order: Lepidoptera
- Family: Micropterigidae
- Genus: Paramartyria
- Species: P. semifasciella

Binomial name
- Paramartyria semifasciella Issiki, 1931

Species of moth

Paramartyria semifasciella is a species of moth belonging to the family Micropterigidae. It was described by Syuti Issiki in 1931. It is known from Japan.

The length of the forewings is 4.1–4.8 mm for males and 4.4–4.8 mm for females.
