= Paramartyria maculatella =

Scientific classification
- Kingdom: Animalia
- Phylum: Arthropoda
- Class: Insecta
- Order: Lepidoptera
- Family: Micropterigidae
- Genus: Paramartyria
- Species: P. maculatella

Binomial name
- Paramartyria maculatella Issiki, 1931

Species of moth

Paramartyria maculatella is a species of moth belonging to the family Micropterigidae. It was described by Syuti Issiki in 1931. It is endemic to Taiwan.
