= Paramartyria cipingana =

Scientific classification
- Kingdom: Animalia
- Phylum: Arthropoda
- Class: Insecta
- Order: Lepidoptera
- Family: Micropterigidae
- Genus: Paramartyria
- Species: P. cipingana

Binomial name
- Paramartyria cipingana C.-K. Yang, 1980

Species of moth

Paramartyria cipingana is a species of moth belonging to the family Micropterigidae. It was described in 1980. It is known from the Jinggang Mountains in Jiangxi, China.
