= Paramartyria anmashana =

Scientific classification
- Kingdom: Animalia
- Phylum: Arthropoda
- Class: Insecta
- Order: Lepidoptera
- Family: Micropterigidae
- Genus: Paramartyria
- Species: P. anmashana

Binomial name
- Paramartyria anmashana Hashimoto, 2000

Species of moth

Paramartyria anmashana is a species of moth belonging to the family Micropterigidae. It was described in 2000 and is known only from Taiwan. The type series was collected at an elevation of 2,200 m (7,200 ft) above sea level on Anmashan (Mount Anma) in Taichung.

The forewing length is 4.3–4.9 mm (0.17–0.19 in) for males and approximately 4.2 mm (0.17 in) for females.
