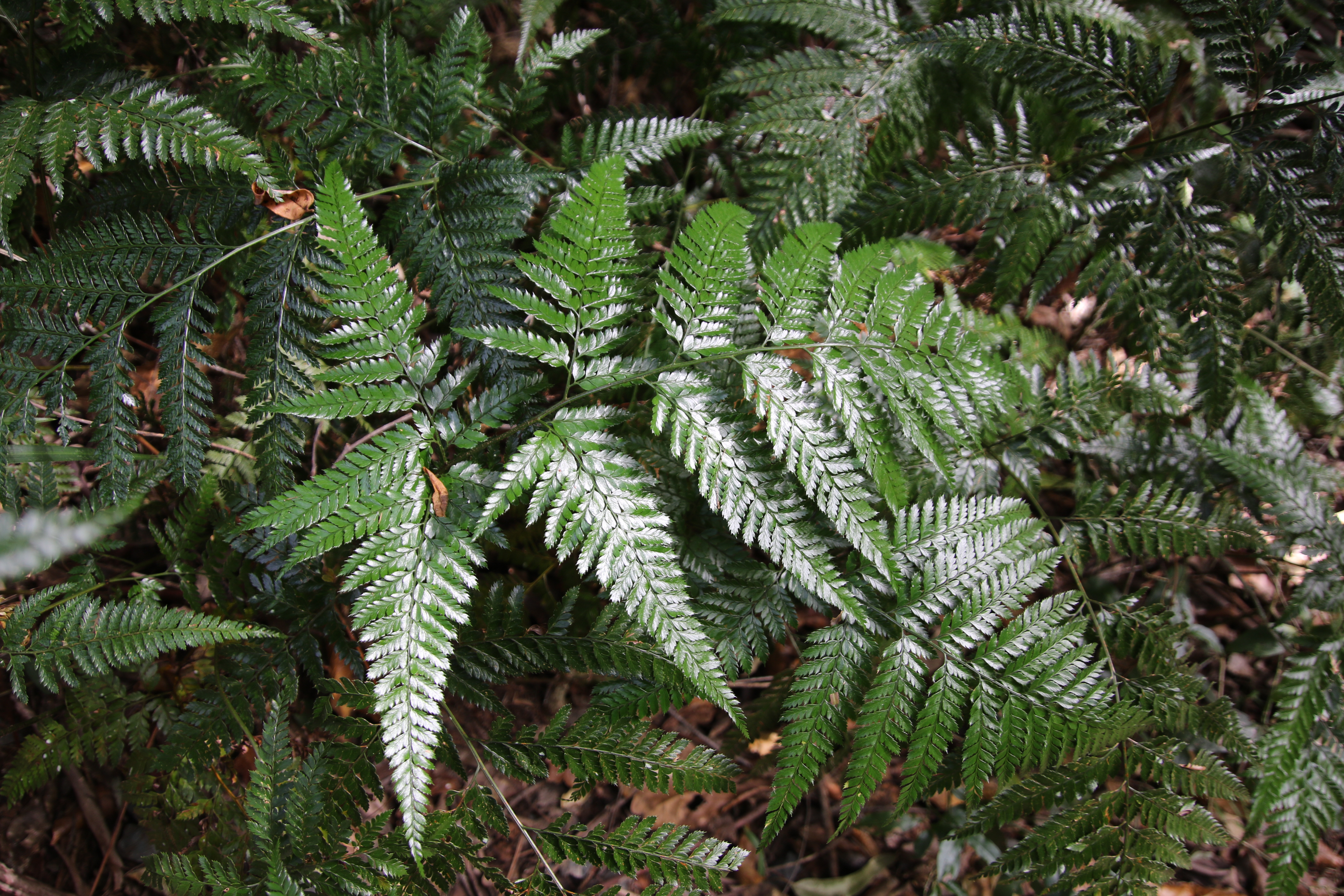
- At Sherwood Nature Reserve, Australia

Scientific classification
- Kingdom: Plantae
- Clade: Tracheophytes
- Division: Polypodiophyta
- Class: Polypodiopsida
- Order: Polypodiales
- Suborder: Polypodiineae
- Family: Dryopteridaceae
- Genus: Arachniodes
- Species: A. aristata

Binomial name
- Arachniodes aristata (G.Forst.) Tindale

Synonyms
- Polypodium aristatum G.Forst.

= Arachniodes aristata =

Species of fern

Arachniodes aristata is a species of fern in the family Dryopteridaceae. It is a glossy fern with fronds up to 1 m (3 ft 3 in) long. The type specimen was collected by George Forster at an unknown island in the Pacific Ocean, when travelling on the second voyage of James Cook. This plant was first formally named Polypodium aristatum in 1786 in the Florulae Insularum Australium Prodromus, published by his father Johann Reinhold Forster. The specific epithet "aristata" derives from Latin, meaning "bearing a bristle". It is native to islands of the Pacific.
