= Paramartyria =

Scientific classification
- Kingdom: Animalia
- Phylum: Arthropoda
- Class: Insecta
- Order: Lepidoptera
- Family: Micropterigidae
- Genus: Paramartyria; Issiki, 1931

Species
- 8 species (see text)

Genus of moths in family Micropterigidae

Paramartyria is a genus of small primitive metallic moths in the family Micropterigidae. They occur in southern and eastern China, Taiwan, and Japan.

== Species ==
There are eight species:

- Paramartyria anmashana Hashimoto, 2000
- Paramartyria bimaculella Issiki, 1931
- Paramartyria chekiangella Kaltenbach & Speidel, 1982
- Paramartyria cipingana Yang, 1980
- Paramartyria immaculatella Issiki, 1931
- Paramartyria maculatella Issiki, 1931
- Paramartyria ovalella Issiki, 1931
- Paramartyria semifasciella Issiki, 1931
