= Coleophora ostryae =

Scientific classification
- Kingdom: Animalia
- Phylum: Arthropoda
- Clade: Pancrustacea
- Class: Insecta
- Order: Lepidoptera
- Family: Coleophoridae
- Genus: Coleophora
- Species: C. ostryae

Binomial name
- Coleophora ostryae Clemens, 1861

Synonyms
- Coleophora rufoluteella Chambers, 1874; Coleophora carpinella Heinrich, 1914

Species of moth

Coleophora ostryae is a moth of the family Coleophoridae found in North America, including Maryland and Ontario.

The larvae feed on the leaves of Ostrya, Carpinus, Carya, and Quercus species. They create a spatulate leaf case.
