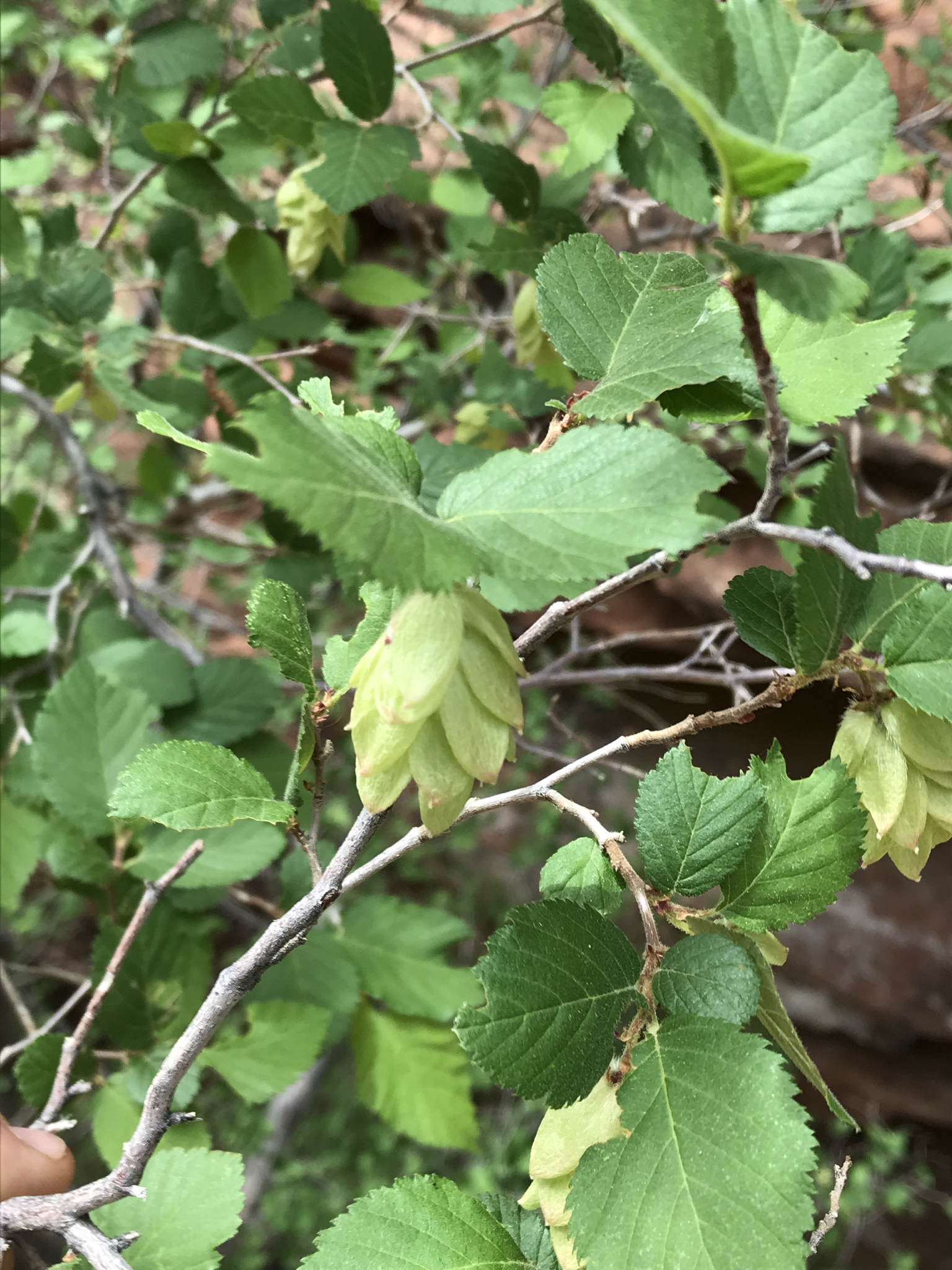

Conservation status
- Least Concern (IUCN 3.1)

- Vulnerable (NatureServe)

Scientific classification
- Kingdom: Plantae
- Clade: Embryophytes
- Clade: Tracheophytes
- Clade: Angiosperms
- Clade: Eudicots
- Clade: Rosids
- Order: Fagales
- Family: Betulaceae
- Genus: Ostrya
- Species: O. knowltonii

Binomial name
- Ostrya knowltonii Coville
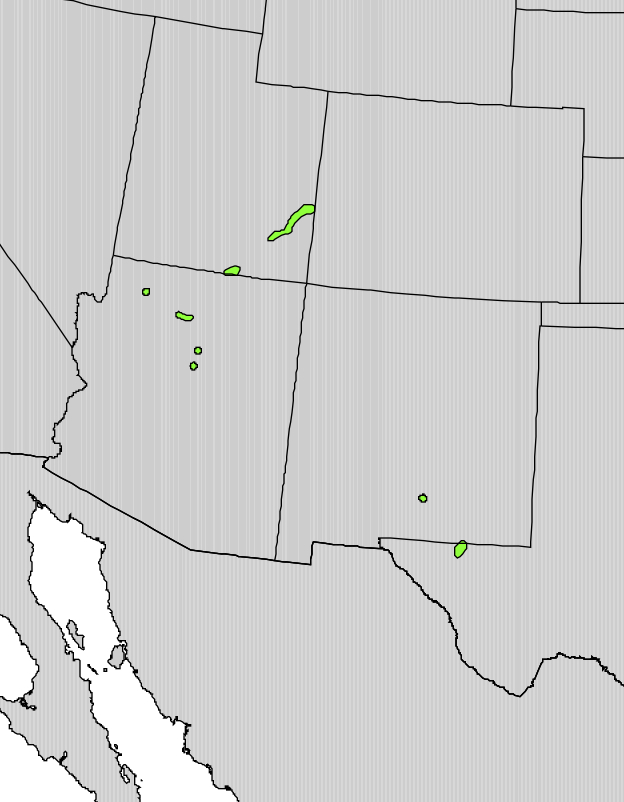
- Natural range

Synonyms
- Ostrya chisosensis Correll; Ostrya knowltonii var. chisosensis (Correll) A.E.Murray

= Ostrya knowltonii =

Species of tree

Ostrya knowltonii is a species of tree known by the common names Knowlton's hophornbeam, western hophornbeam, woolly hophornbeam, and wolf hophornbeam. It is also one of many trees called ironwood. It is native to Utah, Arizona, New Mexico, and Texas in the United States, but its distribution is localized and sporadic.

This plant is a tree that grows to 9 to 12 m in maximum height. The trunk is short and it divides into many crooked branches. The crown is rounded. The bark is brownish gray and furrowed into scales or strips. The leaves are up to 6.3 cm long and have serrated edges. Male and female flowers are borne in separate catkins, the male up to 3 cm long and the female up to one. The fruit is a nutlet.

This plant grows in the American Southwest, including the rims of the Grand Canyon. It grows in oak woodlands, pinyon-juniper woodlands, and Ponderosa pine forests. It occurs in sunny, dry locations.

The wood of the tree is hard and tough, and it can be used to make durable items such as fence posts and tool handles.
