= Arachniodes tsiangiana =

Conservation status
- Endangered (IUCN 3.1)

Scientific classification
- Kingdom: Plantae
- Clade: Tracheophytes
- Division: Polypodiophyta
- Class: Polypodiopsida
- Order: Polypodiales
- Suborder: Polypodiineae
- Family: Dryopteridaceae
- Genus: Arachniodes
- Species: A. tsiangiana

Binomial name
- Arachniodes tsiangiana (Ching) Nakaike

Synonyms
- Dryopteris tsiangiana (Ching) R.M.Tryon & A.F.Tryon; Phanerophlebiopsis tsiangiana Ching

Species of plant

Arachniodes tsiangiana is a species of fern in the family Dryopteridaceae. It is endemic to southeastern Guizhou in southern China. Its natural habitat is subtropical moist lowland forest. It is threatened by habitat loss.
