= Zhejiang–Fujian Hills =

Mountainous region of China

- Fujian–Zhejiang Hills
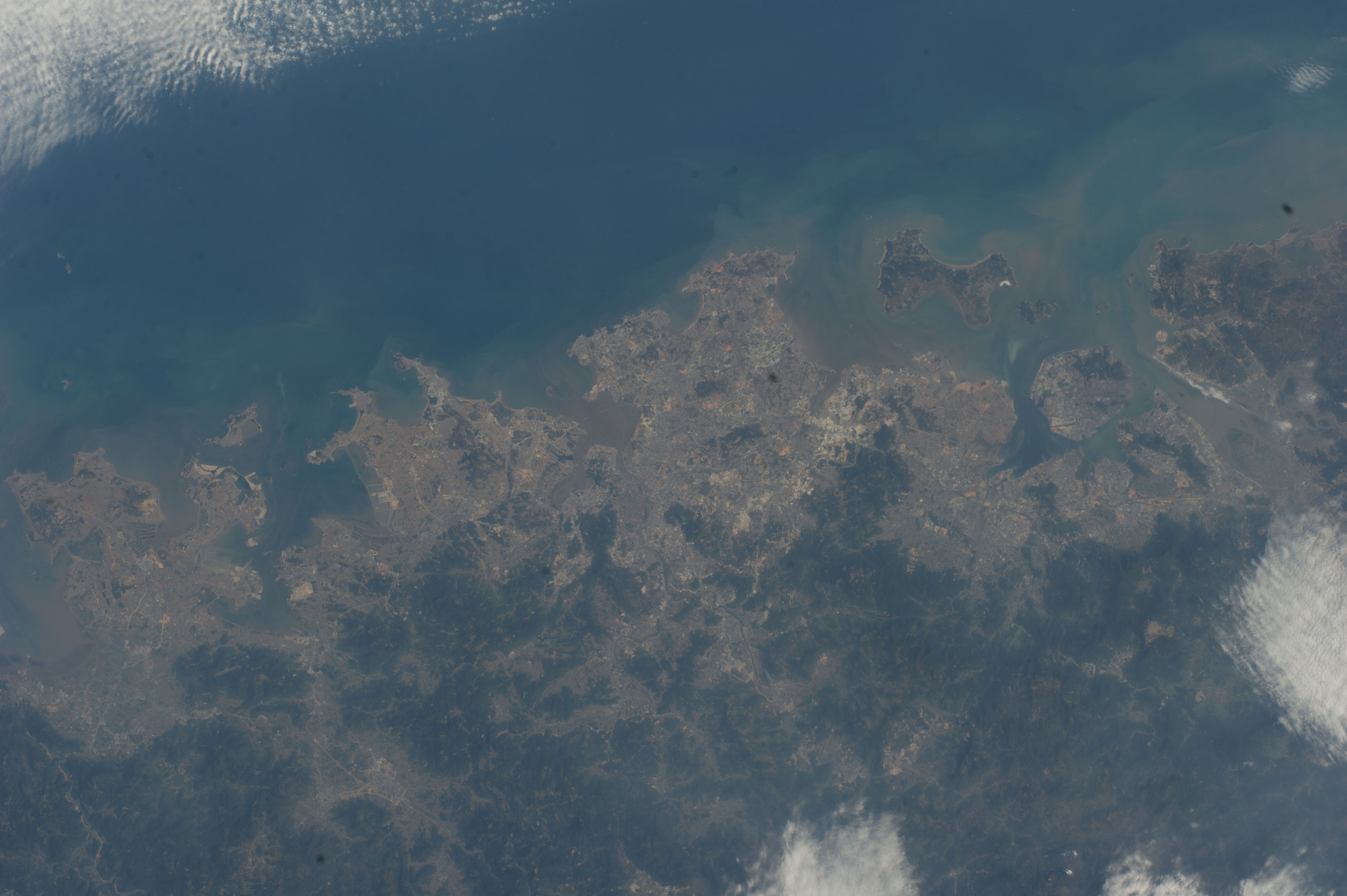
- The sinuous Fujian coastline shaped by the Zhejiang–Fujian Hills

Highest point
- Peak: Mount Huanggang, at the border between Wuyishan, Fujian and Yanshan, Jiangxi
- Elevation: 2,157 m (7,077 ft)

Naming
- Native name: 浙闽丘陵
- English translation: Zhejiang Fujian Mounds

Geography
- Location: Mostly in Zhejiang, Fujian and eastern Guangdong
- Country: China
- Subdivision(s): Tianmu Mountains, Wuyi Mountains, Xianxia Mountains, Kuocang Mountains, Yandang Mountains, Tiantai Mountains, Kuaiji Mountains and Daiyun Mountains
- Parent range: Southeast Hills

Geology
- Mountain type: Mountain range

The Zhejiang–Fujian Hills (Chinese: 浙闽丘陵), also known as the Fujian–Zhejiang Hills (Chinese: 闽浙丘陵), is a mountainous area in southeastern China and part of the wider Southeast Hills. It extend south of Hangzhou in Zhejiang, cover the whole of Fujian and reach into eastern Guangdong. The terrain consists largely of hills and low mountains of 200–1,000 m (660–3,280 ft) above sea level, although some peaks rise beyond 1,500 m (4,900 ft).

The principal mountain ranges include the Tianmu Mountains, Wuyi Mountains, Xianxia Mountains, Kuocang Mountains, Yandang Mountains, Tiantai Mountains, Kuaiji Mountains and Daiyun Mountains, most of which trend from northeast to southwest. The region also contains intermontane basins, such as the Jinhua–Quzhou Basin, and estuarine plains including the Fuzhou Plain.

== Geography ==
The Zhejiang–Fujian Hills consist of several parallel mountain belts that run from north east to south west and lie broadly parallel to the coastline. The westernmost belt centres on the Wuyi Mountains, where the average elevation is about 1,000 m (3,300 ft) and many summits exceed 1,500 m (4,900 ft). Ancient metamorphic rocks dominate the massif. A second belt to the east includes, from north to south, the Tiantai Mountains, Kuocang Mountains, Donggong Mountains, Jiufeng Mountains and Daiyun Mountains, with elevations generally around 800 m (2,600 ft). The highest peak of the Donggong Mountains, Baishanzu, reaches 1,857 m (6,093 ft).

Igneous hills form the core of the region. Extensive rhyolite outcrops give rise to rolling low mountains and high hills, and rivers carve deeply into the terrain, leaving sheer cliffs and steep scarps. The Kuocang Mountains, Yandang Mountains, Daiyun Mountains and Boping Ridge exemplify this landscape. Granite becomes more prominent near the Wuyi Mountains. Intense weathering produces thick weathering mantles and widespread lateritic soils, while rainfall strips fine materials from slopes and exposes rounded corestones and accumulations of large boulders, as seen around Hetian in Changting. Around Xiamen, stronger humid tropical weathering shapes granite tors and rock hills with concentrated boulders and caves, exemplified by Sunlight Rock on Gulangyu Island and Wanshi Rock in Xiamen.

Red basins occur widely within the hills. Tectonic subsidence first created the basin frameworks and accommodation space, after which coarse clastic sediments filled them and laid the foundation for Danxia landforms. These basins often align in a bead like pattern along structural belts, with Shanghang, Liancheng, Yong'an, Shaxian and Jian'ou forming a concentrated zone, and similar basins appearing in Jianning, Taining and Wuyishan. Ancient river valleys established these corridors, and modern rivers later reoccupied and reshaped them, depositing limited areas of alluvial flatland within the basins. Danxia cliffs and peak clusters commonly develop in these settings. The Danxia landforms of the Wuyi Mountains and the square topped Fangyan in Yongkang, with its steep sides and relatively flat summit, both result from this process.

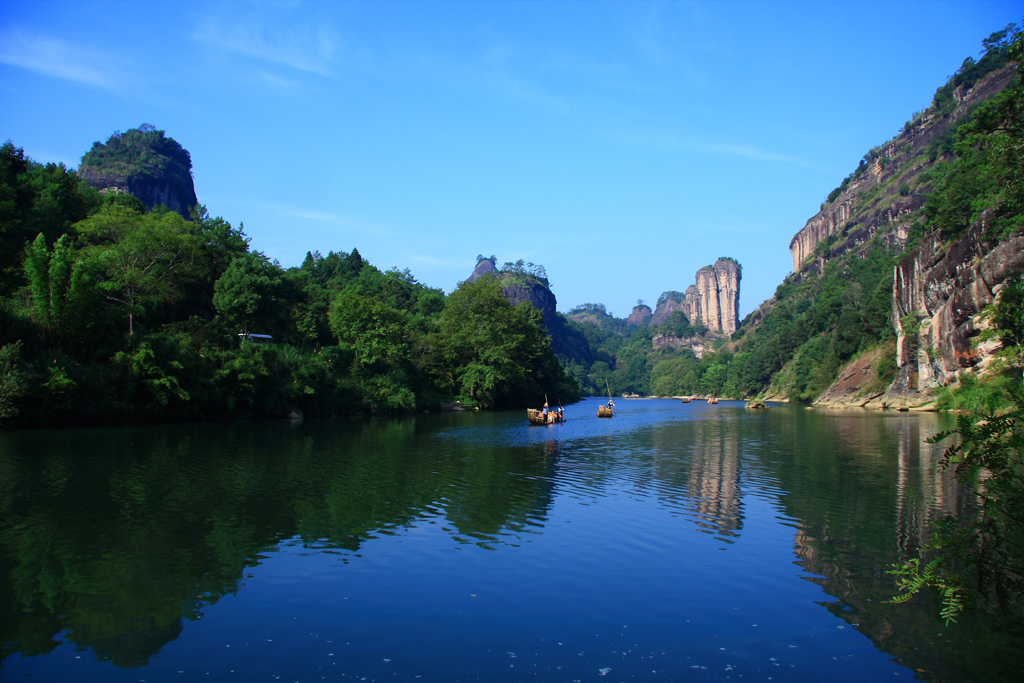
Wuyi Mountains

Most major rivers cut across the mountain belts and flow eastwards to the sea, forming gorges. Tributaries tend to follow the structural grain of the ridges and then join the main streams at near right angles, so tributary valleys often appear broader than the trunk valleys. In northeastern Guangdong, river systems generally run north to south, which differs from patterns in parts of Fujian. Rivers create valley basins and wide valleys through sustained lateral erosion and deposition, and broader valley units occur especially in faulted zones in the western hills. The upper Min River and its tributaries continually reshape valley floors through transport and sedimentation, producing terraces, plains and sandbars around the Shaowu Basin, Jian'ou and the areas of Jianyang and Wuyishan. A warm and humid climate accelerates weathering and lateritisation, stabilises terrace surfaces and encourages their conversion into paddy fields, embedding strips and patches of cultivated land within the undulating hill country.

Along the coast, many hills meet the sea directly. Waves erode exposed headlands, while quieter waters in bays and estuaries favour sediment deposition. Rivers deliver sediment that builds coastal plains and small deltas. Because most rivers enter the sea independently, they divide the plains into separate units, and faults often accentuate the boundary between hills and plains. The plains of Xinchang and Shengzhou along the Cao'e River, the Huangyan–Wenling Plain on the lower Ling River, the Ou River estuary in Wenzhou, and the Zhangzhou, Quanzhou, Xinghua and Fuzhou plains in Fujian are estuaries formed by fluvial deposition.

== Geology ==
The belt from Xiangshan Harbour southwards to Haifeng is often referred to as the Zhejiang–Fujian Pacific fold belt. Structurally, this zone trends from north east to south west and runs broadly parallel to the coastline. Tectonic compression and repeated faulting have fragmented the terrain into a mosaic of dissected hills and mountains, with granite and rhyolite commonly forming prominent ridges, often in synclinal positions. Variations in lithology produce clear contrasts in relief. The Daiyun Mountains exemplify granite uplands and rise to 1,550 m (5,090 ft), whereas areas underlain by softer sedimentary rocks develop into lower hills.

Faulting along the eastern flank of the Wuyi Mountains has generated high mountain blocks and deep gorges, while the hilly regions of Guangze, Shaowu, Jian'ou and Youxi extend further east. The western Wuyi Mountains form the watershed between Fujian and Jiangxi. Archaean gneiss and other ancient strata constitute the basement and are intruded by extensive granite bodies. In the eastern part of the belt, Jurassic, Cretaceous and early Tertiary red beds are well developed, together with widespread granite, rhyolite and tuff.

Across Fujian and north eastern Guangdong, the land surface generally declines from west to east. Sandstone strata of Cretaceous and early Tertiary age that underwent little folding were later deeply incised by river erosion, producing the present pattern of parallel valleys and aligned ridges. Along the eastern seaboard, rocky shores dominate and the coastline is markedly indented, with numerous headlands, bays, deltas and islands. Many islands and embayments originated from the submergence of parts of the former hill country during relatively recent geological periods. Among the offshore islands, the Zhoushan Archipelago is the most extensive, and Xiangshan Harbour, Sanmen Bay and Sansha Bay are representative coastal embayments.

== Resources ==
Evergreen broadleaved forests are widely distributed across the region, with substantial tracts of primary forest preserved alongside valuable wildlife resources. Common economic crops include citrus, oil tea camellia and tung oil tree. The coastline is dotted with numerous good natural harbours, and fisheries are comparatively well developed.
