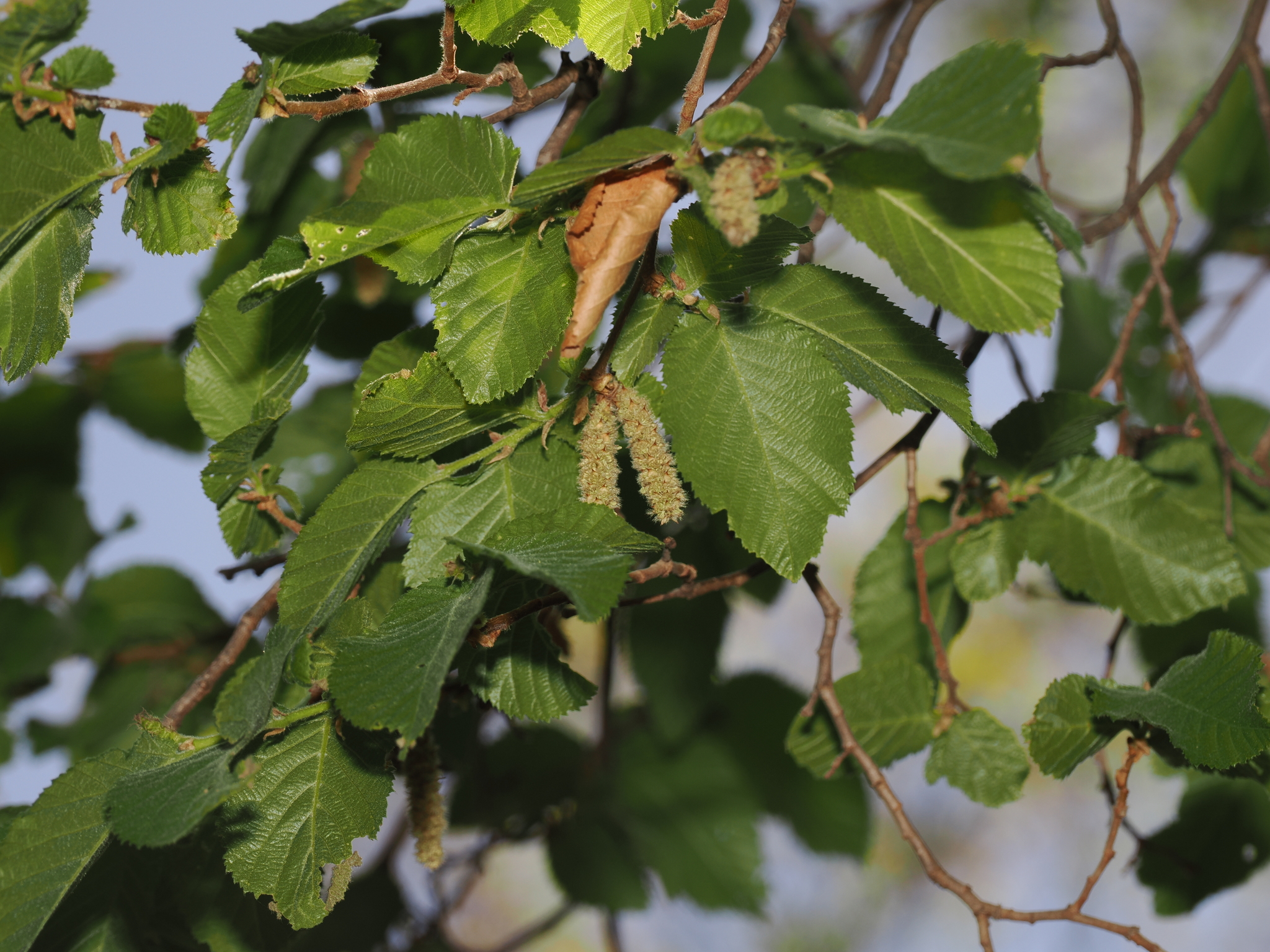

Conservation status
- Critically Endangered (IUCN 3.1)

Scientific classification
- Kingdom: Plantae
- Clade: Embryophytes
- Clade: Tracheophytes
- Clade: Spermatophytes
- Clade: Angiosperms
- Clade: Eudicots
- Clade: Rosids
- Order: Fagales
- Family: Betulaceae
- Genus: Ostrya
- Species: O. chisosensis

Binomial name
- Ostrya chisosensis Correll

Synonyms
- Ostrya knowltonii subsp. chisosensis (Correll) A.E. Murray; Ostrya knowltonii var. chisosensis (Correll) A.E. Murray

= Ostrya chisosensis =

Big Bend hop-hornbeam

Species of flowering plant

Ostrya chisosensis, common name Big Bend hop-hornbeam or Chisos hop-hornbeam, is a plant species endemic to Texas. It is known only from the Chisos Mountains inside Big Bend National Park, in Brewster County, although related populations in northern Chihuahua have not been studied in detail and may be the same species. It grows along streambanks and on the walls of canyons.

Ostrya chisosensis is a tree up to 12 m tall. Bark splits into narrow vertical strips. Leaves broadly elliptic to lanceolate, lacking glandular hairs. Staminate (male) catkins are 3.5–5 cm long.
