= Paramartyria immaculatella =

Scientific classification
- Kingdom: Animalia
- Phylum: Arthropoda
- Class: Insecta
- Order: Lepidoptera
- Family: Micropterigidae
- Genus: Paramartyria
- Species: P. immaculatella

Binomial name
- Paramartyria immaculatella Issiki, 1931

Species of moth

Paramartyria immaculatella is a species of moth belonging to the family Micropterigidae. It was described by Syuti Issiki in 1931. It is known from Japan (Honshu, Shikoku and Kyushu).

The wingspan is 9–10 mm, while the length of the forewings is 4.1–4.9 mm for males and 4.3–4.9 mm for females.
