= Arachniodes squamulosa =

Conservation status
- Endangered (IUCN 3.1)

Scientific classification
- Kingdom: Plantae
- Clade: Tracheophytes
- Division: Polypodiophyta
- Class: Polypodiopsida
- Order: Polypodiales
- Suborder: Polypodiineae
- Family: Dryopteridaceae
- Genus: Arachniodes
- Species: A. squamulosa

Binomial name
- Arachniodes squamulosa R.C.Moran & B.Øllg.

Species of fern

Arachniodes squamulosa is a species of fern in the family Dryopteridaceae. It is endemic to Ecuador. Its natural habitats are subtropical or tropical moist lowland forests and subtropical or tropical moist montane forests. It is threatened by habitat loss.
