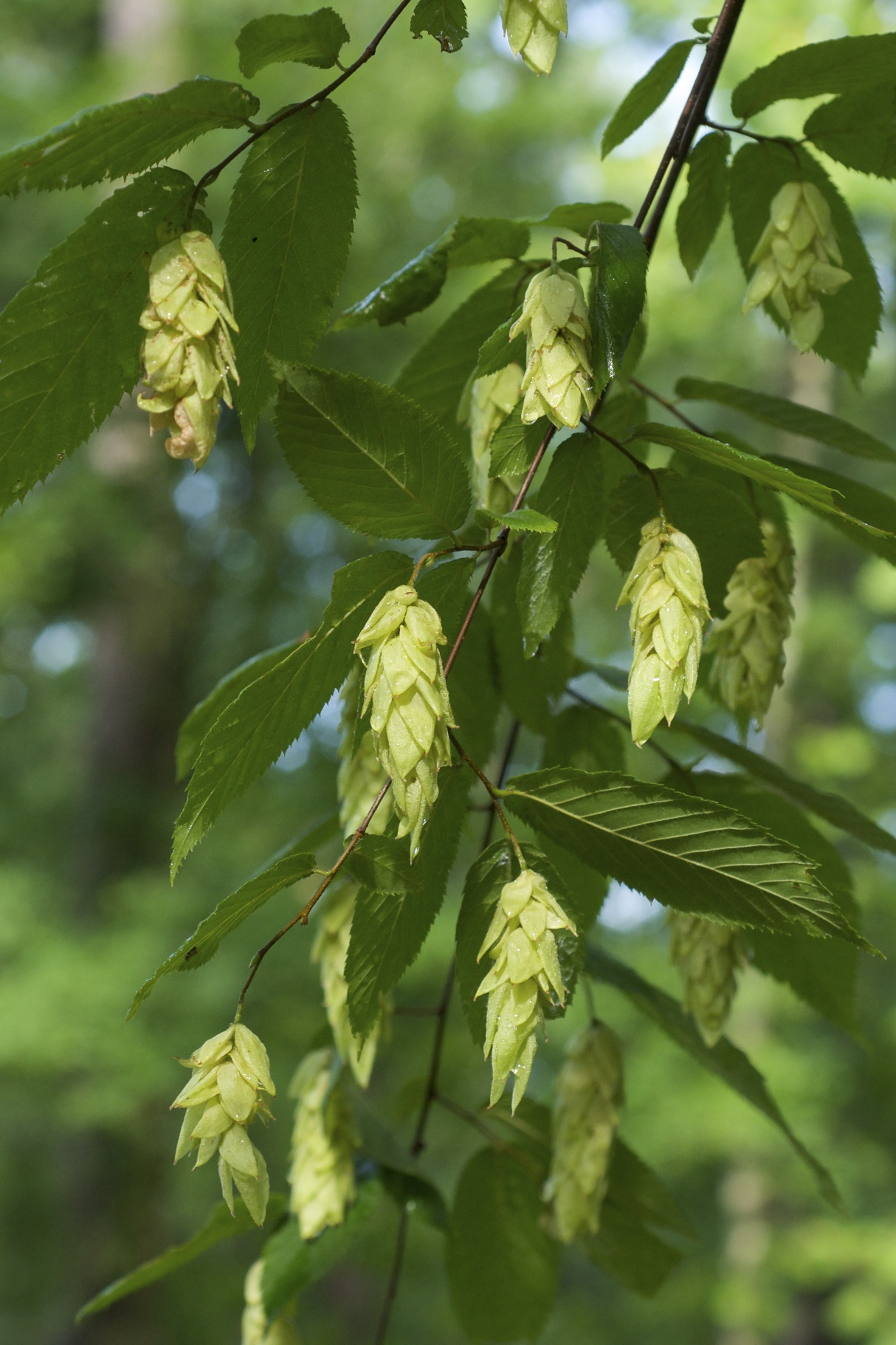
- A hophornbeam branch with the characteristic hop-resembling fruits in early summer

Conservation status
- Least Concern (IUCN 3.1)

Scientific classification
- Kingdom: Plantae
- Clade: Embryophytes
- Clade: Tracheophytes
- Clade: Angiosperms
- Clade: Eudicots
- Clade: Rosids
- Order: Fagales
- Family: Betulaceae
- Genus: Ostrya
- Species: O. virginiana

Binomial name
- Ostrya virginiana (Mill.) K.Koch

Subspecies
- Ostrya virginiana subsp. guatemalensis (H.J.P.Winkl.) A.E.Murray; Ostrya virginiana subsp. virginiana
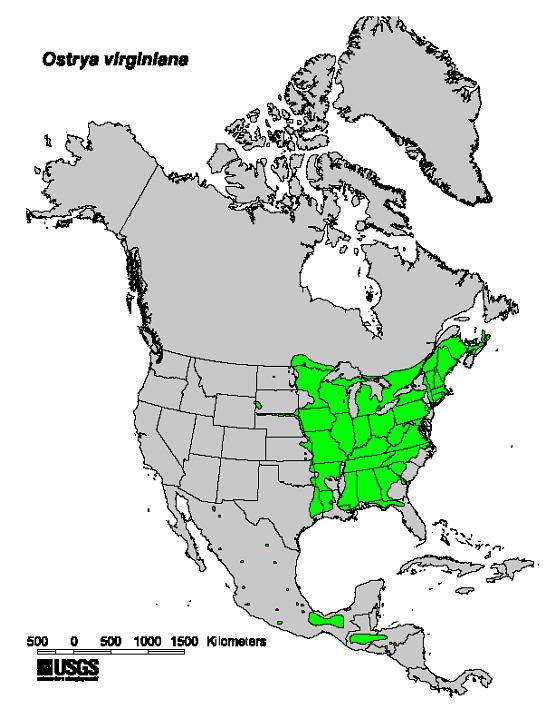
- Generalized native range

Synonyms
- Carpinus virginiana Mill.; Ostrya italica subsp. virginiana (Mill.) H.J.P.Winkl.; Zugilus virginica Raf.; synonyms of subsp. guatemalensis: Ostrya guatemalensis (H.J.P.Winkl.) Rose; Ostrya italica var. guatemalensis H.J.P.Winkl.; Ostrya mexicana Rose; Ostrya virginiana var. guatemalensis (H.J.P.Winkl.) J.F.Macbr.; Ulmus lesueurii Standl.; synonyms of subsp. virginiana: Carpinus ostrya var. americana Michx.; Carpinus triflora Moench; Carpinus virginica Münchh.; Ostrya americana F.Michx.; Ostrya baileyi Rose; Ostrya carpinifolia var. virginica (Münchh.) Fliche; Ostrya ostrya MacMill.; Ostrya virginiana var. glandulosa (Spach) Sarg.; Ostrya virginiana f. glandulosa (Spach) J.F.Macbr.; Ostrya virginiana var. lasia Fernald; Ostrya virginica (Münchh.) Willd.; Ostrya vulgaris var. eglandulosa Spach; Ostrya vulgaris var. glandulosa Spach

= Ostrya virginiana =

American hophornbeam

Species of tree

Ostrya virginiana, the American hophornbeam, is a species of Ostrya native to eastern North America, from Nova Scotia west to southern Manitoba and eastern Wyoming, southeast to northern Florida and southwest to eastern Texas. Populations from Mexico and Central America are also regarded as the same species, although some authors prefer to separate them as a distinct species, Ostrya guatemalensis. Other names include eastern hophornbeam, hardhack (in New England), ironwood (in Ontario), and leverwood.

== Description ==
Ostrya virginiana (American hophornbeam) is a small deciduous understory tree growing to 18 m (59 ft) tall and 20–50 centimetres (8–20 in) trunk diameter. The bark is brown to gray-brown, with narrow shaggy plates flaking off, while younger twigs and branches are smoother and gray, with small lenticels. Very young twigs are sparsely fuzzy to thickly hairy; the hairs (trichomes) drop off by the next year.

The leaves are ovoid-acute, 5–13 cm (2–5 in) long and 4–6 cm (1 1/2–2 1/4 in) broad, pinnately veined, with a doubly serrated margin. The upper surface is mostly hairless, while the lower surface is sparsely to moderately fuzzy (rarely densely hairy).

The flowers are catkins (spikes) produced in early spring at the same time as the new leaves appear. The staminate (male) catkins are 2–5 cm (3/4–2 in) long, and arranged in groups of 1–4. The pistillate (female) catkins are 8–15 mm (5/16–19/32 in) long, containing 10–30 flowers each.

Pollinated female flowers develop into small nutlets 3–5 mm (1/8–3/16 in) long fully enclosed in a papery sac-shaped involucre 10–18 mm (3/8–11/16 in) long and 8–10 mm (5/16–3/8 in) wide. The involucre changes from greenish-white to dull brown as the fruit matures.

American hophornbeam is similar to its close relative American hornbeam (Carpinus caroliniana), which can be distinguished by its smooth bark and nutlets enclosed in open, three-lobed bracts.

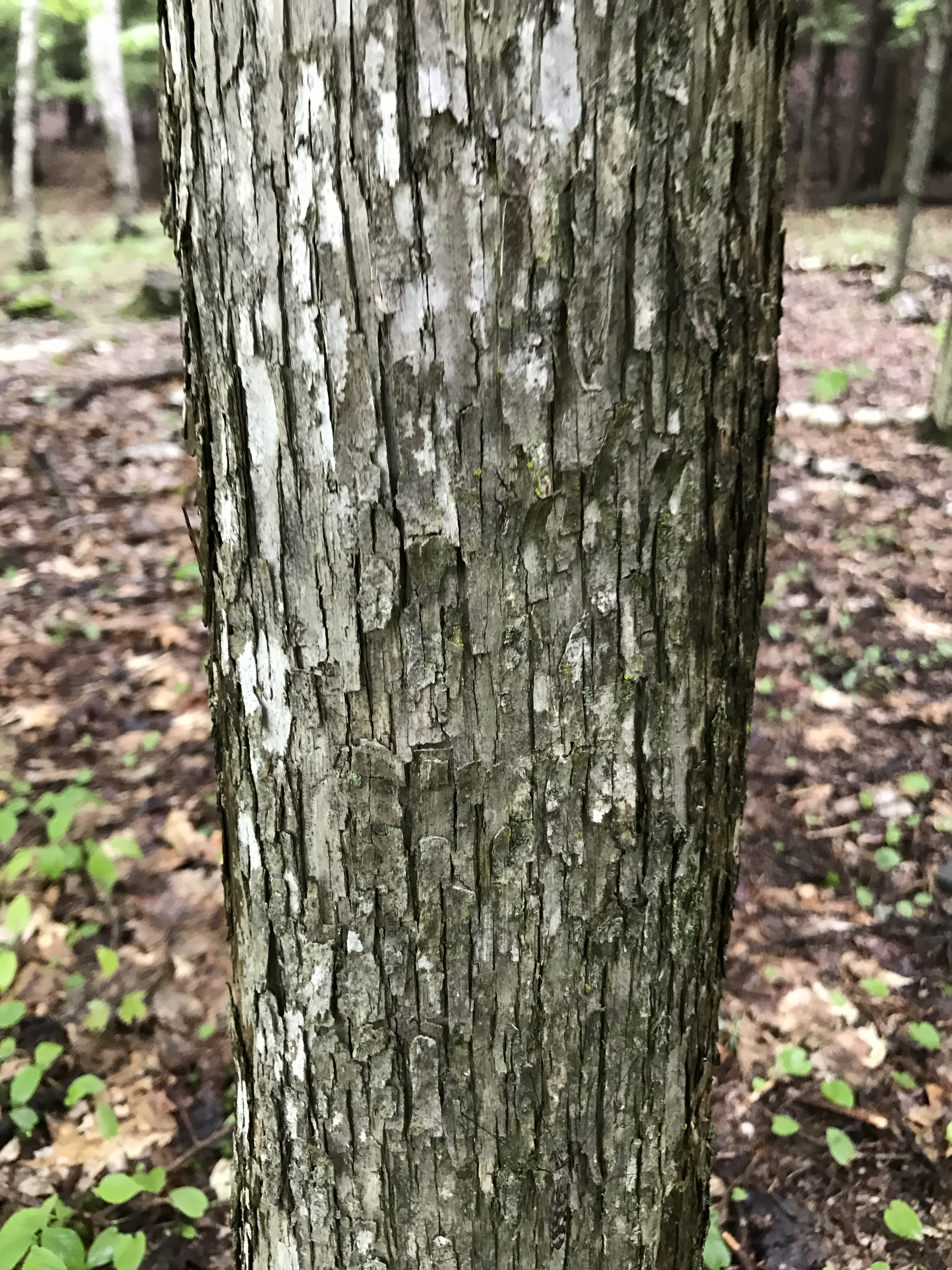
Bark of a mature tree

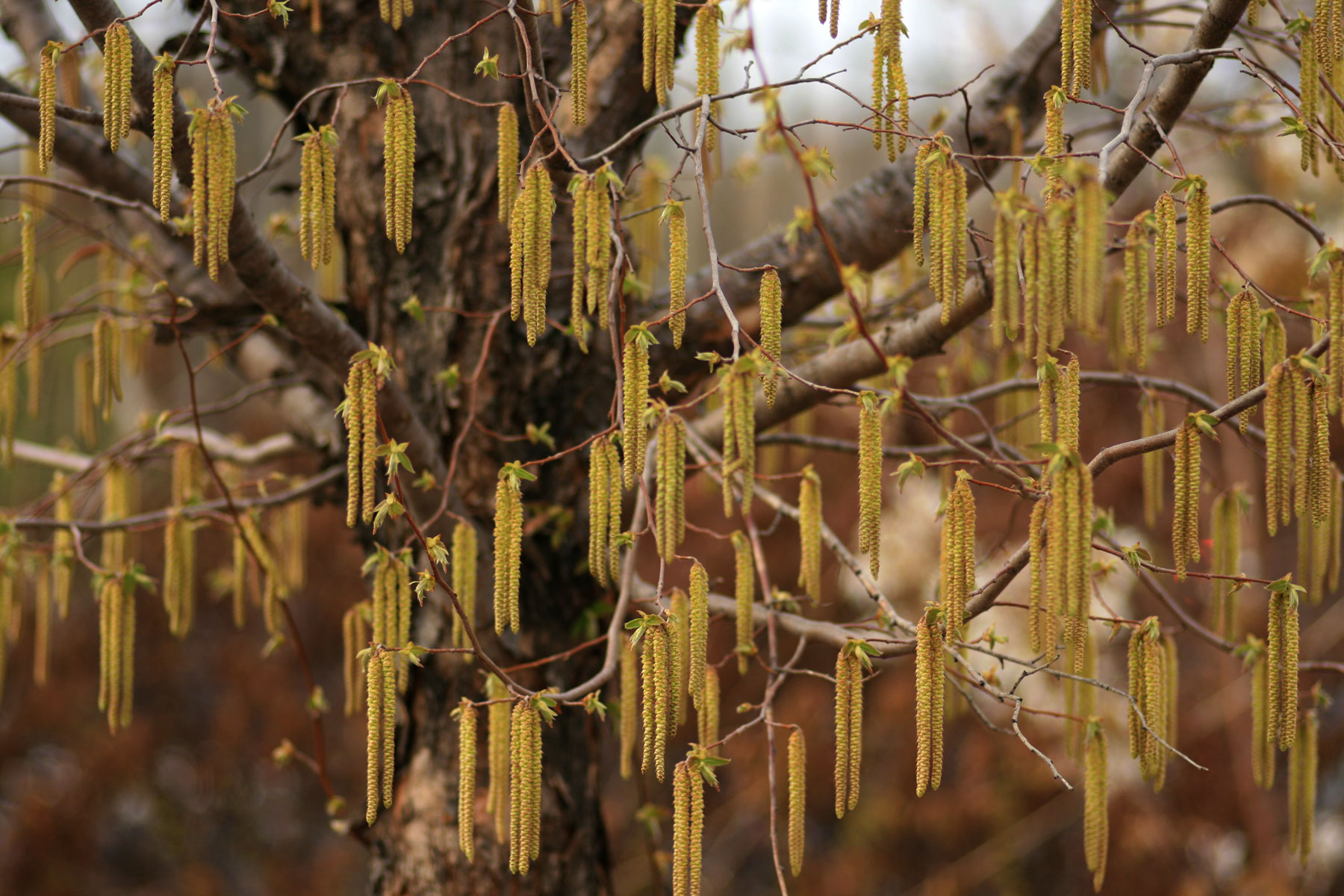
Male catkins hanging from the branches in spring (United States Botanic Garden)

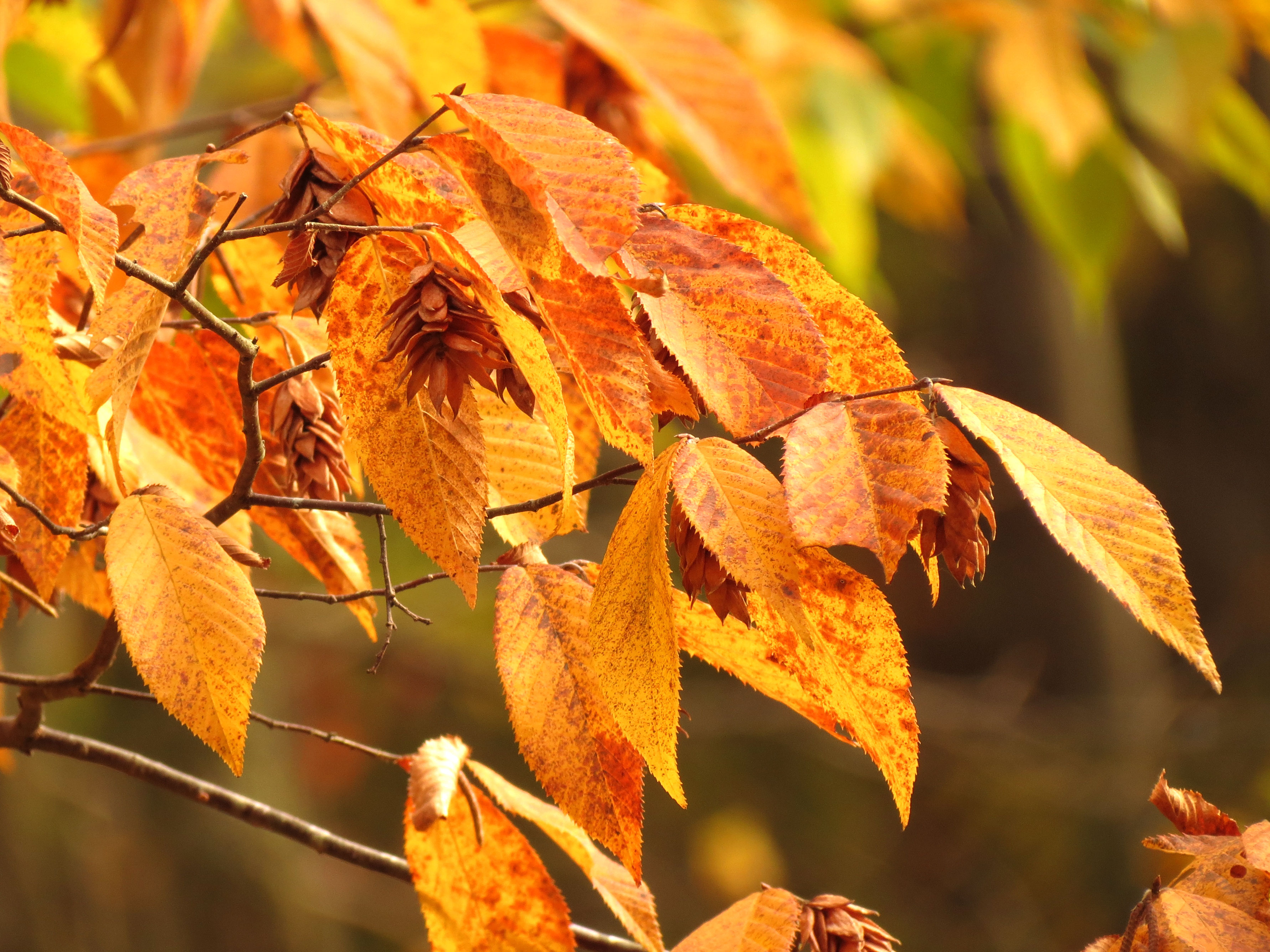
Leaf color in autumn

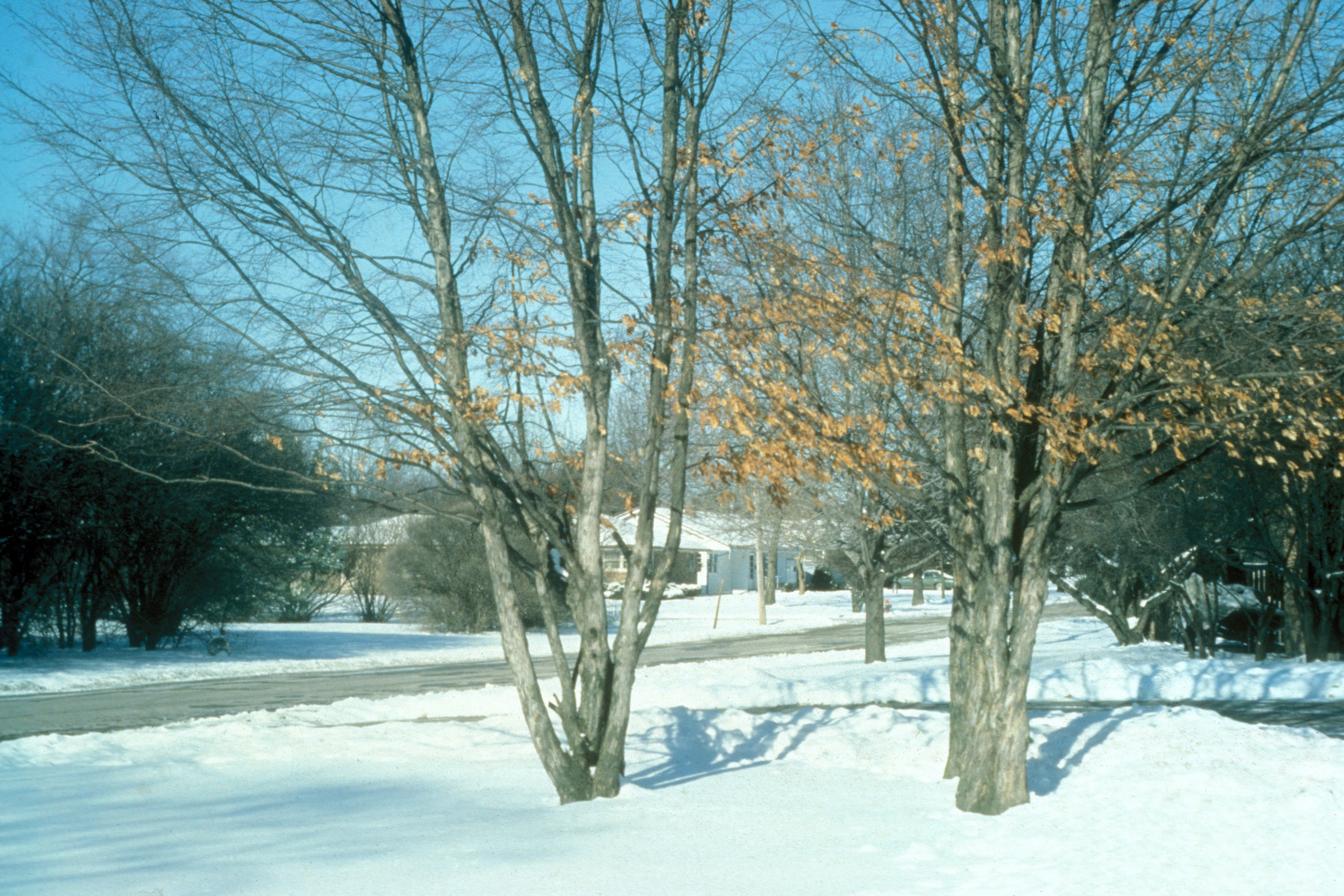
Two trees in winter with some dried leaves still hanging on their branches (marcescence)

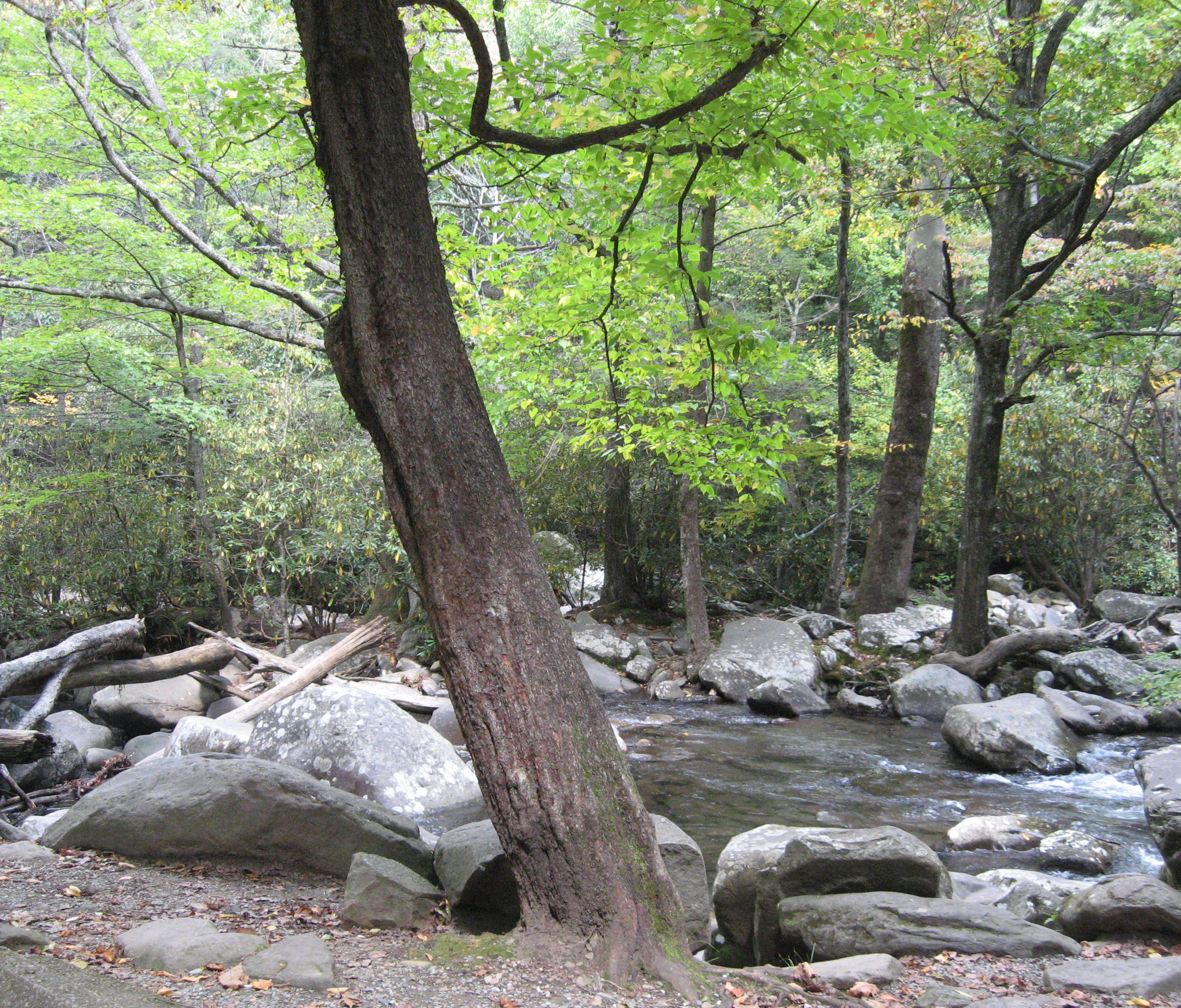
An exceptionally large trunk

== Subdivisions ==
There are two subspecies:

- Ostrya virginiana subsp. guatemalensis (H.J.P.Winkl.) A.E.Murray – central and southern Mexico, Guatemala, Honduras, El Salvador
- Ostrya virginiana subsp. virginiana – eastern half of United States, eastern Canada

Populations along the Atlantic coast have slightly smaller leaves, and are sometimes separated as O. virginiana var. lasia Fernald.

== Habitat and ecology ==
In temperate areas of the US and Canada, Ostrya virginiana is found in lowland and foothill forests, where it is predominantly an understory tree.

In Mexico and Central America, Ostrya virginiana is found in cloud forests and humid portions of mid-elevation oak, pine–oak, and pine forests between 1200 and 2800 meters elevation.

The buds and catkins are important source of winter food for some birds, notably ruffed grouse (Bonasa umbellus). Additionally, the nutlets and buds are eaten by birds, deer, and rabbits.

== Uses ==
It is not typically grown as an ornamental plant and is sometimes used as a street tree.

Its wood is very resilient and is valued for making tool handles and fence posts.

Being a diffuse porous hardwood and having extremely high density and resistance to compression, it is an excellent material for the construction of wooden longbows.
