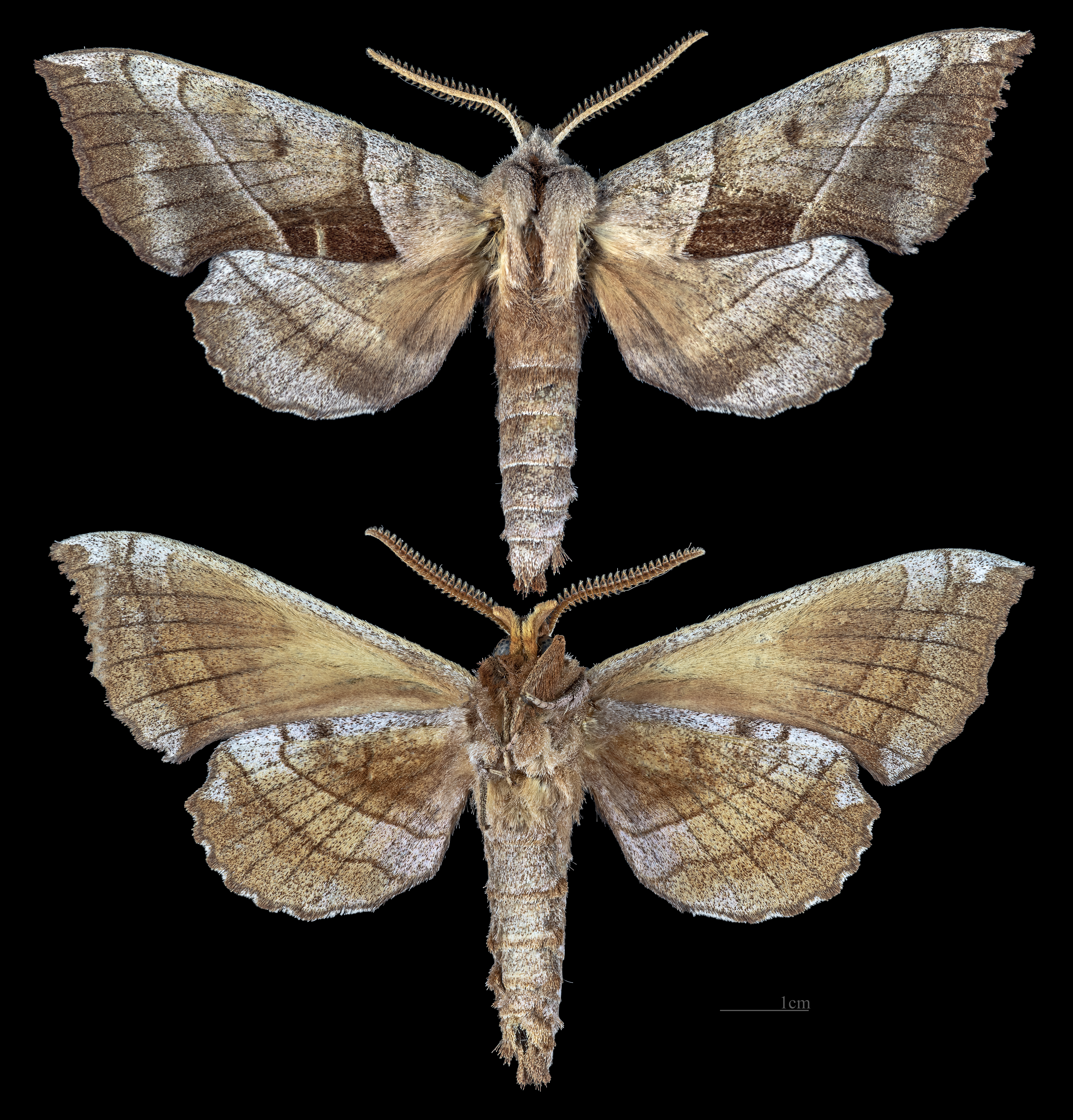

Conservation status
- Secure (NatureServe)

Scientific classification
- Kingdom: Animalia
- Phylum: Arthropoda
- Clade: Pancrustacea
- Class: Insecta
- Order: Lepidoptera
- Family: Sphingidae
- Tribe: Mimatini
- Genus: Amorpha; J. Hübner, 1809
- Species: A. juglandis

Binomial name
- Amorpha juglandis (J. E. Smith, 1797)

Synonyms
- Generic; Cressonia Grote & Robinson, 1865; Specific; Sphinx juglandis J. E. Smith, 1797; Cressonia juglandis (J.E. Smith, 1797); Laothoe juglandis (J.E. Smith, 1797); Sphinx instibilis Martyn, 1797; Cressonia hyperbola Slosson, 1890; Cressonia robinsonii Butler, 1876; Smerinthus pallens Strecker, 1873; Cressonia juglandis subsp. alpina Clark, 1927; Cressonia juglandis subsp. manitobae Clark, 1930

= Amorpha juglandis =

Walnut sphinx

Species of moth

Amorpha juglandis, the walnut sphinx, is the only species in the monotypic moth genus Amorpha, which is in the family Sphingidae, erected by Jacob Hübner in 1809. The species was first described by James Edward Smith in 1797.

== Distribution ==
It is native to North America, where it is distributed from the Atlantic Ocean to the Rocky Mountains in Canada and the United States.

== Description ==
The wingspan is 45–75 mm.

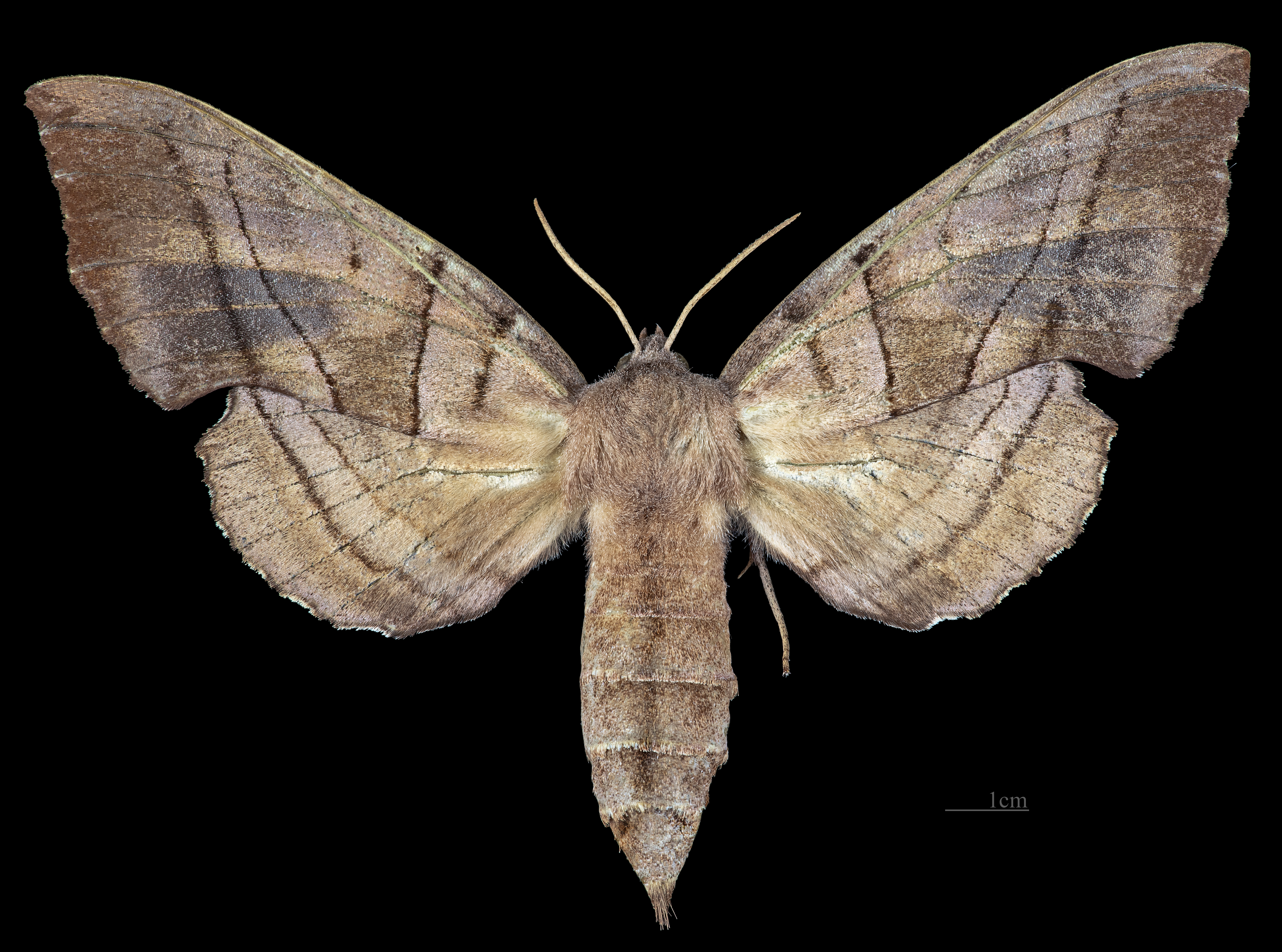
Female

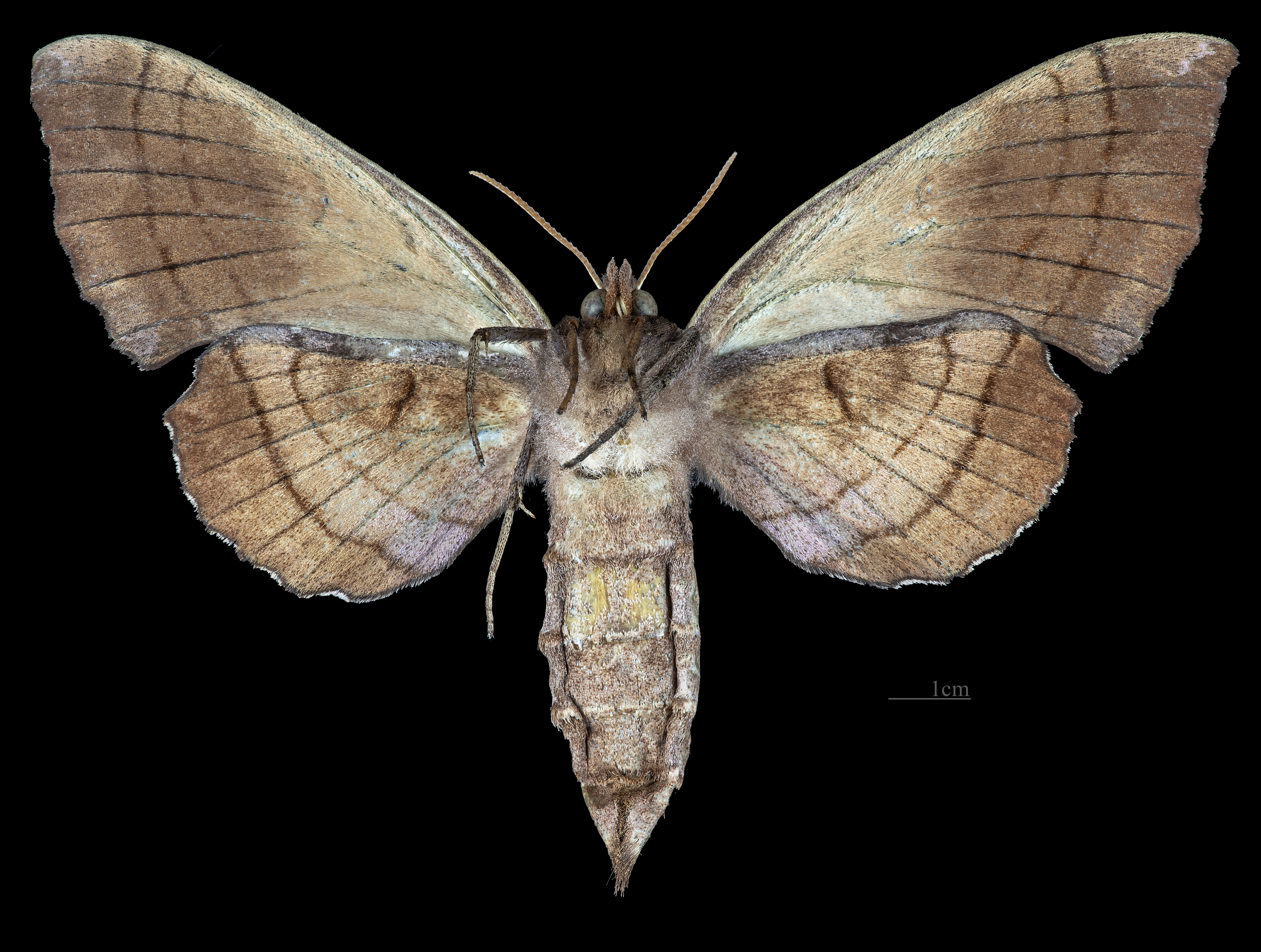
Female underside

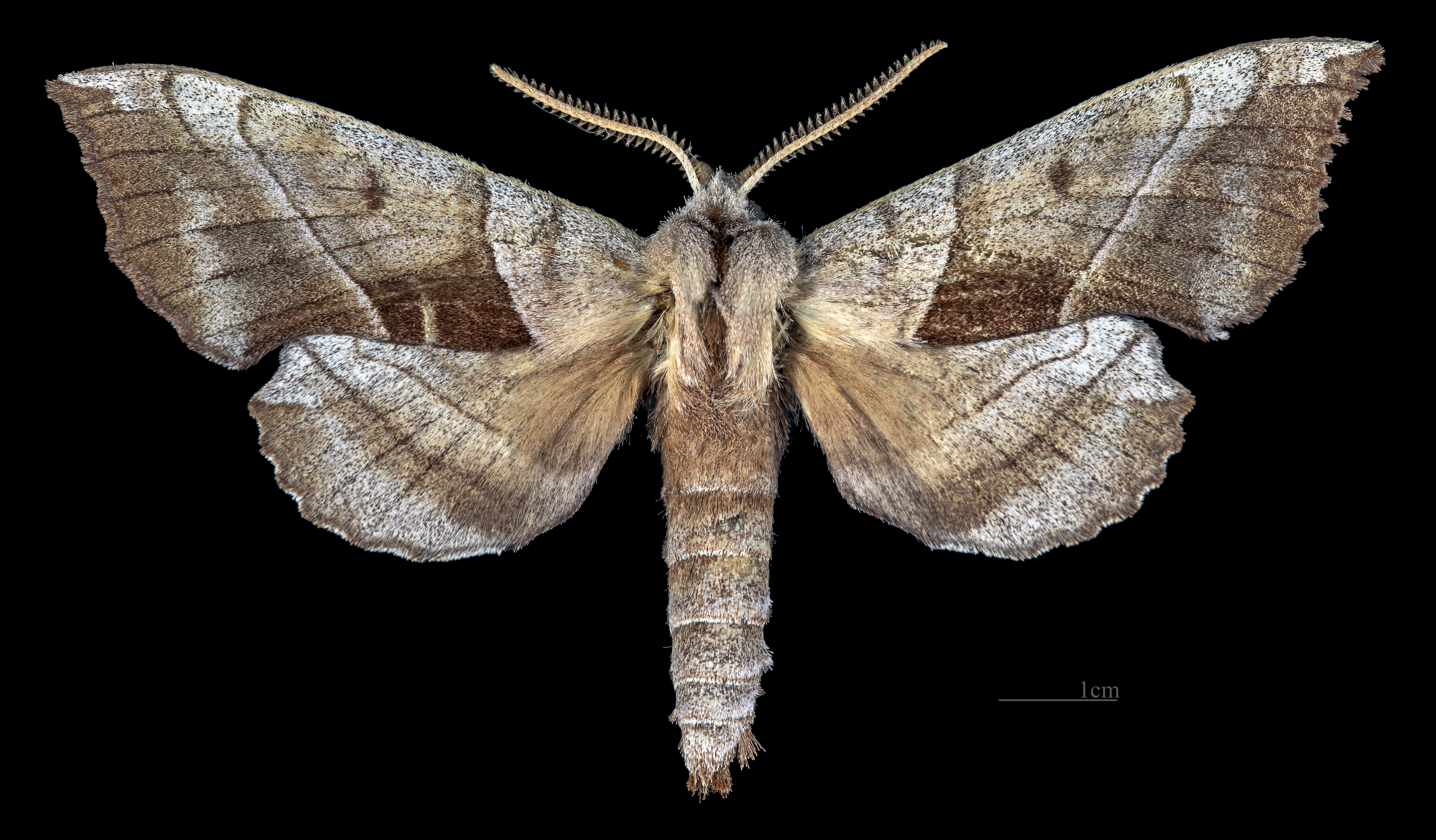
Male

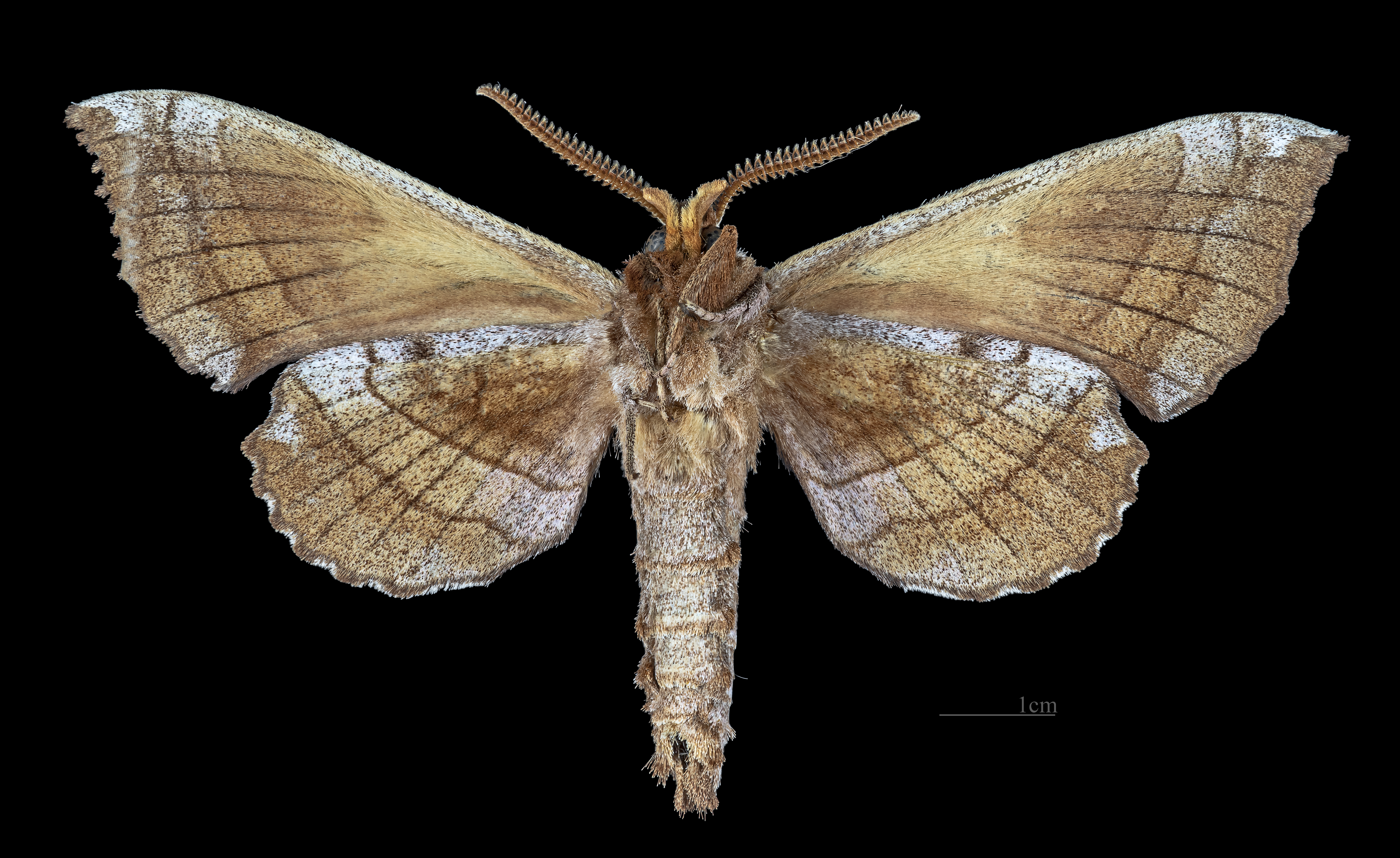
Male underside

== Biology ==
The adult moth is nocturnal, active mainly during the early hours of the night.

The caterpillar feeds on alder (Alnus), hickory (Carya), hazelnut (Corylus), beech (Fagus), walnut (Juglans), and hop-hornbeam (Ostrya) species. When attacked by a bird, the caterpillar produces a high-pitched whistle by expelling air from pairs of spiracles in its abdomen. This whistle is similar to the alarm signal produced by various bird species. One group of researchers in Montana hypothesized that this is a form of mimicry that functions as an antipredator adaptation to startle the bird, causing them to potentially reject the caterpillar.
