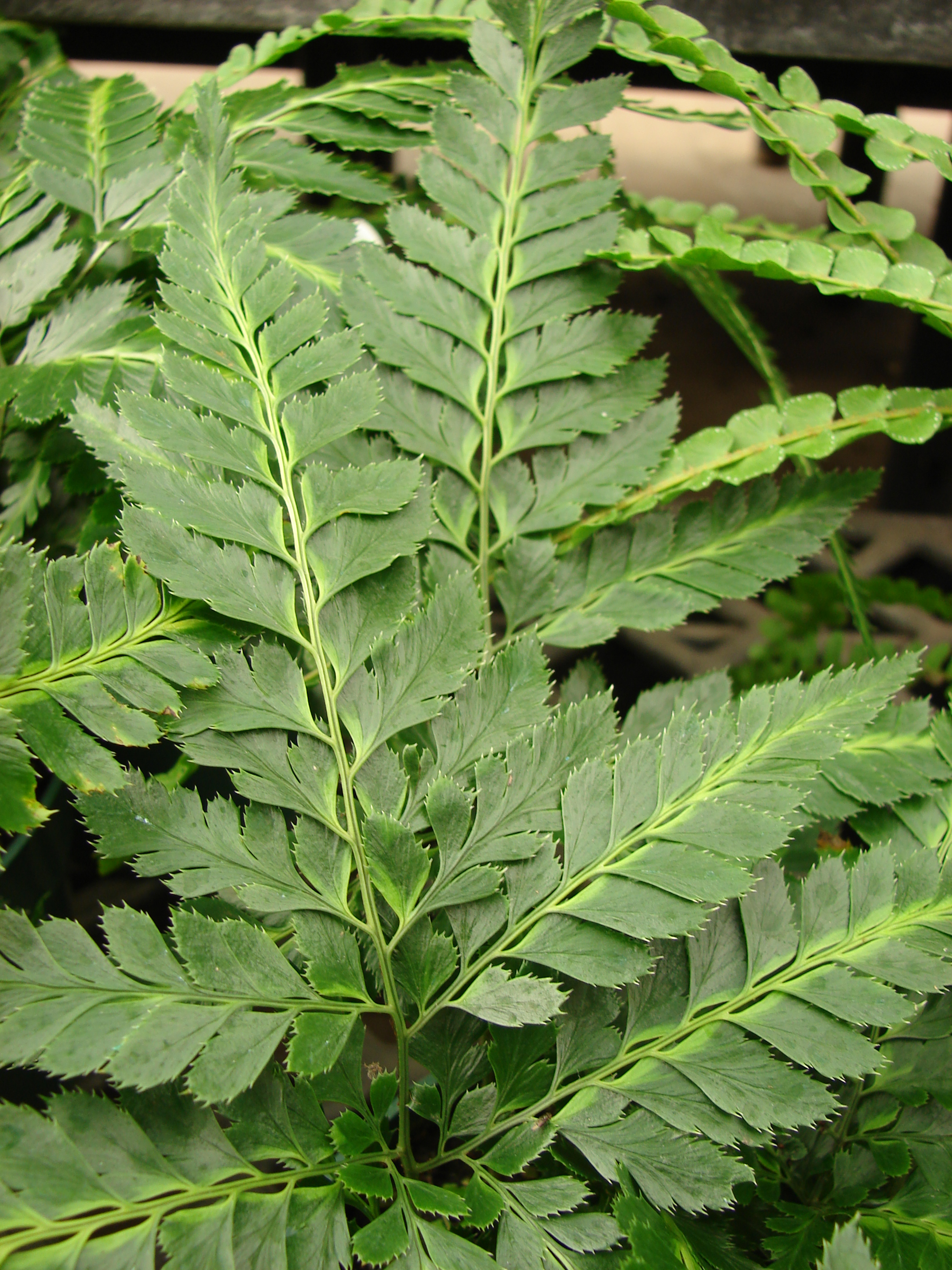
- Arachniodes simplicior

Scientific classification
- Kingdom: Plantae
- Clade: Tracheophytes
- Division: Polypodiophyta
- Class: Polypodiopsida
- Order: Polypodiales
- Suborder: Polypodiineae
- Family: Dryopteridaceae
- Subfamily: Dryopteridoideae
- Genus: Arachniodes; Blume

Synonyms
- Byrsopteris C.V.Morton; Leptorumohra (H.Ito) H.Ito; Lithostegia Ching; Phanerophlebiopsis Ching

= Arachniodes =

Genus of ferns

Arachniodes is a fern genus in the family Dryopteridaceae (wood ferns), subfamily Dryopteridoideae, in the Pteridophyte Phylogeny Group classification of 2016 (PPG I). A number of species in this genus are known as "holly ferns".

The genus Arachniodes was first published by Carl Ludwig von Blume in 1828, with the single Indonesian species Arachniodes aspidioides. The genus was not widely recognized until Mary Douglas Tindale transferred the two species (Byrsopteris amabilis and Byrsopteris aristata) into it in 1961.

== Species ==
The Pteridophyte Phylogeny Group classification of 2016 (PPG I) considers Arachniodes to have 60 species. As of January 2020, the Checklist of Ferns and Lycophytes of the World accepted 78 species:

- Arachniodes ailaoshanensis Ching
- Arachniodes amabilis (Blume) Tindale
- Arachniodes amoena (Ching) Ching
- Arachniodes aristata (G.Forst.) Tindale
- Arachniodes assamica (Kuhn) Ohwi
- Arachniodes bella (C.Chr.) Ching
- Arachniodes blinii (H.Lév.) Nakaike
- Arachniodes carvifolia (Kunze) Ching
- Arachniodes caudata Ching
- Arachniodes cavaleriei (Christ) Ohwi
- Arachniodes chinensis (Rosenst.) Ching
- Arachniodes coniifolia (T.Moore) Ching
- Arachniodes cornucervi (D.Don) Fraser-Jenk.
- Arachniodes daklakensis Li Bing Zhang, N.T.Lu & X.M.Zhou
- Arachniodes davalliaeformis (Christ) Nakaike
- Arachniodes denticulata (Sw.) Ching
- Arachniodes fengii Ching
- Arachniodes festina (Hance) Ching
- Arachniodes formosa (Fée) Ching
- Arachniodes formosissima (Goldm.) Nakaike
- Arachniodes gigantea Ching
- Arachniodes globisora (Hayata) Ching
- Arachniodes grossa (Tardieu & C.Chr.) Ching
- Arachniodes hainanensis (Ching) Ching
- Arachniodes haniffii (Holttum) Ching
- Arachniodes hehaii Li Bing Zhang, N.T.Lu & X.F.Gao
- Arachniodes hekiana Kurata
- Arachniodes henryi (Christ) Ching
- Arachniodes hiugana Sa. Kurata
- Arachniodes hunanensis Ching
- Arachniodes insularis W.H.Wagner
- Arachniodes japonica (Kurata) Nakaike
- Arachniodes jinpingensis Y.T.Hsieh
- Arachniodes leucostegioides (C.Chr.) Ching
- Arachniodes longicaudata Li Bing Zhang, N.T.Lu & Liang Zhang
- Arachniodes longipinna Ching
- Arachniodes microlepioides (C.Chr.) comb. ined.
- Arachniodes miqueliana (Maxim. ex Franch. & Sav.) Ohwi
- Arachniodes miyakei (H.Itô) Shimura ex Nakaike
- Arachniodes mutica (Franch. & Sav.) Ohwi
- Arachniodes neopodophylla (Ching) Nakaike
- Arachniodes nigrospinosa (Ching) Ching
- Arachniodes nipponica (Rosenst.) Ohwi
- Arachniodes oosorae H.Itô
- Arachniodes palmipes (Kunze) Fraser-Jenk.
- Arachniodes pseudoaristata (Tagawa) Ohwi
- Arachniodes pseudoassamica Ching
- Arachniodes pseudorepens Nakaike
- Arachniodes puncticulata (Alderw.) Ching
- Arachniodes quadripinnata (Hayata) Seriz.
- Arachniodes quangnamensis Li Bing Zhang, N.T.Lu & Liang Zhang
- Arachniodes repens Kurata
- Arachniodes rhomboidea (Schott) Ching
- Arachniodes rigidissima (Hook.) Ching
- Arachniodes sarasiniorum (Christ) Nakaike
- Arachniodes simplicior (Makino) Ohwi
- Arachniodes simulans (Ching) Ching
- Arachniodes sinomiqueliana (Ching) Ohwi
- Arachniodes sinorhomboidea Ching
- Arachniodes sledgei Fraser-Jenk.
- Arachniodes spectabilis (Ching) Ching
- Arachniodes squamulosa R.C.Moran & B. Øllg.
- Arachniodes standishii (T.Moore) Ohwi
- Arachniodes subamabilis Kurata
- Arachniodes superba Fraser-Jenk.
- Arachniodes tomitae Sa. Kurata
- Arachniodes tonkinensis (Ching) Ching
- Arachniodes tripinnata (Goldm.) Sledge
- Arachniodes tsiangiana (Ching) Nakaike
- Arachniodes webbiana (A.Braun) Schelpe
- Arachniodes wulingshanensis S.F.Wu
- Arachniodes yakusimensis (H.Itô) Nakaike
- Arachniodes ziyunshanensis Y.T.Xie

Some hybrids were also accepted:

- Arachniodes × azuminoensis Fujiw., Y.Matsuda, Yu. Abe & Otsuka
- Arachniodes × chibaensis Yashiro
- Arachniodes × clivorum Kurata
- Arachniodes × ikeminensis Seriz.
- Arachniodes × kenzo-satakei (Kurata) Kurata
- Arachniodes × kurosawae Shimura & Kurata
- Arachniodes × masakii Kurata
- Arachniodes × minamitanii Sa. Kurata
- Arachniodes × mirabilis Sa. Kurata
- Arachniodes × mitsuyoshiana Sa. Kurata
- Arachniodes × pseudohekiana Kurata
- Arachniodes × respiciens Sa. Kurata
- Arachniodes × sahashii Fraser-Jenk. & Kandel
- Arachniodes × sasamotoi Kurata
- Arachniodes × takayamensis Seriz.
