= Kuaiji Mountains =

Mountain range in Zhejiang, China

The Kuaiji Mountains (traditional Chinese: 會稽山; simplified Chinese: 会稽山; pinyin: Kuàijī Shān or Guìjī Shān), formerly romanized as the K'uai-chi Mountains, are a 100-kilometer (62 mi) long mountain range in China's Zhejiang province and part of wider Zhejiang–Fujian Hills. They are named for Mount Kuaiji (also Kuàijī Shān in Chinese), the peak just southeast of Shaoxing which is now known as Mount Xianglu. Xianglu is the highest peak of the range, with an elevation of 354.7 meters (1,164 ft).

== See also ==
- Mount Xianglu
