= Mount Xianglu =

Mountain in Zhejiang, China

- Location within China

Highest point
- Elevation: 354 m (1,161 ft)
- Listing: List of mountains in China
- Coordinates: 29°56′50″N 120°36′30″E

Geography
- Location: Zhejiang, China

Mount Xianglu (simplified Chinese: 香炉峰; traditional Chinese: 香爐峰; pinyin: Xiānglú Fēng; lit. 'Censer Peak"/"Incense Burner Peak') is a mountain near Shaoxing, Zhejiang, China. Its summit has an elevation of 354 metres (1,161 ft).

== History ==
Its historic name was Mount Kuaiji (会稽山; 會稽山; Kuàijī Shān), formerly romanized as Mount K'uai-chi. (Note: Other variant romanizations include Kuaijishan, Kuaiji Shan, Kuai Ji Shan, K'uai-chi-shan, Kuai-chi-shan, K'uai-chi Shan, Kuai-chi Shan, K'uai Chi Shan, Kuai Chi Shan, Mt. Kuai Ji, Mt. Kuai-chi, Mt. K'uai Chi, Mt. Kuai Chi, Kuaiji Mountain, K'uai-chi Mtn., Kuai-chi Mtn., K'uai Chi Mtn., and Kuai Chi Mtn.) (Note: It is also encountered as Mount Guiji, Mount Gui Ji, and Mount Kuei-chi, among others, owing to mistaken transcriptions of the initial characters' usual pronunciation.) It was an important site for ancient China's Yue civilization and was legendarily connected with the Xia dynasty's Yu the Great, who was said to have convened a gathering of his nobles there and to have died at the spot during a hunting trip. The mountain continued to preserve the Old Yue language even after its conquest by the Qin dynasty in 222 BC. It gave its name to the Kuaiji Mountains to its south, as well as China's former Kuaiji Commandery and (by extension) historical names for Suzhou and Shaoxing. It was also the site of the AD 353 Orchid Pavilion Gathering which produced the Lantingji Xu.

The present site of Yu's mausoleum to the north of the peak dates to the 6th century, but sacrifices in his honor have been offered in the area since at least the reign of Shi Huangdi and it featured in Sima Qian's pilgrimage around the historical sites of China prior to his composition of the Records of the Grand Historian.

== See also ==
- Kuaiji Mountains
