= Tianmu Mountain =

Mountain in Zhejiang, China

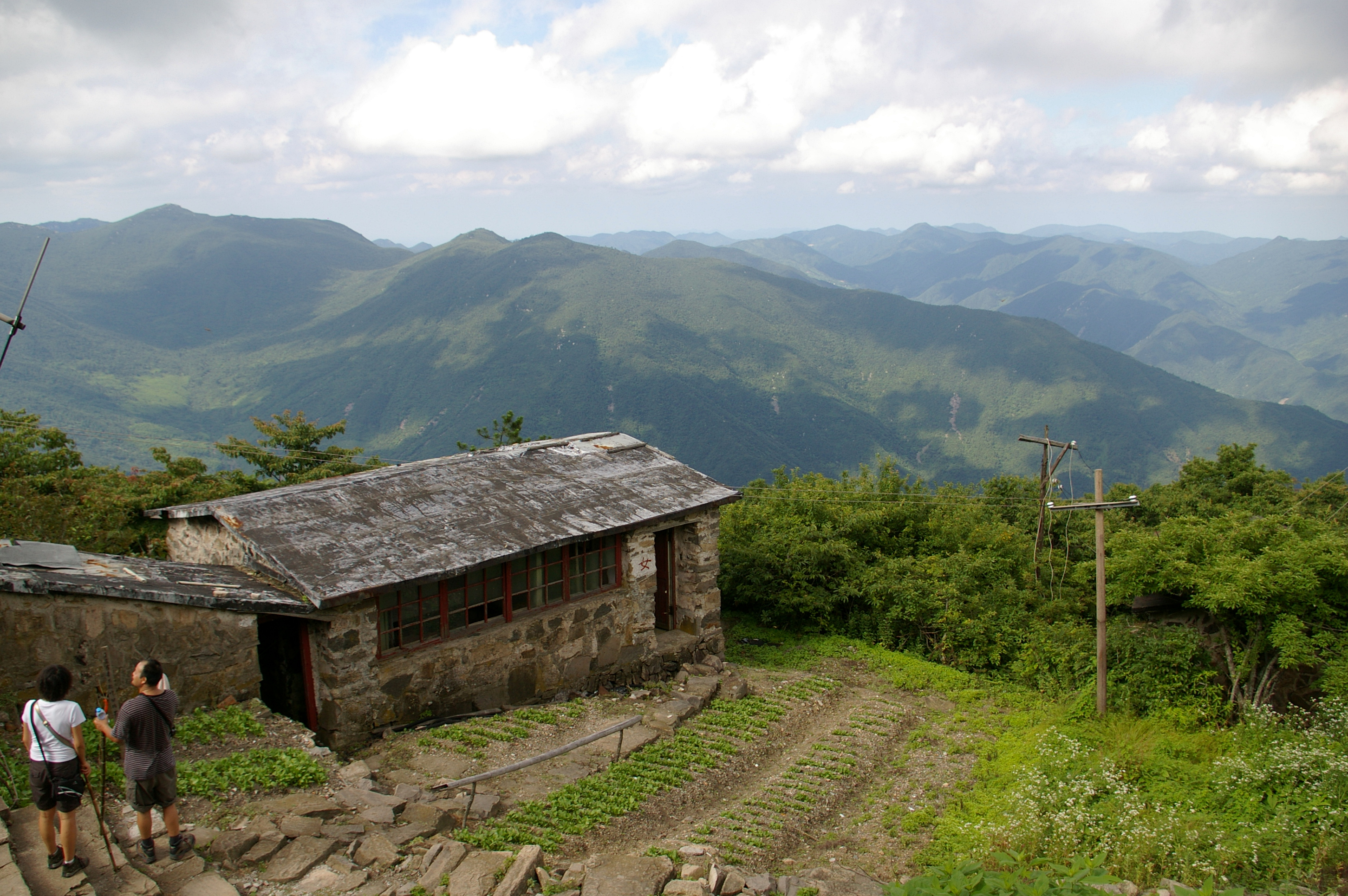
- View from the old meteorological station on Tianmu

Highest point
- Elevation: 1,506 m (4,941 ft)
- Coordinates: 30°20′0″N 119°25′0″E

Geography
- Location within Zhejiang
- Location: Zhejiang
- Country: China
- Parent range: Zhejiang–Fujian Hills

Tianmu Mountain, Mount Tianmu, or Tianmushan (Chinese: 天目山; pinyin: Tiānmù Shān; lit. 'Heavenly Eyes Mountain') is a mountain in Lin'an County 83.2 kilometers (51.7 mi) west of Hangzhou, Zhejiang, in eastern China. It is made up of two peaks: West Tianmu (1,506 meters or 4,941 feet) and East Tianmu (1,480 meters or 4,860 feet). Twin ponds near the top of the peaks led to the name of the mountain. China's Tianmu Mountain National Nature Reserve lies on the northwest portion of the mountain. It is a UNESCO Biosphere Reserve as part of UNESCO's Man and the Biosphere Programme.

Tianmu is known for giant Japanese cedars, waterfalls, Tianmu tea, peaks surrounded by clouds, bamboo shoots, temples and nunneries, and odd-shaped rocks. More than 2,000 species of plants grow on the mountain, including (on West Tianmu) a significant population of Ginkgo trees. These trees were previously thought to be wild, but were likely planted by Buddhist monks. Prominent among the Japanese cedars is the "Giant Tree King", named by the Qianlong Emperor of the Qing. In 2009, it measured 26.5 meters (86 ft 11 in) in height, 2.33 meters (7 ft 8 in) in diameter, and 42.9 cubic meters (1,510 cu ft) in volume. The mountain is also home to hundreds of species of birds and animals, including 39 endangered or protected species. These include the clouded leopard and the black muntjac.

In Chinese, the name Tianmushan can also refer to the adjacent range of mountains, including Mount Mogan.

== See also ==
- Tenmoku
