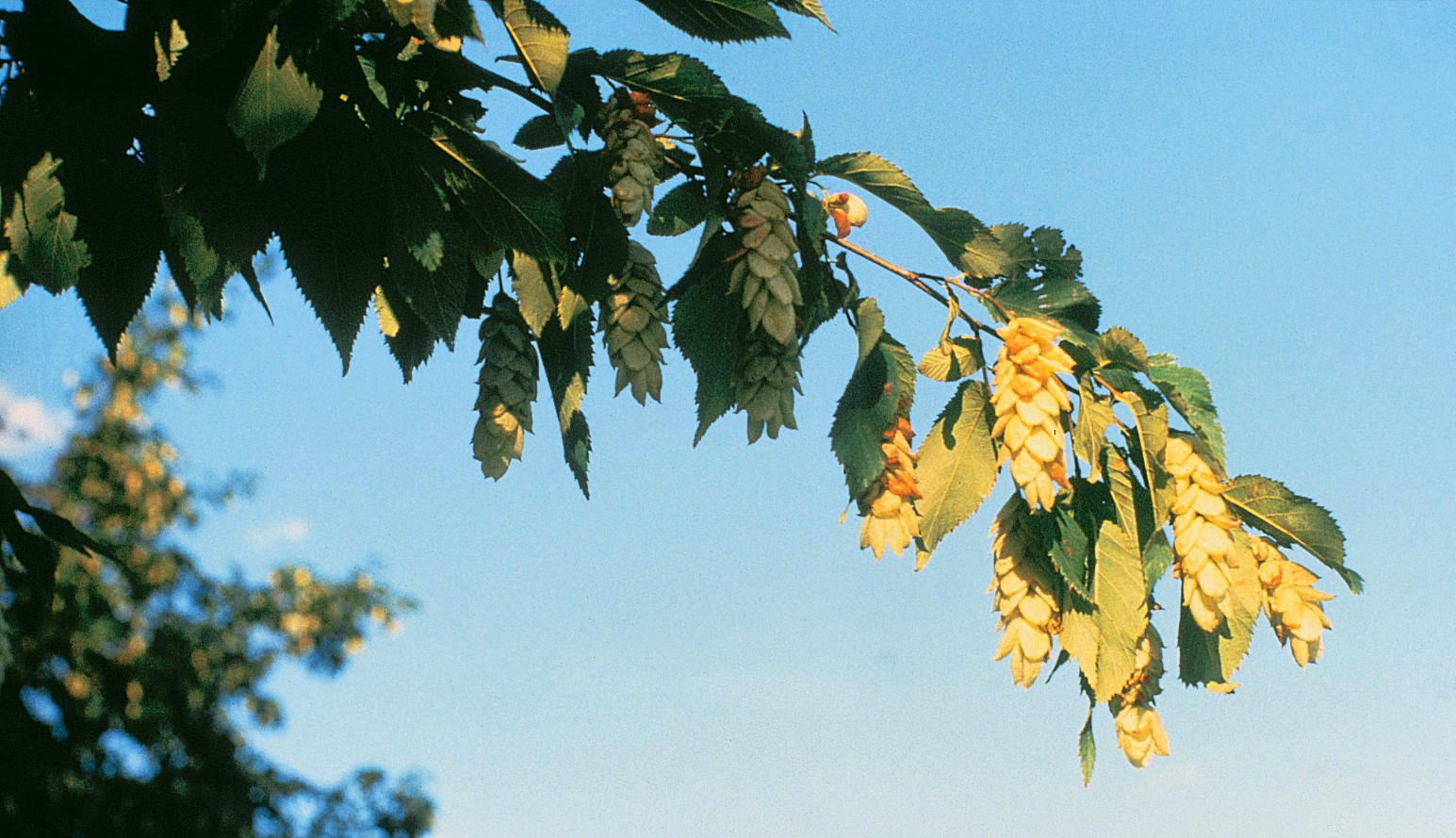
- Ostrya virginiana

Scientific classification
- Kingdom: Plantae
- Clade: Tracheophytes
- Clade: Angiosperms
- Clade: Eudicots
- Clade: Rosids
- Order: Fagales
- Family: Betulaceae
- Subfamily: Coryloideae
- Genus: Ostrya; Scop.

Synonyms
- Zugilus Raf.

= Ostrya =

Hophornbeam

Genus of trees

Ostrya is a genus of eight to 10 small deciduous tree species belonging to the birch family, Betulaceae. Common names include hop-hornbeam, hophornbeam and sometimes ironwood, a name shared with a number of other plants.

The genus is native in southern Europe, southwest and eastern Asia, and North and Central America. They have a conical or irregular crown and a scaly, rough bark. They have alternate and double-toothed birch-like leaves 3–10 cm long. The flowers are produced in spring, with male catkins 5–10 cm long and female aments 2–5 cm long. The fruit form in pendulous clusters 3–8 cm long with 6–20 seeds; each seed is a small nut 2–4 mm long, fully enclosed in a bladder-like involucre.

The wood is very hard and heavy. The genus name Ostrya is derived from the Greek word ὀστρύα (ostrúa), which may be related to ὄστρακον (óstrakon) "shell (of an animal)". Regarded as a weed tree by some foresters, this hard and stable wood was historically used to fashion plane soles.

Ostrya species host the larvae of various Lepidoptera species, providing food for winter moth, walnut sphinx, and Coleophora ostryae.

== Species ==
Ostrya has the following species:

- Ostrya carpinifolia Scop. – European hop-hornbeam - Mediterranean region of southern Europe, Middle-east, Turkey, Lebanon, Caucasus
- Ostrya chisosensis Correll – Chisos hophornbeam, Big Bend hophornbeam - endemic to Big Bend National Park in Texas
- Ostrya japonica Sarg. – Japanese hophornbeam - Japan, Korea, northern China
- Ostrya knowltonii Coville – Knowlton hophornbeam, western hophornbeam, wolf hophornbeam - Utah, Arizona, New Mexico, Texas
- Ostrya multinervis Rehd. – Central Chinese hop-hornbeam - central China
- Ostrya rehderiana Chun – Zhejiang hop-hornbeam - Zhejiang Province in China
- Ostrya trichocarpa D.Fang & Y.S.Wang – Guangxi Province in China
- Ostrya virginiana (Mill.) K. Koch – eastern hophornbeam, American hophornbeam, ironwood - eastern US, eastern Canada, Mexico, Guatemala, El Salvador, Honduras
- Ostrya yunnanensis W.K.Hu – Yunnan hop-hornbeam - Yunnan Province in China
- †Ostrya oregoniana (fossil)
- †Ostrya scholzii (fossil)

=== Fossil record ===
†Ostrya scholzii fossil seeds of the Chattian stage, Oligocene, are known from the Oberleichtersbach Formation in the Rhön Mountains, central Germany.
