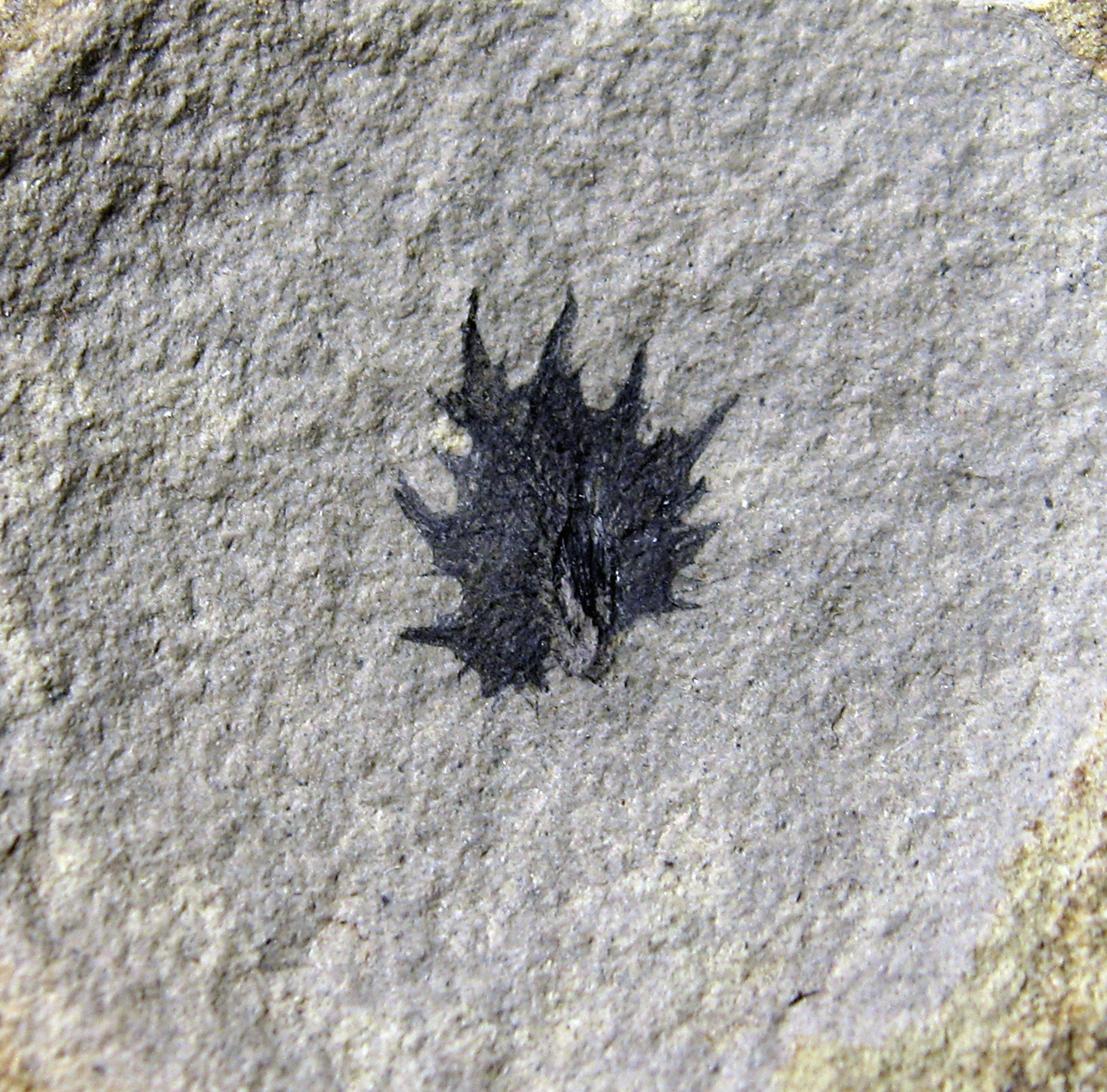
- Palaeocarpinus sp. fruit

Scientific classification
- Kingdom: Plantae
- Clade: Tracheophytes
- Clade: Angiosperms
- Clade: Eudicots
- Clade: Rosids
- Order: Fagales
- Family: Betulaceae
- Subfamily: Coryloideae
- Genus: †Palaeocarpinus; P.R. Crane

Type species
- Palaeocarpinus laciniata P.R. Crane

Species
- See text

= Palaeocarpinus =

Palaeocarpinus Temporal range: Early Paleocene?-Early Oligocene?

Extinct genus of flowering plants

Palaeocarpinus is an extinct genus of plants placed in the Betulaceae subfamily Coryloideae. The genus had a wide spread circumboreal distribution, with species found in North America, Europe, and Asia. The first appearance dates to the Early Paleocene and species are spread through the Paleocene and Eocene with the youngest species occurring at the Eocene-Oligocene boundary. A total of thirteen species have been named with a small grouping of referred specimens that have not been redescribed in the modern literature. Three species have been named from Asia, in 1996, 1998, and 2000. The type species and the first described species are both from Europe, being named in 1981 and 1859, though a North American species is reported in Northern Europe as well. North America has the largest diversity of the genus, with two groups of species known and several outliers. The first species was reported from the Okanagan Highlands in Canada and two additional species were named from the Highlands in 2003. A series of species is known from sites across the Great Plains-Rocky Mountains, with species named in 1992, 1996, 2004, and 2021. An additional species was described in 2021 from Oregon, and an undescribed fossil was reported from the Yukon but subsequently lost in transport. The first two species to be described were placed into several unrelated genera or into a form taxon for fruits before being moved into the genus. Palaeocarpinus is now placed basally into Coryloideae, with an unresolved relationship to the two modern coryloid tribes Coryleae and Carpinieae. The Palaeocarpinus plant was likely wind pollinated as with other Betulaceae species, while the fruits were possibly being wind or animal dispersed at maturity.

== Distribution and age ==
Palaeocarpinus species have a Circumboreal distribution across North America, Europe, and Asia. The ages of the species are concentrated in the early Paleogene, with most species being Paleocene to Eocene aged, though the youngest is possibly placed just into the Oligocene. Two occurrences of the genus in Europe date from the Paleocene, while the third is tentatively identified as Eocene. P. laciniata are type locality in strata of the Reading Formation outcropping in the Cold Ash quarry, near Newbury, Berkshire England. While the exact age is uncertain, the general age is late Paleocene (upper Paleocene of Crane, 1981). To the south in France, fossils recovered from the Menat Formation near Menat in Puy-de-Dôme have an agreed upon age of late Paleocene based on associated fossils and volcanic deposits. The northernmost occurrence of Palaeocarpinus are from the arctic Spitzbergen in western Svalbard. The fossils are produced by strata of the Storvola Formation which Golovneva (2002) reported outcropping along Adventfjorden, however, the site was later reported being on Prins Karls Forland by Julian E. Correa-Narvaez and Steven Manchester (2021). The exact age is uncertain, but based on surrounding stratigraphy plus palynological data, its most often cited to be Eocene.

Of the three Asian occurrences divided between Russia with two species and China with one, and includes both the oldest and youngest occurrences for the genus The western most site is south of the Irtysh river in the Altay Prefecture from rocks of the Wulungu Depression. Based on the associated plant flora of the formation, a Paleocene age is applied to the formation. The older of the two Russian localities, from which P. pacifica originates, is located near the lower course of the Amur in Khabarovsk Krai in the Russian Far East. The Malo-Mikhailovka Formation which outcrops near Puer Ridge between the Amur and the Strait of Tartary, has been identified as from the Early Paleocene's Danian age. In contrast, the Sikhote-Alin site on the Strait of Tartary's Buoy Bay, 8 km (8,000 m) south of Nelma village is the youngest of the known Palaeocarpinus sites. The locality is part of the Kizi Group, with the site included in the uppermost strata of the Buoy Bay Member. Floral and mammalian correllaitions are indestinct and give possible ages between the Late Eocene and the Early Oligocene. One volcanic rock yielded a Potassium-argon date of 34 ± 0.8 million years old, within a million years of the Eocene-Oligocene boundary.

The greatest concentration of species and localities is found across the Western regions of North America, with species groups in the Great Plains-Rocky Mountains, in the Oregon interior, and in the greater Okanagan region of British Columbia and Washington. The northern most of the great plains localities is at Munce's Hill near Joffre, Alberta where Paskapoo Formation rocks of possible Lacombe member affinity outcrop in a road cut. The age of the Lacombe member is accepted to likely be Late Paleocene in the Tiffanian. Most of the Great Plains and Rocky Mountains sites are placed into various Fort Union Group formations. The two western North Dakota occurrences, at Almont and Beicegel Creek respectively, are both in the Tiffanian Sentinel Butte Formation of the Fort Union Group, while the eastern Montana sites around Big Timber are Fort Union Formation. All species in the Wyoming region are known from Fort Union Formation fossils, with most sites in Wyoming in the P-3 pollen zone and thus Middle Paleocene.

Palaeocarpinus specimens have been recovered from at least twelve individual sites in the Eocene Okanagan Highlands, with named species from the Coldwater Beds near Quilchena and Allenby Formation near Princeton, British Columbia, plus the Klondike Mountain Formation in Republic, Washington, northern Ferry County, Washington. The Okanagan highlands are aged between 51.5 ± 0.4 million years ago for the Quilchena site to 51.2 to 49.4 million years ago for the Klondike Mountain Formations Tom Thumb Tuff member. Additional Palaeocarpinus sp. fossils were reported from Okanagan highlands sites of the Tranquille Formation near Cache Creek, British Columbia and the Horsefly Shales near Horsefly, British Columbia in 1908. Pigg, Manchester, and Wehr added the report of unplaced fruits in the Driftiwood Shales near Smithers, British Columbia, the Golden Promise site outside Republic, and Corkscrew Mountain near Toroda, Washington.

A tentative report of Palaeocarpinus fossils from the Yukon Paleogene was published by Matthew Vavrek et al. (2012). During field work in 2008 and 2009 fossils of latest Paleocene to possibly earliest Eocene were collected from an outcrop of the Bonnet Plume Formation southeast of Eagle Plains on the Peel River. Field identification of the specimens concluded them to belong to Palaeocarpinus but they were never able to be studied, being lost or destroyed in transport from the field site.

All four of the fossil sites in Oregon are placed within the Clarno Formation outcropping in the Blue Mountains area in the northeastern part of the state. Several methods of radiometric dating have been applied to that unit of the Clarno, with coinciding results. Fission track data from zircon crystals and ^{40}Ar/^{39}Ar data from plagioclase crystals have both yielded an Eocene age between 46.8 to 44.7 MYA, placing the fossils as from the Lutetian. The Clarno formation nut beds flora is also the type and only locality for the locule cast morphotaxon Kardiasperma parvum, to which the compression species Palaeocarpinus parva is notably similar to.

The genus Palaeocarpinus was first described and typified by paleobotanist Peter Crane in 1981 based on English fossils. Working on English material collected in riverine deposits of the Reading Formation exposed near Newbury, Berkshire, he encountered a group of nutlets reminiscent of both Carpinus and Corylus nuts. Given that the characters of the new material did not conform to either genus, but were a mix of the two, Crane opted to erect a new genus and species for them Palaeocarpinus laciniata. He chose the genus name as a combination of Palaeo- from the Greek "palaiós" meaning old, plus Carpinus. He coined the species name from the Latin word laciniata which means "lacerated or slashed", in reference to the deeply lobed appearance of the bracts. While the type series only encompasses the holotype, V.5982 and six paratype specimens, a total of 54 nutlets, 25 with attached bracts, were examined for the description. Coming from sites A and B in Cold Ash Quarry, all the examined specimens were deposited into the Department of Palaeontology, Natural History Museum, London.

The earliest reported fossils now attributed to Palaeocarpinus were from the Menat Formation, with Oswald Heer (1859) publishing a group of fossils as Anchietea borealis. Nearly 20 years later, another fossil from Menat was given the name Corylus lamottii by Gaston de Saporta (1877), but no description was supplied with the name so it was considered nomen nudum. Heers' Menat fossils were later redescribed and moved to Atriplex borealis by Louis Laurent. While this placement was unchanged until the 1981 publication of the genus Palaeocarpinus by Crane, the affinity of the fossils to Betulaceae was first suggested by Saporta and Antoine-Fortuné Marion (1885), who put forward the connection between the fruits and leaves called Corylus macquarii. Crane noted in his work on the English fossils that the Menat specimens were also from the same genus, but did not present a formal reassignment. His change was accepted by later workers, but an official redescription was not presented until Julian E. Correa-Narvaez and Steven Manchester (2021) in their monograph on the genus who officially moved the species to Palaeocarpinus borealis. Over the preceding century Heers original specimen, which he did not illustrate or note as holotype, was lost. As such, Correa-Narvaez & Manchester chose to designate "MEN 19" in the National Museum of Natural History, France as neotype.

Palaeocarpinus dentata is the first North American species described, being first discussed by David P. Penhallow in 1890. The original fruit was collected in 1888 by George Mercer Dawson during summer field work in the Okanagan Highlands region. Found near Stump Lake in the Quilchena area Dawson very briefly detailed the specimen and noted that it was superficially similar to Carpinus nutlets, but not referable to the genus. The bracts of the specimen are notably faint on the fruit and Dawson attributed it to being displaced pericarp, outer fleshy fruit tissues. Penhallow chose to name the species Carpolithus dentatus, the genus placement being a form genus for plant fruits and seeds of uncertain affinity. The specimen was deposited in the Redpath Museum by the Geological Survey of Canada as specimen 2.2420. The fossils from Stump Lake are part of the Coldwater Beds, and the fossils are related to the near by Quilchena flora. The specimen was later designated the lectotype for the species by Kathleen Pigg, Steven Manchester, and Wesley Wehr (2003), who moved the species from Carpolithus to Palaeocarpinus dentatus. They noted that the specific epithet dentata was likely a reference to the toothed outline of the bracts. The species name was further corrected by Correa and Manchester who noted Palaeocarpinus is a feminine Latin noun in construction, so the species name should have been shifted to P. dentata when moved from Carpolithus which is a neuter noun.

All the additional species of the genus have been described after 1990, though there are undescribed specimens which are from the early 1890's or which have been lost and never described.

Eleven years after the work by Crane, the next Palaeocarpinus species was described from a series of around 500 specimens. Fusheng Sun and Ruth Stockey, both at the University of Alberta at the time, described Palaeocarpinus joffrensis from assorted cymules, fruits, isolated bracts and partial infructescences. All of the fossils had been collected from the Paskapoo Formation near Joffre in central Alberta and subsequently accessioned into the University of Alberta paleobotanical collection. Sun and Stockey chose the mostly complete infructescence S26016 A&B as the holotype, and then a large selection of fruits, cymules, infructescences, and bracts as paratypes. The majority of specimens that were used in the type description were collected singlehandedly by A. E. (Betty) Speirs of Red Deer, Alberta and donated to the University of Alberta.

Palaeocarpinus aspinosa was first described by Manchester and Zhiduan Chen (1996) from a group of over 20 paratypes and the holotype. The holotype, UF 15977, and 11 of the paratypes were deposited in the University of Florida (UF) palaeobotanical collections. The others in the type series were split between the Denver Museum of Natural History and the National Museum of Natural History. All of the fossils are from localities in southern and southwestern Wyoming, restricted to exposures of the Tiffanian Fort Union Formation. Of the sites known, the type locality was chosen as UF locality 18123 in Bison Basin, Fremont County, Wyoming; an area with 10 different quarry sites all working the same stratigraphic level of the formation. Three additional sites are scattered across Sweetwater County, Wyoming in the Northwest, Burley Draw, and Earnest Butte Quadrangles respectively. The final two localities are found in the Castle Gardens and Rairden Quadrangle of Bighorn county. The origin or meaning of the specific epithet aspinosa was not explained by Manchester and Chen.

In the same year, Manchester partnered with Guo Shuang-Xing of the Nanjing Institute of Palaeontology to issue the description of Palaeocarpinus orientalis. A series of fossils were studies from the type locality in the Xinjiang region of northwestern China. Based on the holotype PB 17158 and the paratype series of six specimens, all part of the Nanjing Institute of Geology and Palaeontology collections, Manchester and Guo named the new species in a march 2006 article in the International Journal of Plant Sciences. The species was named as orientalis but an explanation was not provided for the etymology. The species was noted to be the first Asian and first Chinese occurrence for Palaeocarpinus.

While discussing the floristics components the Puer Ridge site in the eastern Sikhote-Alin mountains of Russia in 1998, M.A. Akhmet'ev and L. B. Golovneva reported on the first Russian occurrence of Palaeocarpinus. A single bract specimen was recovered from the Malo-Mikhailovka Formation, deemed the type locality, and placed into the Russian Academy of Sciences Geological Institute collections as GIN no. 3803/3c. As the only specimen, it was deemed the holotype of the new species Palaeocarpinus pacifica. As with a number of other species the authors did not provide an explanation for the choice of species name.

Two years later Akhmet'ev partnered with Manchester to described a second Palaeocarpinus Sikhote-Alin species. This one, Palaeocarpinus sikhotealinensis, from a site along the coast, was based on a series of five fossils all of which were deposited in the Russian Academy of Sciences as holotype GIN, no. 229/3804, and four additional fossils not designated as paratypes. Akhmet'ev and Manchester selected the toponym "sikhotealinensis" as a reference to the Sikhote-Alin Mountains which border Buoy Bay where the type locality is located.

Two new species were also described by Kathleen Pigg, Manchester, and Wesley Wehr in 2003. Palaeocarpinus barksdaleae was described from a holotype and a series of 89 paratypes. The holotype, UWBM 97408A & B, and 82 of the paratypes were included in the Burke Museum of Natural History and Culture (UWBM) palaeobotanical collections. A small group of five paratypes were placed in the Arizona State University collections, while the final two were University of Florida specimens. The type locality within the Klondike Mountain Formation was identified as UWBM site B5077 - "Gold Mountain". Other sites of the Klondike Mountain Formation have also produced P. barksdaleae fruits, including UWBM B4131 "Boot Hill", B2737 "Knob Hill" and UWBM B1795 "Resner Canyon". The specific epithet barksdaleae was designated as a matronym honoring Lisa Barksdale in recognition of the 14 years she spent as curator for the Stonerose Interpretive Center, guiding public and scientific access to the Republic fossils. Palaeocarpinus stonebergae was described by Pigg, Manchester and Wehr from the Princeton, British Columbia area. The type series includes the holotype, UWBM 77466, and a series of 22 paratypes in the Burke Museum, plus one paratype at the University of Florida. The type locality within the Allenby Formation was UWBM site B4294 - "Thomas Ranch" while only one other Princeton area site, UWBM site B3264 "Coalmont Bluffs" was noted to have produced specimens. The specific epithet stonebergae in a matronym honoring Margaret Stoneberg for her work bringing scientific and public attention back to the fossils of the Princeton region.

A year after the Okanagan Highlands paper, Pigg, Manchester and Crane published on another new species. This time the fossils were from the Late Paleocene Sentinel Butte Formation of North Dakota, with a 16 specimen type series. The holotype PP34080 and four of the paratypes were contained in the Field Museum paleobotany collections in Chicago, Illinois, while the remaining paratypes were in the University of Florida. Along with the holotype, some of the paratypes were chosen from the fossil collected at the Almont, North Dakota type locality. The remaining paratype series comprised material collected at the Beicegel Creek creek site. Given both the type locality and the secondary locality for the Palaeocarpinus dakotensis fossils were recovered from were in North Dakota, the specific epithet dakotensis was picked.

In discussing the Paleocene/Eocene fossils recovered from the Yukon Bonnet Plume Formation Vavrek et al. (2012) noted that several possible Palaeocarpinus had been found, but none of them survived transport from the site. As such the nature and affinities of the fruits is unknown.

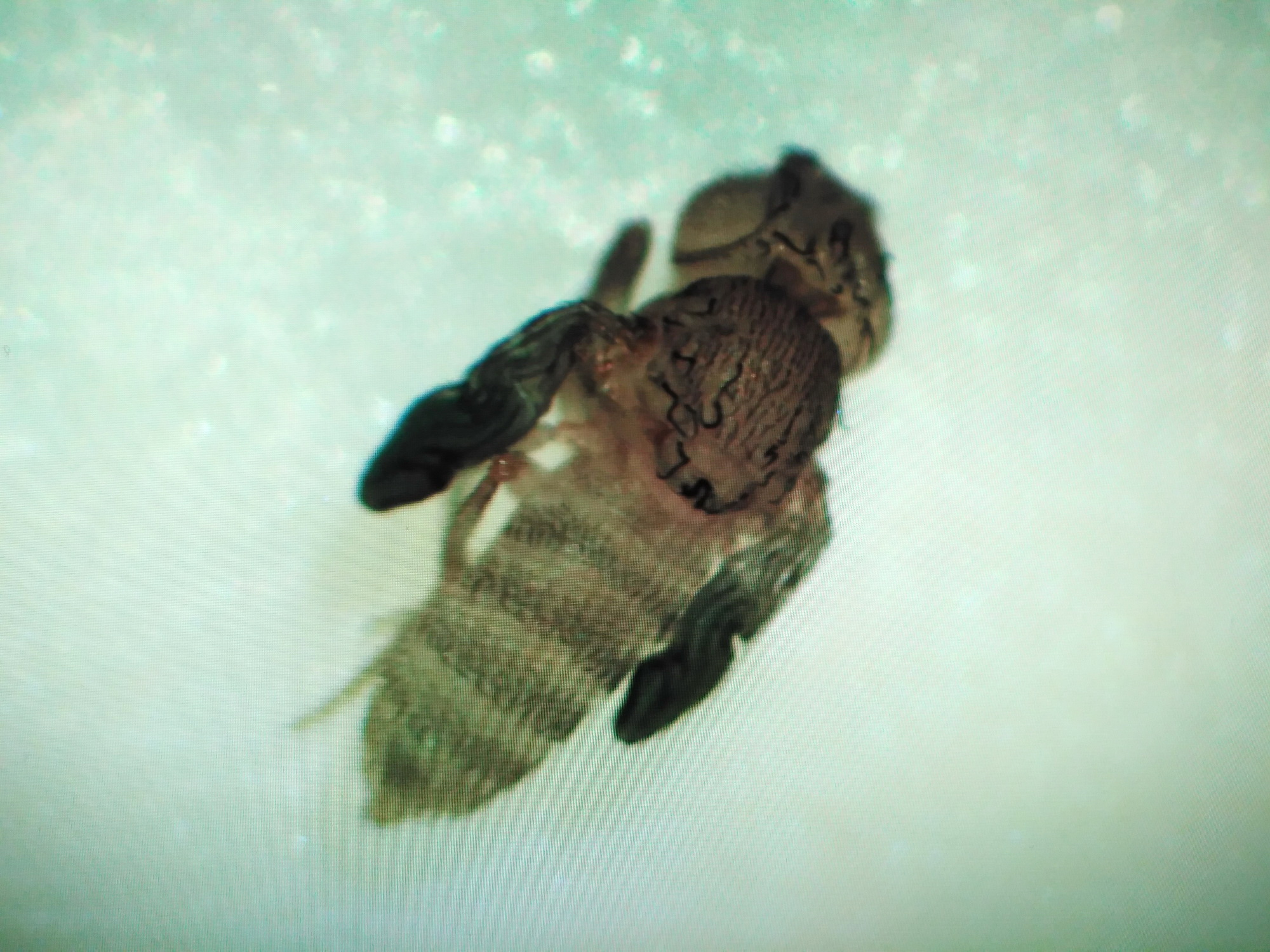
A Fruit fly with vestigial wings, inspiration for the species name Palaeocarpinus pteravestigia

After a gap of over 15 years three new species were named and the genus as a whole was monographed by Correa-Narvaez and Manchester (2021). Based on fossils collected at the two sites in Natrona County, Wyoming, they named two species recovered at different stratigraphic levels of the Fort Union Formation there. Both Palaeocarpinus pterabaratra and Palaeocarpinus pteravestigia have the designated type locality of "Hells Half acre", UF locality 18,250, with P. pterabaratra also being known from UF locality 15740e, which is 3.1 km (1.9 mi) south-southeast of Hells Half Acre on the Powder River. The holotypes for each species, UF18250–26206 and UF15740d-15,868 respectively, are both housed in the Florida Museum of Natural History. Similarly three of the paratypes for P. pterabaratra are at the Florida Museum, while the last paratype along with the single P. pteravestigia paratype are housed in the Field Museum. For the species epithets, Correa-Narvaez and Manchester chose the name pterabaratra, a combination of the Greek language ptera, meaning "winged" and baratra, meaning "hell", as a reference to the bracts and the type locality of "Hells half acre". The name pteravestigia on the other hand combined ptera with the Latin vestigia meaning "trace", an allusion to the bracts looking similar to the vestigial wings seen in some strains of fly mutants.

The third species they described was based on a series of fossils collected at four sites in the Blue Mountains of Northeastern Oregon. The type locality for Palaeocarpinus parva was designated as the White Cliffs site, UF locality 262, and additional paratype fossils came from the Alex Canyon, Red Gap, and West Branch Creek sites. All of the type series, holotype UF 262–19,255 and the seven paratypes are included in the Florida Museum of Natural History. They selected the Oregon species name as parva which is latin for "small" noting it as both a specific call out to the nutlet size and also a reference to Kardiasperma parvum. While they are not directly associated in the Clarno Formation, Palaeocarpinus parva is noted by Correa-Narvaez & Manchester to be distinctly similar to the mineralized betulaceous locule casts described from the Clarno nut beds as Kardiasperma parvum. They noted the casts are possibly permineralized Palaeocarpinus, with the size matching P. parva

== Phylogeny ==
The subfamily Coryloideae is divided into two widely accepted tribes, Carpinieae with the living genera Carpinus, Ostrya, and Ostryopsis, and Coryleae, with the single living genus Corylus. In addition to the living genera and Palaeocarpinus, three other extinct genera have been assigned to the subfamily, Cranea, Coryloides and Asterocarpinus. Placement of Palaeocarpinus within the subfamily is uncertain, and several hypotheses have been suggested, with no firm support for any of them. There is a possibility that the subfamily evolved in the Cretaceous and Palaeocarpinus is an early unique branch which evolved alongside the living tribes before dying out in the early Oligocene. Alternatively Palaeocarpinus could be an early paraphyletic grouping of stem species from which both tribes evolved, a suggestion based on the nutlets being similar to Carpinus but the bracts being closer to Corylus.

== Description ==
All Palaeocarpinus species fruits have a small Carpinus like nutlets with ribbing running length-wise on the surface. They all also have a pair of surrounding bracts with varying degrees of specialization in shape and size. The fruits are born in cymule pairs on long infructescences to which some species fruits detach at maturity while others remain affixed as a group.

=== Palaeocarpinus aspinosa Manchester & Chen ===
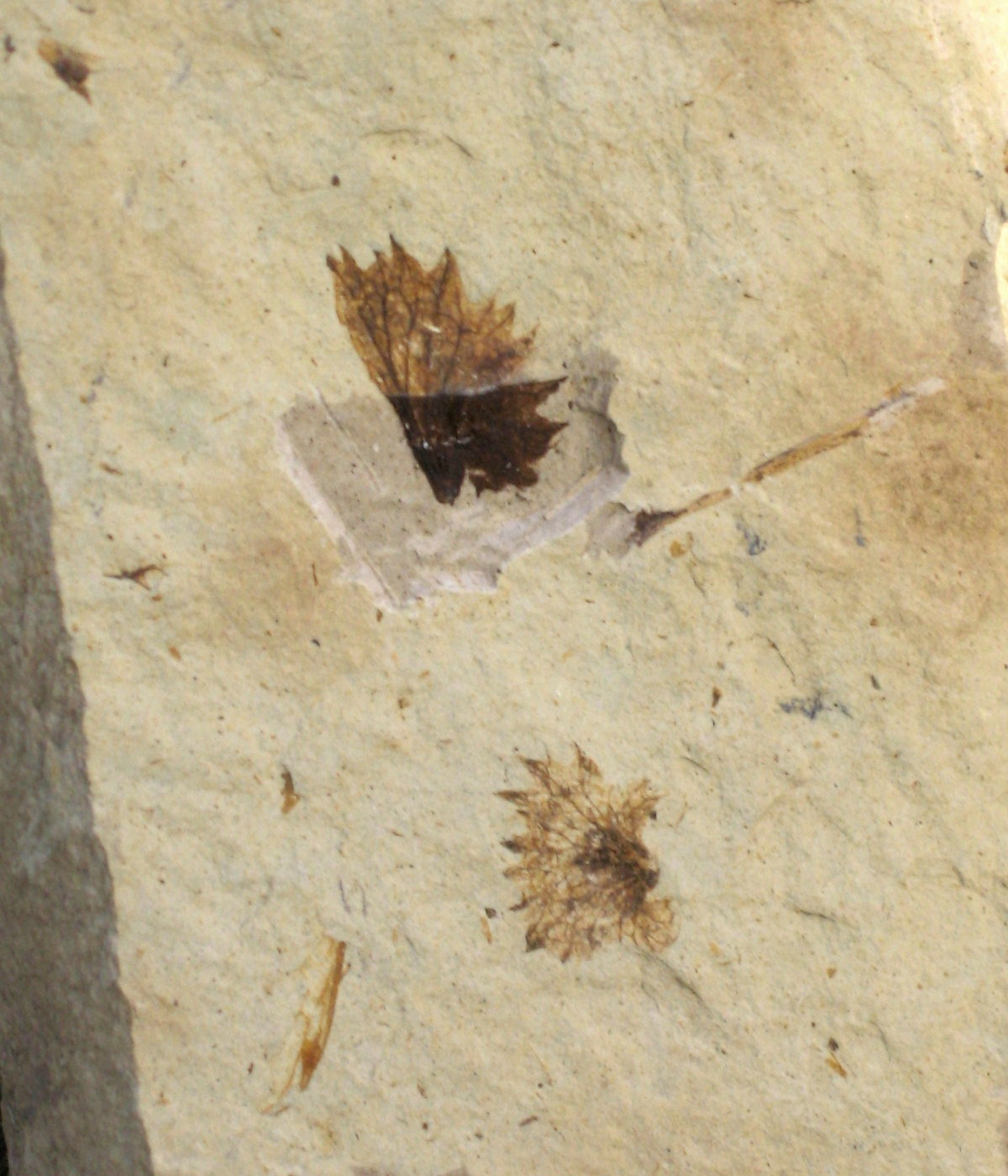
Palaeocarpinus barksdaleae

The fruiting heads for Palaeocarpinus aspinosa area known from a series of specimens and range in length between 27–50 mm (1 1/16–1 15/16 in) or longer and have a 12–30 mm (1/2–1 3/16 in) diameter. The cymules are usually positioned in helical sets of 5, starting at around 15–16 mm (9/16–5/8 in) up the 1 mm (1/16 in) wide stalk. The internode space between cymule clusters is between 5–7 mm (3/16–1/4 in). Each cymule pair is either sessile on the stem or born on a short pedicel. The nutlets are oval to elliptical and compressed, though the compression is possibly due to fossilization and not natural. They have a large basal scar and five to eight ribs on each side. the nut tip is capped with a tapered style. There is a noted size difference between some sites with nuts up to 9.5–11 mm (3/8–7/16 in) or down to 5–6 mm (3/16–1/4 in) tall. The nutlets are enclosed between two unlobed, fan shaped bracts which are smooth edged with occasionally very sparsely toothed apical margins. Small primary bracts circa 1.8 mm × 0.8 mm (1/16 in × 1/16 in) with a pointed tip are present in some specimens. The primary bracts do not develop to aide in dispersal. Elliptical to ovate in outline, the tertiary bracts have a typical thickened texture, 9–6 mm (3/8–1/4 in) long by 3–9 mm (1/8–3/8 in) and have longitudinal lines crossing the external side. The smooth tertiary bracts was initially suggested as an adaptation trend towards abiotic wind dispersal, while later suggestion was that dispersal was though nuts dropping from the cymules.

=== Palaeocarpinus barksdaleae Pigg, Manchester & Wehr ===
One Palaeocarpinus barksdaleae fruiting head has been described, with a mass of approximately ten fruits grouped helically along the central stem. Fruits are most frequently found alone, rather than in a pair or as a group on stem, likely do to dispersal as lone fruits being a part of the reproductive strategy. The nutlets are enclosed between two unlobed, fan shaped bracts. The bract tissue is thickened and there are around twelve palmate veins which branch towards the upper margins. The general size of the bracts ranges between 4.5–10 mm (3/16–3/8 in) tall and 6–11 mm (1/4–7/16 in) wide giving an almost square outline. Some of the secondary veins, and all of the primaries, terminate in the bract spines, while a network of fine reticulate tertiary veins interlaces between the larger veins as well as looping back on themselves in the bract margin. The small nutlets have a flattened base and a slightly elongated rounded outline with eight to ten total ribs arising around the nutlet. The nutles are only 1.3–3.2 mm (1/16–1/8 in) wide and between 2.5–5 mm (1/8–3/16 in) tall and the nut tip has a 1 mm (1/16 in) tall style that possibly splits in two near the tip.

=== Palaeocarpinus borealis (Heer) Correa & Manchester ===
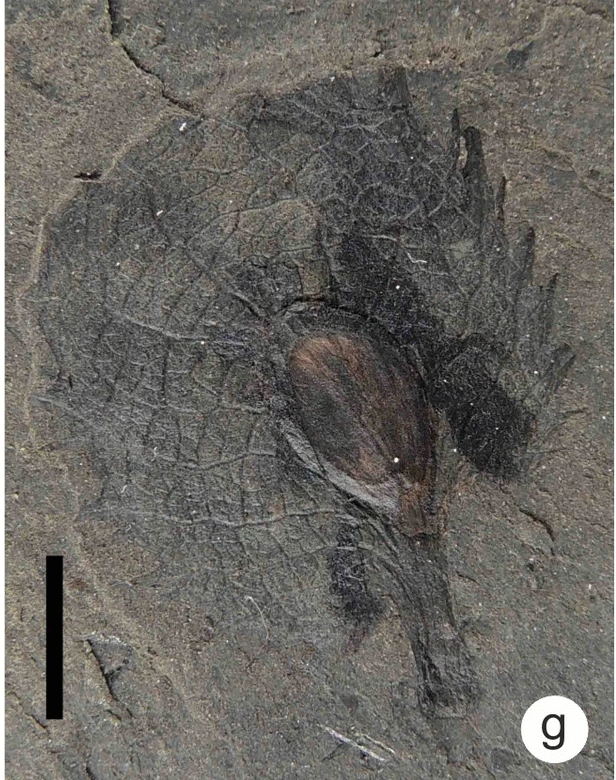
P. borealis fruit

P. borealis has only been described from only singular fruits, and so the larger infructescence structure is unknown. The fruits were born from the central stem on a small pedicel, and where they are preserved, they are between 2.5–3 mm (1/8–1/8 in) long. The 7.9–9 mm (5/16–3/8 in) tall by 3.5 mm (1/8 in) wide individual fruits are accompanied by a pair of unlobed bracts that have serrated apices and toothed sides. The bracts are oval in outline with a narrower base then the widened tip. Its major veins run from base to apex of the bract in a zig-zagging pattern along with looping patterning along the bract margins. As with other species, the rounded oval nutlet has a forked style at the nut tip and has three to four ribs per nut face. The nutlets are between 3 mm (1/8 in) wide and 4–5 mm (3/16–3/16 in) tall.

=== Palaeocarpinus dakotensis Manchester, Pigg & Crane ===
Palaeocarpinus dakotensis fruiting heads are more frequently encountered than isolated nuts or bracts. The cylindrical fruiting heads range in length between 70–110 mm (2 3/4–4 5/16 in) and up to 30–40 mm (1 3/16–1 9/16 in) in diameter. Unlike P. joffrensis where the cymules pairs have consistent short bare internode separations, P. dakotensis infructescences are varied, with some heads having large spaces between cymule group while others are tightly packed and show little internode space. The cymules are spouted from the 1.0–2.8 mm (1/16–1/8 in) woody stem in a helical spiral of up to around 15 pairs. Each cymule pair is sessile on the axis with the nuts preserved to each side of the stem on occasion. The nutlets are oval, being taller than wide, with around fifteen vertical stripes on each side. On average they are between 4–5 mm (3/16–3/16 in) wide and 6–6.5 mm (1/4–1/4 in) tall, but can reach up to 8 mm × 9 mm (5/16 in × 3/8 in) in outsized specimens. Unlike other species the forked style appears to have possibly been deciduous, not all nutlets having an in place style present. The nutlets are enclosed between two unlobed, fan shaped bracts which are smooth edged with occasionally very sparsely toothed apical margins. The bracts are deeply dissected to fully bilobed with the margins ranging between toothed to having developed spines that lay in flat inline with the bract. The papery or parchment like bracts are between to 17–24 mm (11/16–15/16 in) long by 12–19 mm (1/2–3/4 in) wide with several vessel bundles and a highly fibrous tissue structure.

Permineralized specimens allowed for successive serial sectioning of several nutlets. The fruiting bodies are enclosed in perianth derived from the apical petal lobes indicating the flowers were born at the apex of the ovary. Many of the nuts have two fully developed chambers with a thin septum as separation, though other nutlets show a single developed chamber and a undeveloped ruptured chamber. In the unilocular and bilocular nutlets both, the developed chambers each have a solitary seed connected to the chamber wall near the apex.

=== Palaeocarpinus dentata (Penhallow) Pigg, Manchester & Wehr ===
The original type description for Palaeocarpinus dentata was based on a single fruit, and as of 2021 no infructescences have been located. The lectotype fruit has broad shallowly toothed bracts that are 10 mm (3/8 in) wide and 8 mm (5/16 in) tall. Venation in the paired bracts is branching with some veins supplying marginal spines, while reticulated secondary vein cross between the main veins. The single nutlet have an elliptical outline, 4 mm (3/16 in) by 2 mm (1/16 in), with pointed apical area and a broadened and flat base. There is a possible single forked style at the apex.

=== Palaeocarpinus joffrensis Sun & Stockey ===
Palaeocarpinus joffrensis infructescences are well known at the North American localities the species occurs at. The cylindrical fruiting heads range in length up to 60 mm (2 3/8 in), up to 20 mm (13/16 in) in diameter, with the cymules pairs born separately with short bare internodes separating. Each cymule pair is born on a short pedicel ranging between 0.5–1.3 mm (0–1/16 in) long. The nutlets are oval, being taller than wide, with over ten vertical stripes on each side. They have a large basal scar and five to eight ribs on each side. the nut tip is capped with a forked style. The nutlets are enclosed between two unlobed, fan shaped bracts which are smooth edged with occasionally very sparsely toothed apical margins. Two types of tertiary bracts are found on specimens. One bract type has a deeply bilobed outline which range up to 6–8 mm (1/4–5/16 in) long and 5–6 mm (3/16–1/4 in) with typical thickened texture plus irregular teeth. The second type of bracts, occurring without any nutlets, is narrower, taller, and has a deeper cleft between the lobes. The bracts are 1.5–5 mm (1/16–3/16 in) wide and 9–12 mm (3/8–1/2 in) tall with irregular teeth forming slight spines.

=== Palaeocarpinus laciniata Crane ===
Palaeocarpinus laciniata is only known from single nutlets and paired cymules, with no indications of pedicel, giving no indications of the fruiting head structure. Based on the predominance of paired cymules recovered, scattering as the pair was likely the major dispersal method. As with other species, the nutlet has a lateral compression to its shape, with an elliptical to oval outline and narrower than tall. Nutlets range between 1.5–3.6 mm (1/16–1/8 in) wide while they rage between 3.4–5.3 mm (1/8–3/16 in). Both the nutlet and bract surfaces are noted to have hairs. The nutlet hairs have a density on most of the nutlet of 10-25 hairs per 100 μm^{2}, but the concentration increases over the nutlet ridges. Three ridges run up each face of the two nutlet faces, two lateral ridges which bracket the central median ridge. The bracts also bore scattered long hairs on the outer surfaces. As with the nutlets the bracts are taller then wide, with heights ranging between 8–15 mm (5/16–9/16 in) and widths only being 5–6 mm (3/16–1/4 in). Each bract is typically divided into five total lobes that penetrate down halfway to the base and with irregularly placed teeth. The bracts are vascularized with between eight and twelve veins which fork as they progress up the bract to the apices where they terminate in the teeth.

=== Palaeocarpinus orientalis Manchester & Guo ===
Palaeocarpinus orientalis is known from isolated fruits and less frequently fruiting heads. The fruiting heads are smaller then other species, ranging between 47 mm (1 7/8 in) long and up to 18 mm (11/16 in) wide. The sessile cymule pairs are closely spaced on the stalk with little to no internodal spacing visible. The elliptical nutlets are long and narrow, being up to 5 mm (3/16 in) tall and 2.5 mm (1/8 in) wide. Due to the preservation state of the fossils, no surface details are visible and so the presence or absence of ribbing as seen in other species can not be determined. The fibrous to leathery bracts are varied, with three distinct morphologies identified. Two of the three bract types have serrate spined to toothed margins and a wide main area. With unlobed bracts the outline is slightly more elongate and the main area narrower, while bilobed bracts are stouter and widened with a wider main area possibly partially comprised of webbing. The thirds type has the teeth enlarged into five undulatory lobes per bract edge. All of the bracts range between 10–15 mm (3/8–9/16 in) tall and 6–12 mm (1/4–1/2 in) wide and are too thick to identify internal venation patterning. On the bracts where spines are present, the veins transition directly onto the spine, and the spines branch in a pinnate patterning. Based on the rarity of fruiting heads and the frequency of isolated nutlets its likely the species dispersed loose seeds and not as a whole head.

=== Palaeocarpinus pacifica Akhmetiev & Goloveneva ===
Palaeocarpinus pacifica is poorly known due to only a single bract specimen having been found and described. The nutlets, cymule pair structure and fruit head details are all unknown at this point. The bract is 4 mm (3/16 in) wide and 6 mm (1/4 in) tall with smooth sides culminating in a serrated apical margin. Overall the shape is obovate with a roughly tongue shape, slightly narrowed at the base and wider and rounded at the apex. The bract has a leathery texture and palmate venation with the veins which occasionally forking and then merging with neighboring veins.

=== Palaeocarpinus parva Correa-Narvaez & Manchester ===
All of the described Palaeocarpinus parva nutlets are preserved as isolated single fruits and not as cymule pairs or on infructescences. The nutlets were apparently born as nearly sessile on the infructescences, with a 0.5 mm × 1 mm (0.020 in × 0.039 in) wide pedicel present at the nutlet base. Being some of the smallest Palaeocarpinus nutlets, they range from 1–2 mm (1/16–1/16 in) wide and 1.5–2 mm (1/16–1/16 in) wide, with only small P. stonebergae specimens getting almost as small. The nutlets have a reversed heart shape, with the point as its apex, a shape shared with the betulaceous locule cast morphospecies Kardiasperma parvum also from the Clarno formation. Due to the encompassing bracts, the longitudinal ribbing of the nutlet is obscured and the total number per side is uncertain. The nutlet tips sport a prominent forked style. Enclosing the nutlest are a pair of highly modified bracts with very reduced webbing and venation modified into spines. The bracts are anywhere from 4–12 mm (3/16–1/2 in) in height, between 2–10 mm (1/16–3/8 in) wide and possessing up to 5 thin lobes. The veins almost all feed directly into the vein-spines which usually all point straight upwards from the basal area. The bracts have very little webbing between the spines, with the majority of the webbing reduced to thin segments at the lobe bases.

=== Palaeocarpinus pterabaratra Correa & Manchester ===
Palaeocarpinus pterabaratra is known from only from isolated cymule pairs, and had not been found either in a larger fruiting head or as a solitary nut with bract. The nutlets are 6–6.5 mm (1/4–1/4 in) tall, 5.4–5.8 mm (3/16–1/4 in) wide and have a ovate shape. Both faces of the nutlets faces have four or five ridges running base to tip for a total of eight to ten ridges. The nutlets are lacking styles, though it is possible they were lost during transport and deposition. Unlike the other Fort Union Formation species, the bracts are ovate to elliptical in outline with a nearly toothless margin. In the basal region around the sessile nutlets there are a few lateral spines present, while the rest of the bract margin is smooth. Between six and nine primary veins run from the nutlet region to the bract margins each with pinnate secondary veins branching off close to the vein bases. The primary veins run along straight or slightly curvy paths, while tertiary and quaternary veins form a fine reticulated pattern between the primaries and secondaries.

=== Palaeocarpinus pteravestigia Correa & Manchester ===
Palaeocarpinus pteravestigia is also known only from fused cymule pairs only, with one fragmentary fossil possibly showing an attachment, but not enough of the specimen was recovered to be certain. Of the known specimens, the nutlets are 2–3 mm (1/16–1/8 in) wide and up to 5 mm (3/16 in) tall and have a simple apex, though its noted the lack of styles may be due to loss in incomplete preservation. The bracts are deeply bilobed or fully unlobed in morphology, with both ranging between 0–12 mm (0–1/2 in) tall and 5–7 mm (3/16–1/4 in) wide. The teeth have an irregular patterning that increases in tooth density apically. As a result the apex has the largest and most distinct teeth which have transitioned into spines. As with other species, the primary veins are palmate and travel up the bracts to terminate in the teeth and spines. The finer venation forms a reticulate structure in the membrane between the primary venation.

=== Palaeocarpinus sikhotealinensis Akhmetiev & Manchester ===
The second Sikhote-Alin species, Palaeocarpinus sikhotealinensis is known from a series of isolated bracts, of which only two show nutlet details. The nutlets are 7 mm × 5 mm (1/4 in × 3/16 in) in height and width, with each side the nutlets showing ten wiggly ridges on each face. The nutlet apices show having a style present, though the styles are fragmentary. The two leaf-like bracts are equal in size and have lobed sides along with an ovate outline. Several lobes are present on each margin of the bract, typically plunging between 1/3 and 1/2 of the way to the bract base. Overall the bracts are between 7–9 mm (1/4–3/8 in) wide and 10–12 mm (3/8–1/2 in) tall, with the lobes tipped with spines. Spines are also present along the sides of the lobes, and all the spines are supplied by veins. The palmate primary veins spread from the base and terminate in the apical spines of the bract lobes and tip, while secondary veins forking off the primaries supply the lateral spines on the lobe sides. Fruiting heads are unknown.

=== Palaeocarpinus stonebergae Pigg, Manchester & Wehr ===
P. stonebergae was initially described from only singular fruits, but a few incomplete infructescences have since been discovered. The known sections are between 3.3–7.5 mm (1/8–5/16 in) wide and 13.8–14.6 mm (9/16–9/16 in) long and bear the densely packed fruits as pairs between short internodes, with a total of 11 fruits on the largest infructescence fossil. The 3–8 mm (1/8–5/16 in) tall by 3.4–14 mm (1/8–9/16 in) wide individual fruits are accompanied by a pair of deeply lobed spiny bracts with highly reduced membrane. The major veins run up the approximately ten narrow lobes, which occasionally fork, and frequently end in at the spiny tips. As with other species, the rounded elliptical nutlet has a forked style at the nut tip and has four to eight ribs. The nutles are between 1.5–4.5 mm (1/16–3/16 in) wide and 1.1–5 mm (1/16–3/16 in) tall. Based on the notably reduced membrane, spiny lobe tips and preservation as single fruits the means of dispersal was possibly clinging to passing animals.

=== Undescribed Palaeocarpinus fossils ===
In the material collected by Lawrence Lambe's 1908 collecting expedition though central British Columbia, David P. Penhallow reported additional Carpolithes dentata fossils. Penhallow deemed the three Horsefly, two Quilchena, and two or three Tranquille River fossils as all equivalent to Dawsons original Carpolithes dentata specimen. In total between seven and eight additional fossils were noted, but have been largely ignored since the original mention by Penhallow. Pigg, Manchester, and Wehr added the report of unplaced fruits in the Driftiwood Shales near Smithers, British Columbia, the Golden Promise site, UWBM B4876, Outside Republic, and Corkscrew Mountain, UWBM B6494, near Toroda, Washington. They considered these fruits as not placeable in the species known in the area at the time, and did not name new species from them. None of the unplaced fossils noted in 2003 were discussed by Correa and Manchester (2021).

== Ecology ==
Palaeocarpinus species fruits are fairly consistently found associated with pollen cones adapted for wind dispersal, leading paleontologists to feel the genus was wind pollinated as with many modern members of Betulaceae. The bracts around the nutlets fall into two major morphological groups, ones with enlarged membrane areas and smaller teeth or spines, and ones with enlarged teeth and spines and reduced membrane area. Given the morphologic variation, dispersal of the fruits within the species was suggested by Correa-Narvaez and Manchester (2021) to vary between species. With three of the species, the fruits dispersed singly, while in another three they dispersed in fused cymle pairs. In P. dakotensis the cymle pairs are fused to the fruiting and the head as a whole was dropped. They discussed the species which have a high bract area to nutlet size, P. aspinosa, P. dentata, P. laciniata, P. pacifica, and P. pterabaratra as being possibly wind-distributed, dropping from the parent plant and fluttering down in wing currents to land away from the parent. Conversely, P. dakotensis, P. joffrensis, P. orientalis, P. sikhotealinensis, P. parva, P. stonebergea all have highly toothed to spined bracts that could have served several purposes. The spines and teeth may have been a deterrent to prevent seed consumption by birds and mammals, they also could be a development for the clinging to fur or feathers and being dispersed. Some specimens in these species show slight hooking to the tooth and spine tips which would assist in the bur-like attachment to animals passing by. A third group of species, P. barksdaleae, P. pteravestigia and maybe P. borealis land between the two groups morphologically, having teeth and membrane, but not having either significantly dominating the bract.

== Paleoenvironment ==
The distribution of Palaeocarpinus species follows a similar trend to that seen in the living species of Corylus and Carpinus. Fossil sites are usually from an upland temperate or humid environment along lakes, streams, or rivers. The Rocky Mountain and Great Plains sites are all from various river system environments such as flood plain, point bar, and overbank areas. These rivers were likely affiliated with the ongoing Laramide Orogeny resulting in mountain building across Western North America. The Okanagan Highlands preserves a series of upland lake system surrounded by a mixed conifer–broadleaf forests with nearby volcanism. Sites in the Okanagan Highlands are grouped around a series of upland temperate lakes stretching 1,000 km (1,000,000 m) southwest from Central British Columbia to Northeast central Washington. Volcanics from the Challis Arc and associated uplift and graben formation characterize the lakes. The sites in Oregon are a mix of volcanics and riverine systems, with the fossils associated with river or lake areas where fish were present.

The European sites are from a mix of depositional environments. The Cold Ash Quarry site shows typical silt lenses of clays and silts plus cross bedding that are all indicators of a river system. In contrast, the Menat fossils are preserved in a maar, a shallow lake environment in an infilled volcanic crater. The waters of the lake were mineral rich and preserved the flora from the surrounding crater rim hills. To the north, the Spitzbergen site has a mix of shales and sandstones with associated plant and mollusk fossils suggesting an estuary or lake delta environment.

The three Asian sites are not as well defined as the others, with only the Puer Ridge site generally explored. While both the Alti and Buoy Bay sites are in silt and claystones, the depositional nature of them is unreported. With the Bouy Bay site the locality is noted to have likely been a higher elevation or warm temperate site, and the Alti was likely a humid temperate environment with a deciduous forest close to a coast. Puer Ridge was reported to be an intermountain depression with areas of swamp.
