= Jack Sepkoski =

University of Chicago paleontologist (1948–1999)

Joseph John Sepkoski Jr. (July 26, 1948 – May 1, 1999) was a University of Chicago paleontologist. Sepkoski studied the fossil record and the diversity of life on Earth. Sepkoski and David Raup produced a new understanding of extinction events, by developing a statistical approach to the study of taxonomic diversification. They suggested that the extinction of dinosaurs 66 mya was part of a cycle of mass extinctions that may have occurred every 26 million years. But their most important contribution was the identification of the "Big 5" mass extinctions, events that have shaped the evolution of life on earth.

== Life and work ==
Sepkoski was born in Presque Isle, Maine. He graduated in 1966 from Christian Brothers Academy (DeWitt, New York) in Syracuse, New York. In 1970, Sepkoski received a B.S. degree, magna cum laude, from the University of Notre Dame. Under Stephen Jay Gould he earned a Ph.D. in geological sciences from Harvard University in 1977. His Ph.D. was on the field geology and paleontology of the Black Hills of South Dakota. From 1974 to 1978, Sepkoski taught at the University of Rochester. In 1978, he joined the University of Chicago and became a professor in 1986. Sepkoski was also a research associate at the Field Museum of Natural History in Chicago. He died of heart failure related to high blood pressure at the age of 50.

Sepkoski is perhaps best known for his global compendia of marine animal families and genera, data sets that continue to motivate a tremendous amount of paleobiological research. Sepkoski himself explored his compendium very thoroughly. In 1981, he identified three great Evolutionary Faunas in the marine animal fossil record. Each of his Evolutionary Faunas, the Cambrian, Paleozoic, and Modern Faunas, is composed of Linnean classes of animals that have covarying diversity patterns, characteristic rates of turnover, and broadly similar ecologies. Most importantly, they sequentially replaced one another as dominant groups during the Phanerozoic. Sepkoski modeled the Evolutionary Faunas using three coupled logistic functions, but the underlying drivers of the prominent shift in taxonomic composition represented by the three faunas remains unknown.

Sepkoski was married to paleontologist Christine Janis, a specialist in fossil mammals. His son (from a previous marriage) is the historian of science David Sepkoski.

== Awards ==
- (1983). Charles Schuchert Award, Paleontological Society
- Elected foreign member of the Polish Academy of Sciences

== Selected publications ==
- Sepkoski, J. John Jr. (1978). "A kinetic model of Phanerozoic taxonomic diversity. I. Analysis of marine orders". Paleobiology. 4 (3): 223–251. doi:10.1017/s0094837300005972. JSTOR 2400203. S2CID 87102033.
- Sepkoski, J. John Jr. (1979). "A kinetic model of Phanerozoic taxonomic diversity. II. Early Phanerozoic families and multiple equilibria". Paleobiology. 5 (3): 222–251. doi:10.1017/s0094837300006539. JSTOR 2400257. S2CID 89475468.
- Sepkoski, J. John Jr. (1981). "A factor analytic description of the Phanerozoic marine fossil record". Paleobiology. 7 (1): 36–53. doi:10.1017/s0094837300003778. JSTOR 2400639. S2CID 133114885.
- Raup, David M.; Sepkoski, J. John Jr. (19 March 1982). "Mass extinctions in the marine fossil record". Science. 215 (4539): 1501–3. Bibcode:1982Sci...215.1501R. doi:10.1126/science.215.4539.1501. PMID 17788674. S2CID 43002817.
- Sepkoski, J. John Jr. (1984). "A kinetic model of Phanerozoic taxonomic diversity. III Post-Paleozoic families and mass extinctions". Paleobiology. 10 (2): 246–267. doi:10.1017/s0094837300008186. JSTOR 2400399. S2CID 85595559.
- Raup, David M.; Sepkoski, J. John Jr. (Feb 1984). "Periodicity of extinctions in the geologic past". Proceedings of the National Academy of Sciences of the United States of America. 81 (3): 801–805. Bibcode:1984PNAS...81..801R. doi:10.1073/pnas.81.3.801. PMC 344925. PMID 6583680.
- Sepkoski, J. John Jr. (1988). "Alpha, beta, or gamma: where does all the diversity go?". Paleobiology. 14 (3): 221–234. doi:10.1017/S0094837300011969. JSTOR 2400884. PMID 11542147. S2CID 2826581.
- Sepkoski, J. John Jr. (1996). "Patterns of Phanerozoic extinction: a perspective from global data bases". In Otto H. Walliser (ed.). Global Events and Event Stratigraphy. Berlin: Springer. pp. 35–51. doi:10.1007/978-3-642-79634-0_4. ISBN 978-3-642-79636-4.
- Sepkoski, J. John Jr. (2002). "A compendium of fossil marine animal genera". Bulletins of American Paleontology. 363. Ithaca, NY: Paleontological Research Institution: 1–560. ISBN 978-0-87710-450-6.
