= Katherine Van Winkle Palmer =

American paleontologist (1895–1982)

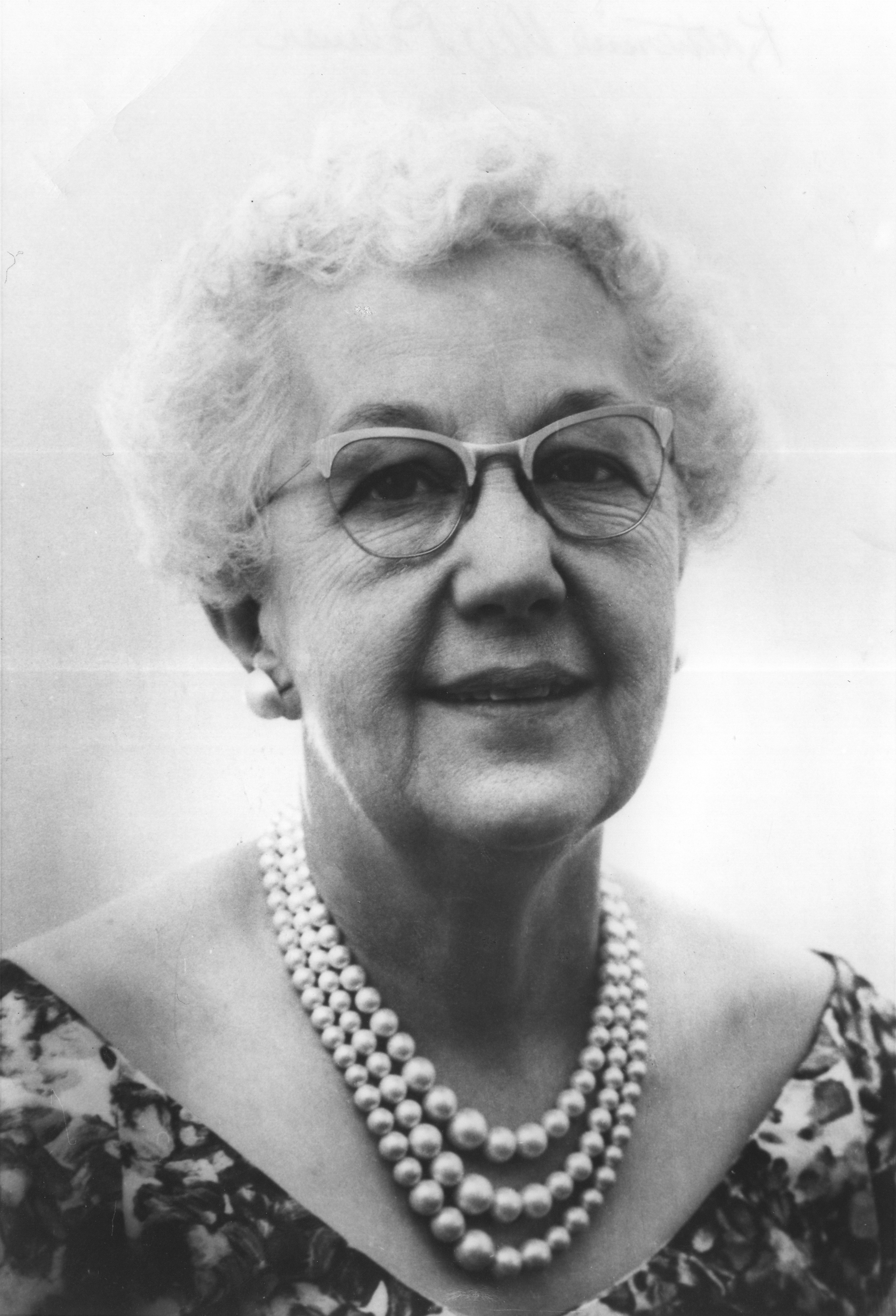
- Born: February 5, 1895; Oakville, Washington, US
- Died: September 12, 1982 (aged 87)
- Education: Cornell University
- Alma mater: Cornell University; University of Washington
- Spouse: Ephraim Laurence Palmer
- Children: Laurence Van Winkle Palmer; Richard Robert Palmer
- Scientific career
- Fields: Paleontology

Katherine Van Winkle Palmer (February 5, 1895 – September 12, 1982) was an American paleontologist, studying fossils from the Cenozoic Era, and an accomplished geologist. Palmer is recognized for her field/doctoral study on Veneracean lamellibranches, a class of molluska that include clams, scallops and oysters. Palmer was a director of the Paleontological Research Institution (PRI) in New York. During Palmer's time as the director of the PRI, she oversaw the publication of numerous Bulletins of American Paleontology as well as several issues of Palaeontographica Americana. Palmer is well known for her field study and collection of mollusks that took place in several parts of the world, most notably in the Gulf of Mexico. Katherine was married to Ephraim L. Palmer and had two children together, Laurence and Richard Palmer.

== Early life ==
Katherine Evangeline Hilton Van Winkle Palmer was an only child born to Jacob Van Winkle, a doctor, and Mary Edith Hilton Van Winkle, a Canadian-born nurse. Jacob Van Winkle was one of the "First Twelve Men" who helped form the first official representative body of New York and New Jersey in 1641.

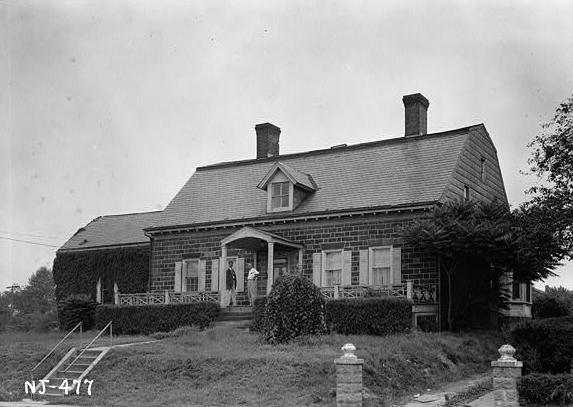
Palmer's childhood home in Oakville, Washington

Palmer Grew up in the small town of Oakville, Washington, sharing a close relationship with her father who introduced her to the outdoors, and who was an important contributing factor in her pursuit of the sciences. The two of them would go outdoors and collect fossil mollusks. It was during these adventures that Palmer found her love for science and a passion for fossils. As she said later in life, "I knew fossils as a child, so by the time I went to the University of Washington I knew I wanted to study geology."

In childhood, she attended various local schools and became the only female member of her graduating class to eventually go to college. Katherine was accepted into the University of Washington where she studied paleontology, the study of the history of life on Earth based on fossils.

== Education ==
Katherine attended the University of Washington to study paleontology under the mentorship of Professor Charles E. Weaver. She worked as Weaver's research assistant and investigated the largely unknown paleontology of the state of Washington.

Palmer completed her fieldwork during 1916–1917 for her senior thesis on Age Determinants within Faunal Provinces. She wrote her thesis on the Oligocene fossils found in the Chehalis Valley in Washington. In 1918, Palmer graduated with her Bachelor of Science degree from the University of Washington, and published her senior thesis during that same year. She was a member of the Alpha Delta Pi chapter. For a short period, Katherine was working as a post-graduate lab assistant under Dr. Charles E. Weaver, who focused his study on Tertiary fauna. With Dr. Weaver's recommendation, Palmer applied for and received a Goldwyn Smith Fellowship (1918–1920) to accomplish graduate work at Cornell University under the East Coast Paleogene expert, Gilbert D. Harris.

Following this, from 1921 to 1925 Palmer held an assistantship in Paleontology and Historical Geology to continue her work with Professor Harris helping him create the Paleontological Research Institution. Katherine wanted to become a student of Harris's because at the time, not only was he the Paleogene expert on the East Coast, but the only professor in the Geology department who accepted women as students. Palmer printed out her thesis by typesetting and making the ink plates herself on Harris's very own printing press.

After graduation, Palmer went to Ithaca, New York, where she had been awarded a scholarship for graduate study at Cornell University. While at Cornell, she was a founder and vice-president of Sigma Delta Epsilon (now Graduate Women in Science). She continued her education at Cornell University, where she received her PhD in 1925.

== After graduation ==
As graduation arrived, Katherine received a Hecksher Fellowship from 1925 to 1927 to proceed with her work with Professor Harris on Paleogene fossils. Several years later, Harris created the cornerstone for Paleontological Research Institution (PRI) in 1932, and Palmer was alongside him. Palmer actively worked with in the PRI and served with the board of directors. During her time with PRI, Palmer accompanied Harris on expeditions and continued to publish her work. Her work was able to be published thanks to her association with PRI. Palmer left the legacy of her student days at Cornell University in the Sigma Delta Epsilon organization, which she founded in 1921 . At the time, this was the only national organization for women in science and later Palmer would become the national president. During her long life Palmer had the opportunity to travel to many parts of the world for field study and collecting fossil Mollusca. Palmer was most notable for her work in the Gulf of Mexico but she also travelled and worked in New Zealand and the West Indies.

== Career ==
In 1935, Palmer was appointed Fellow of the Geological Society of America. Palmer was also president of the Malacological Society, an organization dedicated to the research and preservation of mollusks. The same year that Palmer died (1982), she published the first history of the PRI, securing her own, as well as the PRI's, legacy in print. Palmer's research produced more than 150 publications, including Gastropoda of the Claibornian Mid-Eocene of the Southern United States (1937), The Mollusca of the Jackson Eocene of the Mississippi Embayment (Sabine River to Alabama River) (1946), and Catalogue of the Paleocene, and Eocene Mollusca of the Southern and Eastern United States (1965), to name a few. As well as conducting field studies in the United States, Palmer conducted research in the Gulf of Mexico, New Zealand, and the West Indies. Palmer took on many paleontological projects such as fossil catalogs which few other paleontologists covered, but were vital to the field of paleontology. She identified and described more than 80 new taxonomic species, most of which were classified as a form of Mollusk. Palmer's systematic classification and descriptions of these species are considered a gold standard by many who study this type of Paleontology.

== Paleontological Research Institution ==
Palmer and Harris established the PRI together in 1932, became president of the Board of Trustees from 1936 to 1937, and in 1952 she replaced Harris as director when he fell ill, a post she occupied until 1978. Palmer worked as the Director of PRI until 1978. While in this position, Palmer oversaw the publication of 150 Bulletins of American Paleontology (BAP), which Harris founded in 1895, as well as 20 issues of Palaeontographica Americana founded in 1916. Palmer was also the trustee of both of these publications. Throughout the first 21 years as director, Palmer edited 137 numbers (28 volumes) of BAP and 20 numbers (4 volumes) of Palaeontographica Americana. Palmer also oversaw the publication of 150 Bulletins of American Paleontology (BAP) issues as well as 20 issues of Palaeontographica Americana. Under Palmer's leadership PRI gained international acclaim among the paleontological community for the institutions expansive documentation of a variety of different pursuits, and the contributions PRI gave to the study of Paleontology. Palmer was known for her commitment to helping and recruiting local women into the PRI, allowing the volunteers to do much of the curator work while allowing them to gain experience in a scientific field.

Due to Gilbert Harris's illness, and before his death on December 4, 1952, the board appointed Palmer the director of the PRI in April 1952. She was the logical successor as she had been associated with the institution right from the laying of the cornerstone some 20 years earlier. She also managed to continue her research on Paleontology and take care of her family. Palmer continued her work as the Director of PRI until 1978, even though her health started to significantly deteriorate during the 1970s. In 1972 Palmer became the first woman in history to receive the highest honor in American Paleontology, the Paleontological Society Medal, she also received an honorary degree from Tulane University in 1978, as well as the Western Society of Malacologists Award in 1974 in recognition of her lifelong contributions to geology. From letters received after her retirement it is clear that she was a widely loved and highly respected scientist whose influence had a lasting effect on her students and colleagues.

In 1993 the Paleontological research institution established the Katherine Palmer Award for amateur contributions to paleontology.

== Personal life ==
While still a graduate student at Cornell University, Katherine Van Winkle met Ephraim L. Palmer, who was a professor of rural education and nature study. Katherine and Ephraim were married in 1921. The Palmer family had two children: Laurence Van Winkle Palmer, born in 1923, and Richard Robin Palmer, born in 1930. The eldest son, Laurence was unfortunately struck with a Streptococcus infection at the age of four, which left him with severe arthritis and eventually took his life at the age of 17.

The couple became famous for their hospitality, often hosting visiting scholars of Geology and Rural Education from around the world. Palmer's husband, Ephraim Laurence Palmer died on December 18, 1970. Their youngest son Richard, commonly known as Robin Palmer, went on to outlive Katherine and died in 2010 after a life of prolific political activism, including an attempt to firebomb a bank in New York City as part of a failed Weather Underground plot.

Palmer died on September 12, 1982.

== Awards and honors ==
Following are some of Palmer's awards and honors.

- National Honorary Member of Sigma Delta Epsilon/Graduate Women in Science (SDE/GWIS) (1971)
- Fellow of the Geological Society of America (1935)
- Honorary Member of the Society of Economic Paleontologists and Mineralogists (1966)
- First female recipient of the Paleontological Society Medal in 1972 for her work on Tertiary Mollusca: widely acknowledged as paleontology's highest professional honor in the United States (1972)
- Award for "outstanding contributions to the study of Mollusca" from the Western Society of Malacologists (1974)
- The Alpha Chapter of SDE/GWIS named their first Award for Excellence after Palmer (1978)
- The Katherine Palmer Award for amateur contributions to paleontology is presented each year by the Paleontological Research Institution (1993)
- "Paleontology is Alive and Well: A Symposium in Honor of Dr. Katherine Van Winkle Palmer" was held at Tulane University in 1978, which included an Honorary Doctor of Science presentation from the university (1978)
- Honorary Life Member of the American Malacological Union
