= Ostryopsis nobilis =

Conservation status
- Vulnerable (IUCN 3.1)

Scientific classification
- Kingdom: Plantae
- Clade: Embryophytes
- Clade: Tracheophytes
- Clade: Angiosperms
- Clade: Eudicots
- Clade: Rosids
- Order: Fagales
- Family: Betulaceae
- Genus: Ostryopsis
- Species: O. nobilis

Binomial name
- Ostryopsis nobilis Balf.f. & W.W.Sm. 1914

Synonyms
- Corylus davidiana var. cinerascens Franch. Ostryopsis davidiana var. cinerascens Franch.

Species of plant

Ostryopsis nobilis (Chinese: 滇虎榛; pinyin: dian hu zhen) is a shrub species in the genus Ostryopsis found in China. It is an endemic Chinese medicinal plant. It forms thickets on sunny mountain slopes between 1,500 and 3,000 m. It is native to southwestern Sichuan and northwestern Yunnan.

Two cyclic diarylheptanoids, named ostryopsitrienol and ostryopsitriol, can be isolated from the stems of O. nobilis.
