= Kardiasperma =

Kardiasperma Temporal range: Middle Eocene, 45–43 Mya

Scientific classification
- Kingdom: Plantae
- Clade: Tracheophytes
- Clade: Angiosperms
- Clade: Eudicots
- Clade: Rosids
- Order: Fagales
- Family: Betulaceae
- Subfamily: Coryloideae
- Genus: †Kardiasperma; Manchester
- Species: †K. parvum

Binomial name
- †Kardiasperma parvum Manchester

Extinct genus of flowering plants

Kardiasperma is an extinct genus of flowering plants in the hazelnut family, Betulaceae, containing the single species Kardiasperma parvum. The species is solely known from the middle Eocene sediments exposed in north central Oregon and was first described from a series of isolated fossil nuts in cherts.

== History and classification ==
Kardiasperma parvum has been identified from a single location in the Clarno Formation, the Clarno nut beds, type locality for both the formation and the species. The nut beds are approximately 3 kilometres (1.9 mi) east of the unincorporated community of Clarno, Oregon, and currently considered to be middle Eocene in age, based on averaging zircon fission track radiometric dating which yielded an age of 43.6 and 43.7 ± 10 million years ago and argon–argon dating radiometric dating which yielded a 36.38 ± 1.31 to 46.8 ± 3.36 Mya date. The average of the dates resulted in an age range of 45 to 43 Mya. The beds are composed of silica and calcium carbonate cemented tuffaceous sandstones, siltstones, and conglomerates which preserve either a lake delta environment, or alternatively periodic floods and volcanic mudflows preserved with hot spring activity.

The genus and species was described from a series of type specimens, the holotype specimen USNM 435077, which is currently preserved in the paleobotanical collections of the National Museum of Natural History in Washington, D.C., and thirty-seven paratype specimens. Eighteen of the paratypes are also in the national Museum collections, while three are in the University of Florida collections, and the remaining four specimens are part of the University of California Museum of Paleontology. The fossils were part of a group of approximately 20,000 specimens collected from 1942 to 1989 by Thomas Bones, Alonzo W. Hancock, R. A. Scott, Steven R. Manchester, and a number of high school students.

The Kardiasperma specimens were studied by paleobotanist Steven R. Manchester of the University of Florida. He published his 1994 type description for K. parvum in the journal Palaeontographica Americana. In his type description Manchester noted the generic name is derived from the Greek words Kardia meaning "heart" and sperma meaning "seed". The specific epithet parvum, Latin for "small, was chosen in reference to the small size of the locule casts. The fossils are noted to be nearly identical to fossils of the related and also extinct Betulaceae genus Palaeocarpinus from North Dakota. The two genera are separated on the basis of the notable size difference between the Palaeocarpinus and Kardiasperma fossils and the lack of a surrounding bract on the Kardiasperma. In 2021, compression fossils from the Clarno formation outside the nutbeds were described by Julian E. Correa-Narvaez and Steven Manchester as Palaeocarpinus parva, a very small fruited species that closely matches the dimensions of K. parvum.

== Description ==
The locules of Kardiasperma parvum are generally obcordate, with quadrilateral symmetry, a rounded base and a bluntly pointed apex. The locules have an overall length ranging between 1.3–2.4 millimetres (0.051–0.094 in) and a maximum width between 1.0 to 2.0 millimetres (0.039 to 0.079 in). The exterior surface has a smooth texture and a keel running along the major plane of symmetry, while a groove runs along the middle of the locule along the minor plane of symmetry from the base to the apex.
