= Ceratosporella =

Scientific classification
- Kingdom: Fungi
- Division: Ascomycota
- Class: incertae sedis
- Order: incertae sedis
- Family: incertae sedis
- Genus: Ceratosporella; F. von Höhnel, 1923

Species
- Ceratosporella bicornis; Ceratosporella compacta; Ceratosporella deviata; Ceratosporella disticha; Ceratosporella novae-zelandiae; Ceratosporella stipitata

Genus of fungi

Ceratosporella is a genus of fungi. Some species interact with species of trees in the families Betulaceae and Fagaceae (Carpinus betulus, Castanea sativa). Ceratosporella disticha can be isolated from decaying leaves of the palm Arenga westerhautii in Malaysia.
