= Ceratosporella bicornis =

Scientific classification
- Kingdom: Fungi
- Division: Ascomycota
- Class: incertae sedis
- Order: incertae sedis
- Family: incertae sedis
- Genus: Ceratosporella
- Species: C. bicornis

Binomial name
- Ceratosporella bicornis (Morgan) Höhn. (1923)

Synonyms
- Ceratosporella bicorne (Morgan) Höhn. (1923); Ceratosporella elegans F. von Höhnel, 1919; Triposporium bicorne Morgan 1895

Species of fungus

Ceratosporella bicornis is a species of fungus.
