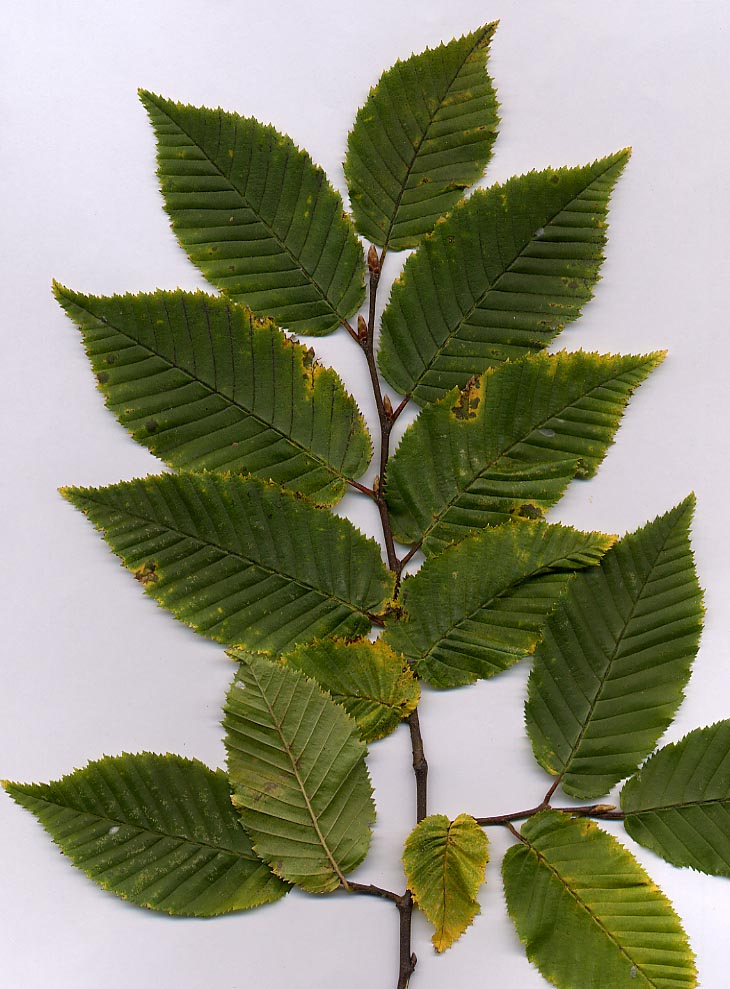
- Carpinus betulus foliage

Scientific classification
- Kingdom: Plantae
- Clade: Tracheophytes
- Clade: Angiosperms
- Clade: Eudicots
- Clade: Rosids
- Order: Fagales
- Family: Betulaceae
- Subfamily: Coryloideae; Koehne

Genera
- †Asterocarpinus; Carpinus; †Coryloides; Corylus; †Cranea; †Kardiasperma; Ostrya; Ostryopsis; †Palaeocarpinus

= Coryloideae =

Subfamily of flowering plants

Coryloideae is a subfamily in the woody angiosperm family Betulaceae, commonly known as the birch family, and consists of four genera - Corylus L., Ostryopsis Decne., Carpinus L., and Ostrya Scop. These deciduous trees and shrubs are primarily distributed in the boreal and cool temperate zones of the Northern Hemisphere, with the majority occurring in Asia, many occurring in North America and a few species occurring as far south as South America. Synapomorphies such reduced staminate flowers, advanced wood anatomy features, and the presence of spermidines in pollen define the Coryloideae.

While the division of the extant members of the Betulaceae into six genera is uncontroversial, the placement of these genera into higher taxonomic ranks and the level of these ranks are debated. Extensive studies on the basis of ribulose- 1,5-biphosphate carboxylase (rbcL) sequences, internal transcribed spacer (ITS) sequences, morphology, and various combined data sets support the dichotomy of the Betulaceae into two major clades. A few authors have divided the genera into two families, the Betulaceae (Alnus, Betula) and Corylaceae (Carpinus, Ostrya, Corylus, Ostryopsis). Many modern authors recognize two separate clades within the family, either as tribes Betuleae and Coryleae or subfamilies Betuloideae and Coryloideae. There has also been debate on the further division of the Coryloideae into two tribes: Coryleae (Corylus) and Carpineae (Ostryopsis, Carpinus, Ostrya).

== Fossil record ==
Based on distribution patterns of fossil and extant representatives (Corylus, Carpinus, and Ostrya) across temperate latitudes of the Northern Hemisphere, the Betulaceae probably originated in the temperate zones of Laurasia during the Cretaceous. The pollen record also suggests that the Betuloideae predate the Coryloideae. Alnus and Betula differentiated as early 80 Mya during the Santonian in the Cretaceous. The earliest pollen grains of the Coryloideae, belonging to Corylus, appeared 67 Mya during the Maestrichtian in the Paleocene. Carpinus and Ostrya appeared later, 60 Mya and 41 Mya respectively; Ostryopsis has not yet been confirmed by similar fossil remains.

== Tribe Coryleae ==
Corylus, commonly known as the hazels, is the sole living genus in the tribe Coryleae, and considered the sister group to tribe Carpinieae. Corylus is placed as the sister group to the remaining Coryloideae because it shares plesiomorphic character states with the Betuloideae such as bisexual inflorescences, staminate flowers with a perianth, a haploid chromosome number of 14, and nonoperculate pollen apertures with thickened endexine. The monophyly of Corylus species is defined by several morphological synapomorphies, including the large animal-dispersed nuts, hypogeal seed germination, and filaments that are completely divided longitudinally. The genus is recognized as having either two or three main divisions as sections or subgenera, with sections often being divided into subsections. Some authors divide it into subgenera Acanthochlamys, Phyllochlamys, and Siphonochlamys. Others divide the genus into two sections (Acanthochlamys and Corylus) with section Corylus into three subsections (Corylus, Colurnae, and Siphonochlamys).

== Tribe Carpinieae ==
Tribe Carpinieae, containing Ostryopsis–Carpinus–Ostrya is defined by staminate flowers without a perianth, operculate pollen apertures with endexine not thickening at apertural region, a base chromosome number of 8, and a plicate leaf vernation pattern. Several characters, including glabrous receptacle of staminate flowers, smooth nutlet surface, and secondary veins extending directly into leaf teeth, differentiate Ostryopsis from Carpinus and Ostrya.

Ostryopsis is often considered the sister group of Carpinus and Ostrya, but its phylogenetic position is debated. A close relationship with Corylus is supported by wood anatomy characters and chloroplast gene sequences. The placement of Ostryopsis as sister to the Ostrya-Carpinus clade is supported by a phylogenetic tree based on chloroplast DNA data but placement basal to Corylus is supported in an ITS-based tree.

Carpinus is often considered sister to Ostrya. DNA sequences suggest that Carpinus might have differentiated from the extinct genus Palaeocarpinus. Carpinus is defined by several morphological characters including presence of pistillodes in the male florets, and leafy bracts subtending the flowers and fruits. Carpinus is divided into two sections, Distegocarpus and Carpinus, based on floral bracts, infructescences, and scales. Section Carpinus is further divided into three subsections – Carpinus, Monbeigianae and Polyneurae. The monophyly of the genus is debatable. ITS data suggests the genus is paraphyletic while chloroplast DNA and nuclear 5S spacer data support it as monophyletic. Carpinus may also be considered paraphyletic depending on the placement of Ostrya.

Ostrya has a close relationship with Carpinus, which is strongly supported by ITS and rbcL sequences and morphological and combined data from several studies. Although both genera share similar inflorescences, pollen grains and vessels with simple perforations, they differ in leaf epidermal characters and their infructescence bracts, which are radially symmetrical and inflated bladder-like in Ostrya and are open and flat in Carpinus.

While the close relationship of Carpinus and Ostrya is supported by data, the monophyly of the two genera has remained controversial. Some studies have nested Ostrya within Carpinus between sections Carpinus and Distegocarpus on the basis of ITS data or placed Ostrya as a basal grade to the Carpinus clade on the basis of chloroplast DNA data.

== Sources ==
- Bousquet, Jean; Strauss, Steven H.; Li, Peng (1992). "Complete Congruence Between Morphological And Rbcl-Based Molecular Phylogenies In Birches And Related Species (Betulaceae)". Molecular Biology and Evolution. 9 (6): 1076–1088. doi:10.1093/oxfordjournals.molbev.a040779.
