= Ephraim Laurence Palmer =

American science educator (1888–1970)

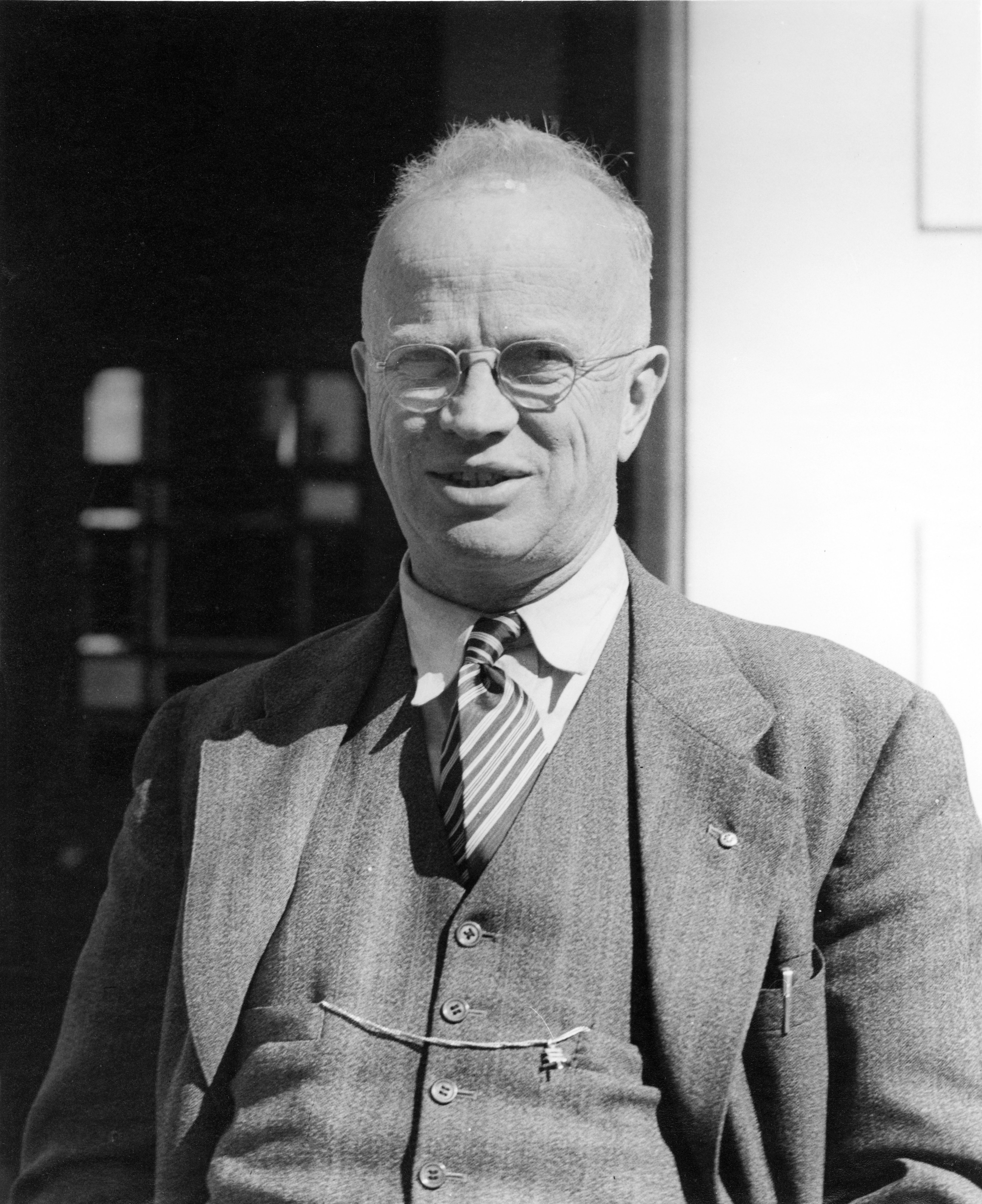
- Palmer in 1950
- Born: July 8, 1888; McGraw, New York, USA
- Died: December 18, 1970 (aged 82)
- Education: Cornell University
- Spouse: Katherine Van Winkle Palmer (m. 1921)
- Children: Laurence Van Winkle Palmer; Richard Robert Palmer
- Parents: Ephraim Clark Palmer (father); Laura Lincoln Darrow (mother)

Ephraim Laurence Palmer (July 8, 1888 – December 18, 1970) was an American science educator and conservationist. He served as president of several national organizations, including: the National Council of Supervisors of Nature Study and Gardening; American Nature Study Society; Department of Science Instruction of the National Education Association (now National Science Teachers Association); and the National Association of Biology Teachers. He was director of the National Audubon Society (1946–1950) and director of Conservation Education of the National Wildlife Federation (1950–1956). He directed nature programs for the Boy Scouts of America for over 30 years, and was awarded the Silver Beaver and Silver Buffalo Awards for his service. He edited the Cornell Rural School Leaflet for 34 years, and was elected Fellow of the American Association for the Advancement of Science and the Rochester Academy of Science. He was known for books such as Fieldbook of Natural History (1949), the weekly radio show This Week in Nature of the 1940s and 1950s, and his writings in Nature Magazine.

Palmer was born in McGraw, New York, on July 8, 1888, to Laura Lincoln (née Darrow) and Ephraim Clark Palmer. He attended Cortland State Normal School, and in 1908 enrolled in Cornell University, graduating with an A.B. in 1911 and M.A. in 1913. He taught at Iowa State Teachers College before returning to Cornell to earn a PhD in systematic botany in 1917. In 1921 he married Katherine Van Winkle, a paleontologist. The couple had two children, however their eldest son Laurence Van Winkle Palmer (born 1923), nicknamed "Punky", contracted a Streptococcus infection at the age of 4 which eventually took his life at the age of 17. Their younger son Richard Robert Palmer (born 1930), also known as "Robin", would later join the Weather Underground and served time in prison for attempting to firebomb a bank in New York City.

== Books ==
- Camp Fire Nature Guide, Slingerland-Comstock Publishing Company, 1925.
- Camp Fires and Camp Cookery, Slingerland-Comstock Publishing Company, 1925. LCCN 88-199286
- The Fieldbook of Nature Study, Slingerland-Comstock Publishing Company, 1925 and revised 1928. LCCN 29-8070
- The Nature Almanac (as editor with Arthur Newton Pack), American Nature Association, 1927 LCCN 28-14930; 1930.
- Nature Magazine’s Guide to Science Teaching, American Nature Association, 1936. LCCN 36-23252
- Fieldbook of Mammals, E. P. Dutton and Company, 1957 LCCN 57-8974 ASIN B000HF7KZQ
- Fossils, Heath and Company, 1965
