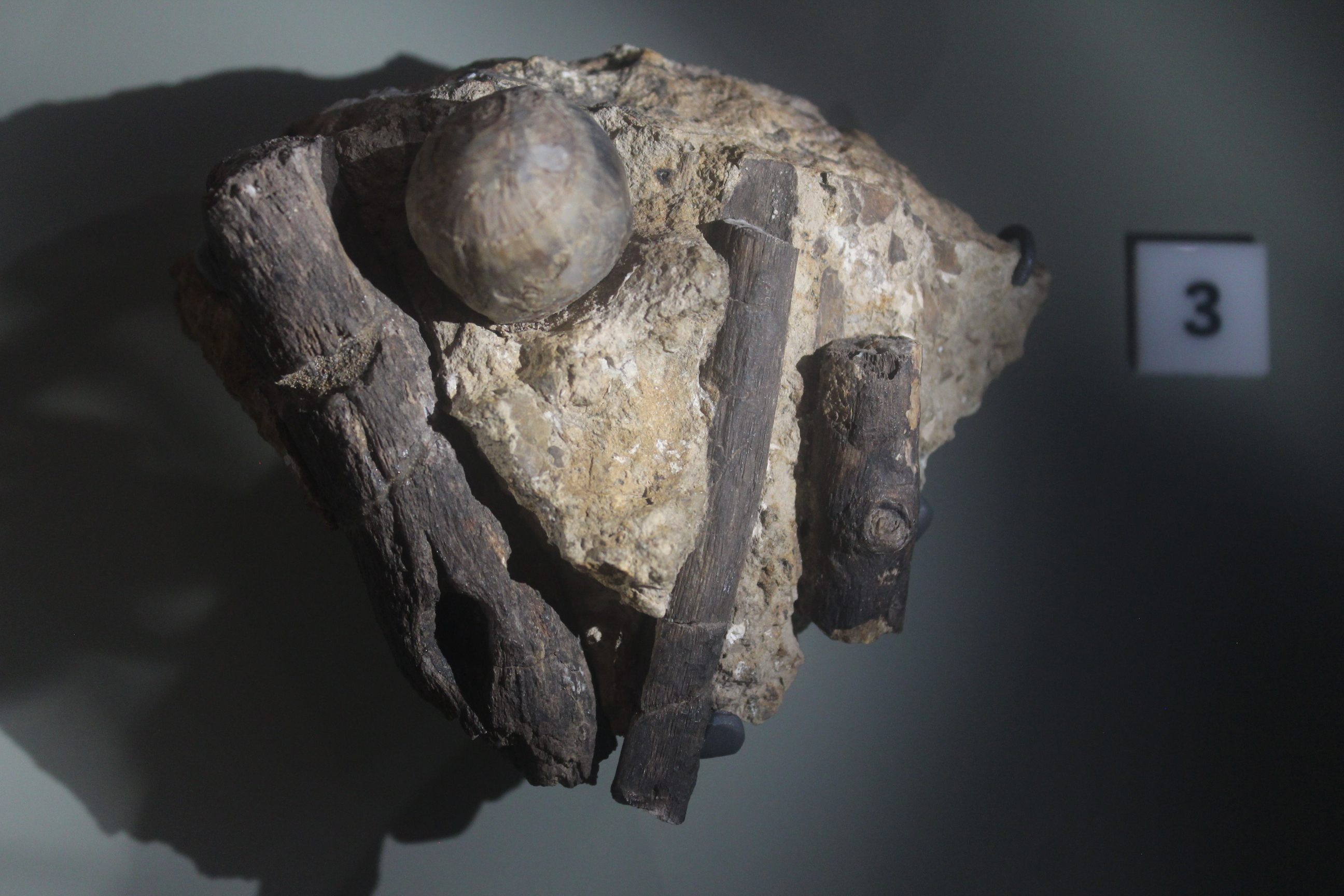
- C. hancockii fossil, National Museum of Natural History

Scientific classification
- Kingdom: Plantae
- Clade: Tracheophytes
- Clade: Angiosperms
- Clade: Eudicots
- Clade: Rosids
- Order: Fagales
- Family: Betulaceae
- Subfamily: Coryloideae
- Genus: †Coryloides; Manchester
- Species: †C. hancockii

Binomial name
- †Coryloides hancockii Manchester

= Coryloides =

Coryloides Temporal range: Middle Eocene, 45–43 Mya

Extinct genus of flowering plants

Coryloides is an extinct genus of flowering plants in the hazelnut family, Betulaceae, containing the single species Coryloides hancockii. The species is solely known from the middle Eocene sediments exposed in north central Oregon and was first described from a series of isolated fossil nuts in cherts.

== History and classification ==
Coryloides hancockii has been identified from a single location in the Clarno Formation, the Clarno nut beds, type locality for both the formation and the species. The nut beds are approximately 3 kilometres (1.9 mi) east of the unincorporated community of Clarno, Oregon, and currently considered to be middle Eocene in age, based on averaging zircon fission track radiometric dating which yielded an age of 43.6 and 43.7 ± 10 million years ago and Argon–argon dating radiometric dating which yielded a 36.38 ± 1.31 to 46.8 ± 3.36 Mya date. The average of the dates resulted in an age range of 45 to 43 Mya. The beds are composed of silica and calcium carbonate cemented tuffaceous sandstones, siltstones, and conglomerates which preserve either a lake delta environment, or alternatively periodic floods and volcanic mudflows preserved with hot spring activity.

The genus and species was described from a series of type specimens, the holotype specimen UF 8497, which is currently preserved in the paleobotanical collections of the University of Florida and thirty-seven paratype specimens. Eight of the paratypes are also in the University of Florida collections, while twenty-five are in the National Museum of Natural History collections, two are deposited at the Burke Museum of Natural History and Culture and the remaining specimen is part of the University of Michigan, Museum of Paleontology. The fossils were part of a group of approximately 20,000 specimens collected from 1942 to 1989 by Thomas Bones, Alonzo W. Hancock, R. A. Scott, Steven R. Manchester, and a number of high school students.

The Coryloides specimens were studied by paleobotanist Steven R. Manchester of the University of Florida. He published his 1994 type description for C. hancockii in the journal Palaeontographica Americana. In his type description Manchester noted the generic name is derived from similarity of the fossils to the nuts of Corylus. The specific epithet hancockii was chosen in honor of the amateur paleobotanist Alonzo W. Hancock, for his work establishing the field station next to the Clarno Nut Beds. Though originally informally identified as palm fruits, Coryloides is considered either to have been a sister genus of the hazelnuts in Corylus, or as an example of parallel evolution in the subfamily Coryloideae.

== Description ==
The nuts of Coryloides hancockii are nearly perfectly spherical and rounded at both the apex and base. The nuts have an overall length ranging between 24.8–37.5 millimetres (0.976–1.48 in) and a diameter between 23.0 to 32.6 millimetres (0.906 to 1.28 in). The nuts are unilocular in structure, containing a solitary nut. The nuts have an outer hull showing strong ribbing from base to apex and which are spaced about 2–4 millimetres (0.08–0.16 in) apart at the nut equator. The wall of the nut is 0.8–1.2 millimetres (0.03–0.05 in) thick and a large vascular bundle corresponds to each of the external ribs. The base is dominated by a circular basal scar 20–25 millimetres (0.8–1 in) in diameter and a stylar protrusion 1.5–2.5 millimetres (0.06–0.1 in) in diameter at the apex. The vascular bundles, unilocular nut and fruit, and circular detachment scar on the nut base are all features seen in the modern genus Corylus, but the larger nut size and the nearly perfectly spherical nature of the nut are not seen in Corylus.
