= David Sepkoski =

American science historian

David Sepkoski (born January 27, 1972) is an American science historian and college professor at the University of Illinois at Urbana-Champaign.

== Background and career ==
Sepkoski was born in Dorchester, Massachusetts to paleontologist Jack Sepkoski. His stepmother is the paleomammologist Christine Janis. He received his BA from Carleton College, his MA from the University of Chicago, and his doctoral degree in science history from the University of Minnesota. His publications include three books, most recently Catastrophic Thinking, which deals with mass extinction events.

=== E. O. Wilson controversy ===
Shortly after the death of E. O. Wilson, Sepkoski and Mark Borello published an article in The New York Review of Books titled Ideology as Biology, which asked: E. O. Wilson corresponded for years with a notorious proponent of race science, advocating for his research behind the scenes. What does it tell us about his most controversial work?

== Awards and honors ==
- 2018 - Thomas M. Siebel endowed Chair of History
- 2020 - Guggenheim Fellowship
