= Robin Palmer =

American political activist (1930–2010)

- Born: Richard Robert Palmer; April 7, 1930; Harlem, New York, U.S.
- Died: August 20, 2010 (aged 80); Ithaca, New York, U.S.
- Education: Cornell University
- Organizations: Weather Underground; Kiwanis
- Political party: Youth International Party
- Spouses: Arlene Corwin; Mimi Melegrito
- Partner: Sharon Krebs
- Parents: Ephraim Laurence Palmer (father); Katherine Van Winkle Palmer (mother)

Robin Palmer (born Richard Robert Palmer; April 7, 1930 – August 20, 2010) was an American political activist, television host and producer, and convicted member of the Weather Underground.

== Biography ==
Robin Palmer was born in Harlem on April 7, 1930, to palaeontologist Katherine Van Winkle Palmer and educationalist Ephraim Laurence Palmer, both of whom worked as college professors. Born to politically conservative parents, Robin's father was a supporter of anti-Communist Senator Joseph McCarthy, and their political differences caused a rift to grow between them.

Robin's older brother Laurence, also known as "Punky", contracted a Streptococcus infection at the age of 4, leaving him with severe arthritis until his early death at age 17.

Robin worked as a tree surgeon for most of his life, but also worked for 12 years as a deep sea diver for International Underwater Contractors. He worked as a high school English teacher in Harlem for 6 years, but lost his teaching license after it was discovered that he had simultaneously been moonlighting in pornography; a turn of events covered at the time by Playboy magazine. In the early 1960s he was briefly married to singer Arlene Corwin (born Arlene Nover) whom he had met through Teddy Charles, until they separated four months later.

=== Political activism ===
In October 1967 Palmer participated in the March on the Pentagon which ended in a riot outside the building. It was here that he became acquainted with Abbie Hoffman who would later lead the Youth International Party, also known as the "Yippies". Palmer was arrested on a felony charge of assaulting a U.S. marshal, and anti-war activist Dr. Benjamin Spock helped bail Palmer out of jail. An image of Palmer being beaten by police on the steps outside the Pentagon was featured on the front page of the Washington Post.

Palmer would also be involved in the 1968 Columbia University protests, where he participated in the takeover of administrative buildings by the Students for a Democratic Society (SDS), and where he began to form a close relationship with Sam Melville. Palmer was arrested during the 1968 Democratic National Convention protests after throwing a chunk of concrete through a car window. A year later Palmer was named as an unindicted co-conspirator in the trial of the Chicago Seven in which Abbie Hoffman was a defendant. He was similarly named as an unindicted co-conspirator in the Melville collective.

In November 1968, Palmer and his then-girlfriend Sharon Krebs disrupted a Humphrey-Muskie campaign rally by stripping nude and holding up a severed pig's head; a signature move of the radical group known as "the Crazies", whose members were often associated with the Youth International Party.

During the Vietnam War, Palmer was a member of Veterans and Reservists Against The War. He had trained as a paratrooper in the early 1950s, but when called to serve in the Korean War he became one of a handful of conscientious objectors.

==== Arson trial and imprisonment ====
In the summer of 1970 Palmer joined the Weather Underground. Palmer was the leading member of a group of Weathermen who planned - and attempted to carry out - a series of firebombing attacks on various locations in New York City, beginning on the one-year anniversary of the assassination of Fred Hampton by police in Chicago. On December 4, 1970, Palmer and five others (Sharon Krebs, Joyce Plecha, Claudia Conine, Martin Lewis and Christopher Trenkle) were arrested while attempting to firebomb their first target: the First National City Bank at Madison Avenue and 91st Street. New York Police had been made aware of the planned attacks ahead of time by police informant Steve Wiener, and the group were caught at the scene with four 1-gallon containers of gasoline and benzene. Other planned targets included 20 Broad Street, which housed the law firm Mudge Rose Guthrie & Alexander (of which Richard Nixon was previously a partner); East Fifth Street police station; a new police station under construction off West Tenth Street; the Bolivian Consulate; and the mathematics and science building at New York University.

On December 9, the conspirators were charged with attempted arson in the first degree, attempted criminal mischief, conspiracy to commit arson, conspiracy to commit criminal mischief, and possession of dangerous instruments. The other five conspirators had their bail set at $50,000 each, but Palmer was also separately charged with being a recruiter for the Weather Underground, and his bail was set at $250,000. On March 8, 1971 - the day before their trial was due to start - all of the defendants pleaded guilty to second-degree conspiracy.

Palmer began his prison sentence at Attica Correctional Facility shortly before the 1971 Attica Uprising, during which Sam Melville was killed, Palmer claiming that he had died in his arms. Palmer served three years at Attica.

=== Later life ===
Over time Palmer's political alignment shifted to the right, alienating himself from left-wing political activists after criticizing Fidel Castro and the Cuban government. He was also critical of the Palestine Liberation Organization (PLO) and was a staunch supporter of Israel. He expressed regret for his involvement in the attempted arson attack, and described his involvement with the Weather Underground as a "disillusioning journey". While he continued to believe that the United States was in the wrong during the Vietnam War, he would later express support for President George W Bush and the 2003 invasion of Iraq, and in a 2009 incident he threw his shoes at the mayor of Ithaca after the city voted to condemn the wars in Iraq and Afghanistan.

On August 28, 2000, an $8 million settlement was awarded to survivors of the Attica Prison uprising, of which Palmer received $7,500 which he then donated to Sam Melville's son Joshua.

Palmer worked as a local cable TV host and producer for 20 years, and was a Kiwanian during this time. He was also a member of the Tompkins County Veteran's Committee and the Ithaca Gay Men's Chorus (now known as the Ithaca Queer Singers Alliance).

Robin Palmer lived with cancer for 20 years before he died on August 20, 2010, at the age of 80. He was survived by his wife of 21 years, Mimi Melegrito, and his children Christopher, Tina and Cindy. His wife Mimi was born in Luzon in the Philippines and moved to the United States in 1965 at the age of 17. She served as the first female President of the Ithaca Kiwanis, and as Charter President of Cayuga Kiwanis.
