= Gilbert Dennison Harris =

American paleontologist (1864–1952)

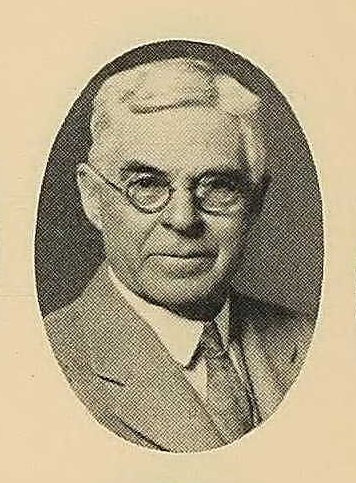
Gilbert Dennison Harris, circa 1929

Gilbert Dennison Harris (October 2, 1864 – December 4, 1952) was an American geologist and paleontologist. He was a professor of paleontology and stratigraphic geology at Cornell University and proprietor and editor of two scientific journals, Bulletins of American Paleontology and Palaeontographica Americana. Harris later left Cornell and founded the Paleontological Research Institution, an independent organization dedicated to research and education in the field of paleontology.

== Biography ==
=== Early life ===
Harris was born on October 2, 1864, near Jamestown, New York. Harris entered Cornell University in 1883 and graduated with a Bachelor of Philosophy degree in 1886. Post-graduation, he worked for state geological surveys in Texas and Arkansas and the U.S. Geological Survey in Washington, D.C., and in 1894, traveled to Europe to study Tertiary deposits of southern England and northern France.

=== Career ===
Later the same year, Gilbert Harris was appointed Assistant Professor of Paleontology and Stratigraphy at Cornell University, receiving full professorship fifteen years later, in 1909. Over nearly forty years at the university, he established himself as a premier invertebrate paleontologist, specializing in Cenozoic mollusks of the U.S. Gulf and Atlantic coastal plains. Through his research along the coastal plains, Caribbean, and Latin America, Harris made extensive contributions to Cornell's fossil collections. He also studied the K-T Boundary extensively, and, as State Geologist of Louisiana between 1899 and 1909, Harris's contributions to petroleum geology in the Gulf coast, especially his work on salt domes and their relation to petroleum reservoirs, helped the area become a target for oil exploration and drilling.

In 1895, Harris established a printing enterprise at McGraw Hall and founded the scientific journal Bulletins of American Paleontology, which remains the oldest continuously published paleontological journal in the Western Hemisphere. In 1916, he founded a second publication, Palaeontographica Americana, which was printed in a larger format to allow for more-detailed images.

=== Paleontological Research Institution ===
In 1932, frustrated by the university administration's lack of respect for his accomplishments and rejection of his demand for a fire-proof building to house his collections, library, and printing enterprise, Gilbert Harris looked to creating an independent institution, separate from Cornell, that would serve as a haven for himself and others who shared his interest in paleontology. This institution, dubbed the Paleontological Research Institution, was chartered as a membership organization in New York State. Harris constructed a simple two-story building on a plot of land adjacent to his home near Cornell's North Campus that served as headquarters for the institution. His printing enterprise and journals were relocated to PRI following the split from Cornell, and Harris continued to print them himself on his rotary press until two years before his death.

=== Death ===
Harris died on December 4, 1952, as a result of a long illness that had rendered him bedridden for over nine months.
