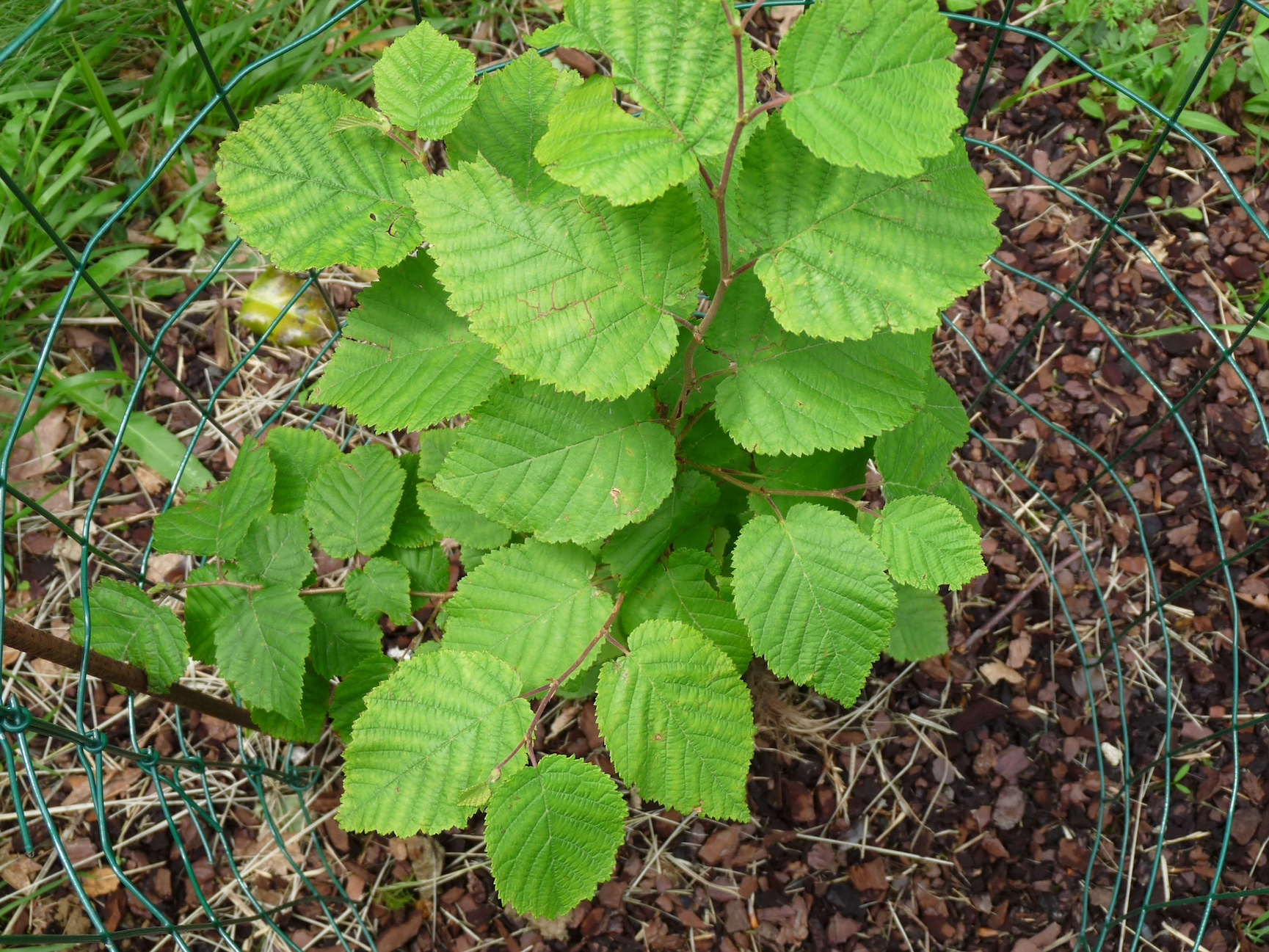
- Ostryopsis davidiana

Scientific classification
- Kingdom: Plantae
- Clade: Tracheophytes
- Clade: Angiosperms
- Clade: Eudicots
- Clade: Rosids
- Order: Fagales
- Family: Betulaceae
- Subfamily: Coryloideae
- Genus: Ostryopsis; Decne.

= Ostryopsis =

Genus of shrubs

Ostryopsis is a small genus of deciduous shrubs belonging to the birch family Betulaceae. The species have no common English name, though hazel-hornbeam has been suggested, reflecting their similarities to the closely related hazels and hop-hornbeams.

The genus is native to China. They are shrubs reaching 3–5 m tall, with alternate, double-toothed hazel-like leaves 2–7 cm long. The flowers are produced in spring, with separate male and female catkins. The fruit form in clusters 3–5 cm long with 6-10 seeds; each seed is a small nut 4–6 mm long, fully enclosed in a sheath-like involucre.

The local people in Northeast China has found hazelnuts of Ostryopsis davidiana and Corylus mandshurica are more delicious than that of common hazels and Asian hazels, and the cuisine "stir-fried huozhenzi" (火榛子) are popular. However, their hazelnuts are far more expensive than common and Asian hazelnuts.

Species

- Ostryopsis davidiana Decne. - widespread from Sichuan to Liaoning
- Ostryopsis intermedia B.Tian & J.Q.Liu - Yunnan
- Ostryopsis nobilis Balf.f. & W.W.Sm. - Sichuan, Yunnan
