= Bulletins of American Paleontology =

- Discipline: Paleontology
- Language: English
- Edited by: Jonathan R. Hendricks

Publication details
- History: 1895–present
- Publisher: Paleontological Research Institution (United States)
- Frequency: Biannually

Standard abbreviations
- ISO 4: Bull. Am. Paleontol.

Indexing
- CODEN: BAPLAJ
- ISSN: 0007-5779
- OCLC no.: 1537796

Links
- Journal homepage

Bulletins of American Paleontology is a peer-reviewed scientific journal published by the Paleontological Research Institution and issued biannually that features monographs and dissertations in the field of paleontology and other related subjects. Founded by Gilbert Harris in 1895, it is the oldest continuously-published paleontological periodical in the Western Hemisphere, and one of the oldest in the world.

== History ==
In 1895, Gilbert Harris, a professor of geology at Cornell University, established Bulletins of American Paleontology in order to publish his research on Paleocene and Eocene mollusk fossils. Printing originally took place at Harris's own printing enterprise at McGraw Hall, Cornell. Publication of Bulletins was transferred to the Paleontological Research Institution upon its founding by Gilbert Harris in 1932.

In 1961, PRI signed an agreement with Kraus Reprints (now Periodicals Service Company) to reprint out-of-print issues of Bulletins.

Since 1986, Bulletins has featured the series "Neogene Paleontology of the Northern Dominican Republic", a large-scale project to identify and collect fossils from the Neogene Caribbean sequence. 20 systemic monographs in the series have been published in Bulletins of American Paleontology.

== Abstracting and indexing ==
The journal is abstracted and indexed in:

- Biological Abstracts
- BIOSIS Previews
- GEOBASE
- GeoRef
- Petroleum Abstracts
- Scopus
- Speleological Abstracts
- The Zoological Record
