= Paleontological Research Institution =

U.S. non-profit organization

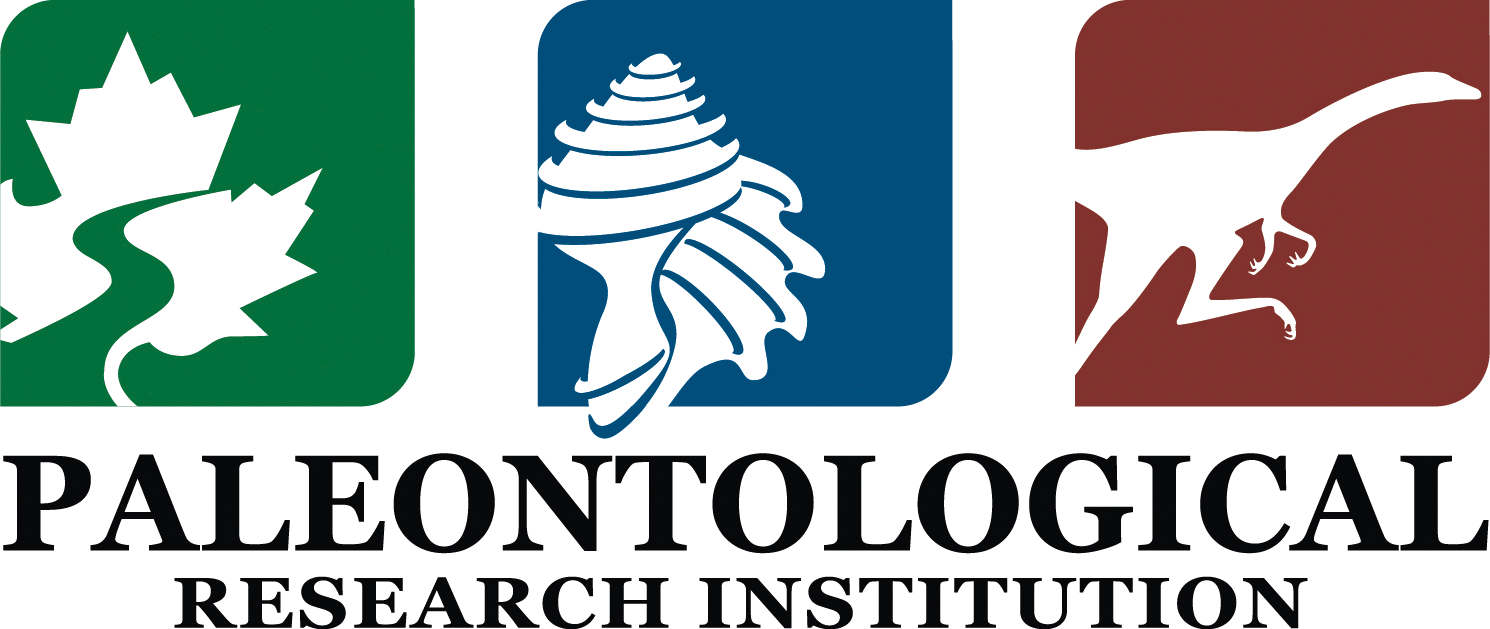
- Founder: Gilbert Harris
- Established: 1932
- Mission: The Paleontological Research Institution pursues and integrates education and research, and interprets the history and systems of the Earth and its life to increase knowledge, educate society, and encourage wise stewardship of the Earth.
- Focus: Paleontological research, Earth science education
- Director: Dr. Warren Allmon
- Address: 1259 Trumansburg Rd.
- Location: Ithaca, New York, United States
- Website: www.priweb.org

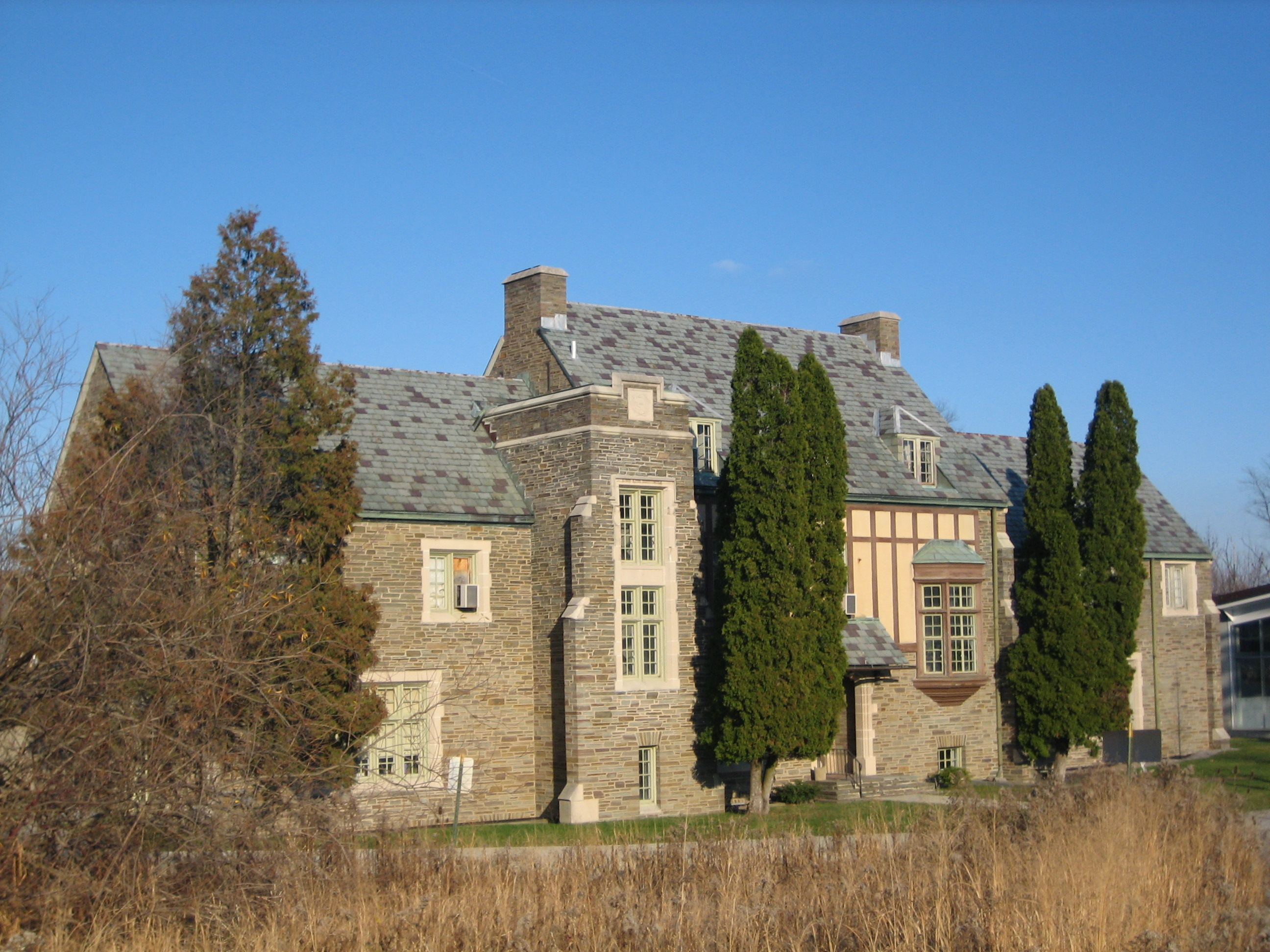
Palmer Hall, the Paleontological Research Institution's present facility

Gilbert Harris, 1864–1952

The Paleontological Research Institution, or PRI, is a paleontological organization in Ithaca, New York, with a mission including both research and education. PRI is affiliated with Cornell University, houses one of the largest fossil collections in North America, and publishes, among other things, the oldest journal of paleontology in the western hemisphere, Bulletins of American Paleontology.

PRI's facilities include the Museum of the Earth, a natural history museum that houses some of PRI's collections for public viewing and educates visitors on the history of life on Earth, and, since 2013, the Cayuga Nature Center, an educational venue with a focus on outdoor and environmental education.

== History ==
PRI was founded in 1932 by Gilbert Harris, a professor of geology at Cornell University from 1894 to 1934. Frustrated by the university's lack of assurance for the safety and perpetuation of his fossil collections and printing enterprise, Bulletins of American Paleontology, Harris established PRI as a separate organization, unaffiliated with Cornell, to house his collection of fossils and continue to publish research. Beginning as a small building behind Harris' home in Ithaca, New York, the institution served as a haven for Harris and others who wished to pursue research in paleontology. PRI was granted a provisional charter by the New York State Board of Regents in 1933, and an absolute charter in 1936. Through various additions over the next two decades, the original building grew into a 20-room complex that housed the Institution's collections, library, laboratories, and offices. In 1968, under the then director Katherine Palmer, PRI relocated to its present facility on West Hill, along Trumansburg Road (N.Y. Rte. 96), which currently holds a collection of over 3 million specimens and a 50,000 volume research library.

In 2003, PRI opened the Museum of the Earth, an 18,000-square-foot (1,700 m^{2}) facility that showcases PRI's collections on a journey through 4.5 billion years of history. Attracting approximately 30,000 visitors a year, the museum's displays include fossils, glaciers, coral reef aquaria, and the skeletons of a right whale and American mastodon.

In 2004, PRI and Cornell University signed an agreement of formal affiliation. PRI remains an independent organization with recognized connections to the university.

In 2013, the Cayuga Nature Center became part of PRI with the goal of educating the public about the impact of climate change on the fauna and flora of Tompkins County

== Education ==
PRI's facilities at the Museum of the Earth and the Cayuga Nature Center provide opportunities for exploration-based, hands-on learning about the natural world and scientific process. PRI offers programs and opportunities for both students and teachers at the regional, state, and national levels to learn about a wide variety of topics, including ecology, evolution, Earth science, energy, and climate change. The Education Department offers programs in six major areas: Interactive Programs and Events, Teacher Development, Global Change Education, Evolution Education, Earth Research Partnerships, and National Education Networks.

The institution is also involved with several organizations that promote scientific education and literacy, including Next Generation Science Standards (NGSS), the Climate Literacy and Energy Awareness Network (CLEAN), and the Western New York STEM Hub (WNY STEM).

Two major online, open educational resources being developed by PRI include the Digital Atlas of Ancient Life (focused on paleontology) and Earth@Home (focused on geology and other Earth sciences).

== Collections ==
With over seven million specimens, PRI houses one of the ten largest collections of fossils and Recent shells in the United States. Among them are over 16,000 type and figured specimens, also one of the ten largest such collections in the nation. The bulk of the collections consists of invertebrates, with strong points in western hemisphere Cenozoic mollusks, Paleozoic marine invertebrates of New York State, and Cenozoic Benthic foraminifera of the Gulf Coastal Plain and Caribbean. PRI also houses notable collections of Recent mollusks, Triassic-Jurassic vertebrates of the Newark series, Pleistocene vertebrates (particularly mastodons) of New York State, and fossil plants and fish. Many of PRI's specimens are especially valuable because they are from localities now destroyed or no longer available for study.

In 1995, Cornell University's nonbotanical fossil and Recent mollusk collections were transferred to PRI on long-term loan.

== Research ==
Research has been one of the core functions of the institution since its founding in 1932. Much of the current research done at PRI focuses on fossils and Recent mollusks of the Western hemisphere, in addition to Devonian marine invertebrates and Pleistocene mastodons of New York State. Ongoing projects at PRI include Bivalve Assembling the Tree of Life (BivAToL), a venture to reconstruct the evolutionary origins of bivalve mollusks; the Conservation Paleobiology Workshop; the Mastodon Matrix Project, an effort to sift through the matrix recovered from around the Hyde Park Mastodon; and the Minute 319 Project, which uses samples of baseline benthic Mollusk communities to evaluate the impact of engineered pulse flows in the Colorado River.

PRI offers five research labs for both affiliated and visiting staff and students: the BioLab, a clean lab for microscope work; the PaleoLab, a dirty lab for rough processing of field collections, the WetLab for maintaining and studying living aquatic specimens, the PrepLab, a space for fine specimen preparation that also functions as a public exhibition at the Museum of the Earth, and the Amino Acid Racemization (AAR) geochronology lab, which provides equipment for amino acid dating. The AAR Lab at PRI is one of only three in the U.S. and six worldwide, and the only one to use an Agilent 6890 gas chromatography (GC). Apart from the labs, PRI's research facilities also include the specimen collections and the William P.S. and Jeannine Ventress Library, a collection of approximately 60,000 books and serials.

PRI also presents four awards annually to recognize excellence in the field of paleontology: the Katherine Palmer Award, the Gilbert Harris Award, the J. Thomas Dutro Jr. Student Award, and the John W. Wells Grants-in-Aid of Research.

== Publications ==
The Paleontological Research Institution

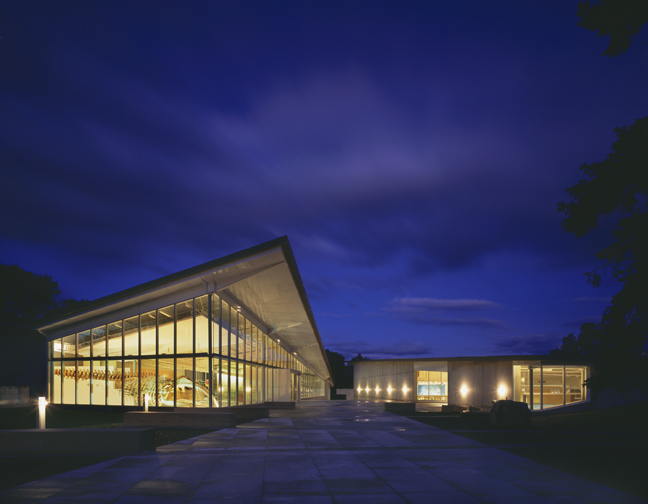
The Museum of the Earth by night

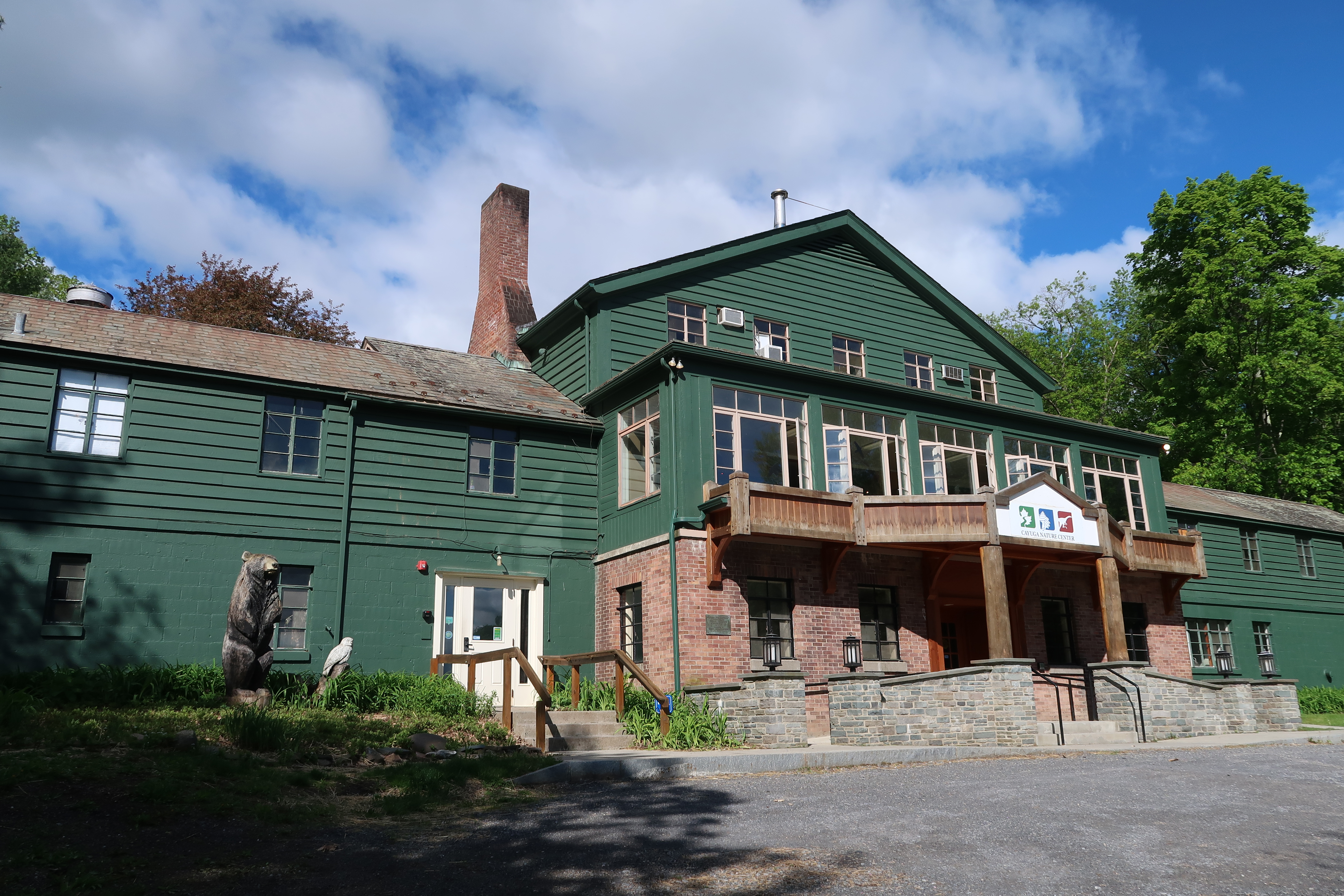
Cayuga Nature Center

=== Bulletins of American Paleontology ===
Founded by Gilbert Harris in 1895, Bulletins of American Paleontology is the oldest continuously published paleontological journal in the Western Hemisphere. Originally based at Cornell, the publication of Bulletins was taken over by PRI upon the institution's founding. It is issued biannually and is notable for its coverage of lengthier papers and dissertations that would otherwise be more difficult to publish.

=== Palaeontographica Americana ===
Established in 1916, the academic journal Palaeontographica Americana was originally published in a larger format than Bulletins of American Paleontology to allow for larger, more high-quality images. Publication of Palaeontographica Americana was officially discontinued in 2013.

=== American Paleontologist ===
Originating as a newsletter for members of PRI and the Museum of the Earth, American Paleontologist was a quarterly magazine designed to be accessible for everyone interested in fossils and the history of life. American Paleontologist was published in themed issues and featured articles by experts in paleontology and related fields, regular columns, book reviews, scientific and PRI-specific news, a museum calendar of events, and an insert geared towards children titled "Fossil Stuff". Publication of American Paleontologist was halted in 2012, following the release of volume 19.

=== The Teacher-Friendly Guide series ===
The Teacher-Friendly Guide series published by PRI provides information for grades 6–9 teachers and includes guides for climate change, geology, and evolution in bivalves and maize. Teacher-Friendly Guides to Earth Sciences cover six US regions (the Northeast, Southeast, Midwest, West, South Central, Northwest Central, and Southwest), each with their own book.

- The Teacher-Friendly Guide to Geology of the Northeastern US (2003)
- The Teacher-Friendly Guide to Evolution Using Bivalves as a Model Organism (2011)
- The Teacher-Friendly Guide to the Earth Science of the Midwestern US (2014)
- The Teacher-Friendly Guide to the Earth Science of the Western US (2014)
- The Teacher-Friendly Guide to the Earth Science of the South Central US (2015)
- The Teacher-Friendly Guide to the Earth Science of the Northwest Central US (2015)
- The Teacher-Friendly Guide to the Earth Science of the Southeastern US (2016)
- The Teacher-Friendly Guide to the Earth Science of the Southwestern US (2016)
- The Teacher-Friendly Guide to Climate Change (2017)

=== The Very Short Guide series ===
- Evolution & Creationism: A Very Short Guide, 2nd ed. (2009)
- Climate Change - Past, Present, and Future: a Very Short Guide (2010)
- The Science Beneath the Surface: A Very Short Guide to the Marcellus Shale (2013)

=== Darwin@Cornell ===
- Darwin@Cornell 2006: a Community Discusses Evolution, Creationism, and Intelligent Design (2007)
- Darwin@Cornell 2007: a Community Discusses Evolution and Human Nature (2007)
- Darwin@Cornell 2008: a Community Discusses Evolution and The Environment (2008)

=== Other ===
- Fossil Shells of the Tertiary Formations of North America (1832-1837). (1963)
- Neogene Mollusks from Northwestern Ecuador (1964)
- Catalogue of the Reigen Collection of Mazatlan Mollusca in the British Museum (1967)
- Recent Molluscs of the Gulf of Mexico and Pleistocene and Pliocene Species from the Gulf States (1971)
- Pleiocene Fossils of South Carolina, Containing Descriptions and Figures of the Polyparia, Echinodermata and Mollusca (1974)
- Timothy Abbott Conrad, with Particular Reference to his Work in Alabama One Hundred Years Ago (1977)
- Memoires sur les Fossiles des Environs de Paris (1978)
- Genera of the Bivalvia: a Systematic and Bibliographic Catalogue (revised and updated) (1980)
- Papers on Neogene Mollusks (1993)
- The G. D. Harris 1890 Manuscript on the Stratigraphy of Miocene and Pliocene Beds at Yorktown, Virginia (1993)
- Devonian Paleontology of New York (1994)
- Lasting Impressions: A Guide to Understanding Fossils in the Northeastern United States (1999)
- New York State Natural History Survey 1836-1842 (2000)
- Geology of Seneca County, New York (2004)
- A Leviathan of Our Own: the Tragic and Amazing Story of North Atlantic Right Whale #2030 (2004)
- The First 75 Years: a history of the Paleontological Research Institution (2007)
- Ithaca is Gorges: A Guide to the Geology of the Ithaca Area, 4th ed. (2007)
- Dinosaurs in Pop Culture (2007)
- Charles Darwin: After the Origin (2009)
- Field Guide to the Cayuga Lake Region: Its Flora, Fauna, Geology, and History (2009)
- Cecil's Colossal Journey Through Time! Coloring & Activity Book (2010)
- Field Guide to the Devonian Fossils of New York (2014)
- A Paleontological Life: The Personal Memoirs of Curt Teichert (2014)
- Smith Woods: The Environmental History of an Old Growth Forest Remnant in Central New York State (2017)
