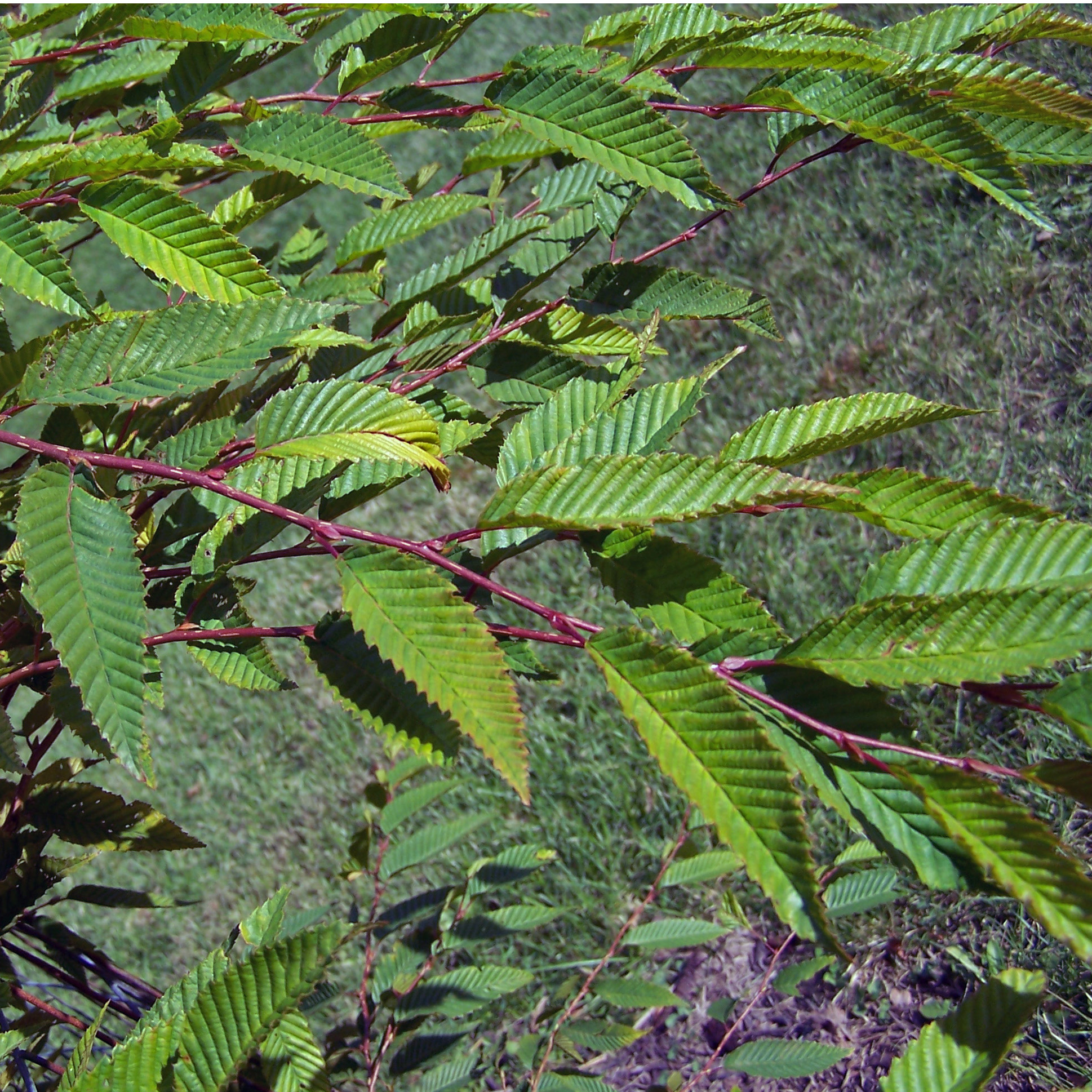
- Carpinus japonica

Conservation status
- Data Deficient (IUCN 3.1)

Scientific classification
- Kingdom: Plantae
- Clade: Embryophytes
- Clade: Tracheophytes
- Clade: Angiosperms
- Clade: Eudicots
- Clade: Rosids
- Order: Fagales
- Family: Betulaceae
- Genus: Carpinus
- Species: C. japonica

Binomial name
- Carpinus japonica Blume

Synonyms
- Carpinus carpinoides Makino; Carpinus carpinus (Siebold & Zucc.) Sarg.; Carpinus distegocarpus Koidz.; Distegocarpus carpinoides Siebold & Zucc.; Distegocarpus carpinus Siebold & Zucc.

= Carpinus japonica =

Japanese hornbeam

Species of flowering plant

Carpinus japonica, the Japanese hornbeam, is a hornbeam endemic to Japan but cultivated elsewhere as an ornamental.

It is a deciduous tree growing to 12–15 metres (39–49 ft) tall with leaves that are longer and darker than the European hornbeam (Carpinus betulus). The leaves are dark, glossy and slender, with 20-24 pairs of parallel sunken veins; every third tooth is whisker-tipped. The prominent catkins are green turning to brown.

This tree has gained the Royal Horticultural Society's Award of Garden Merit.
