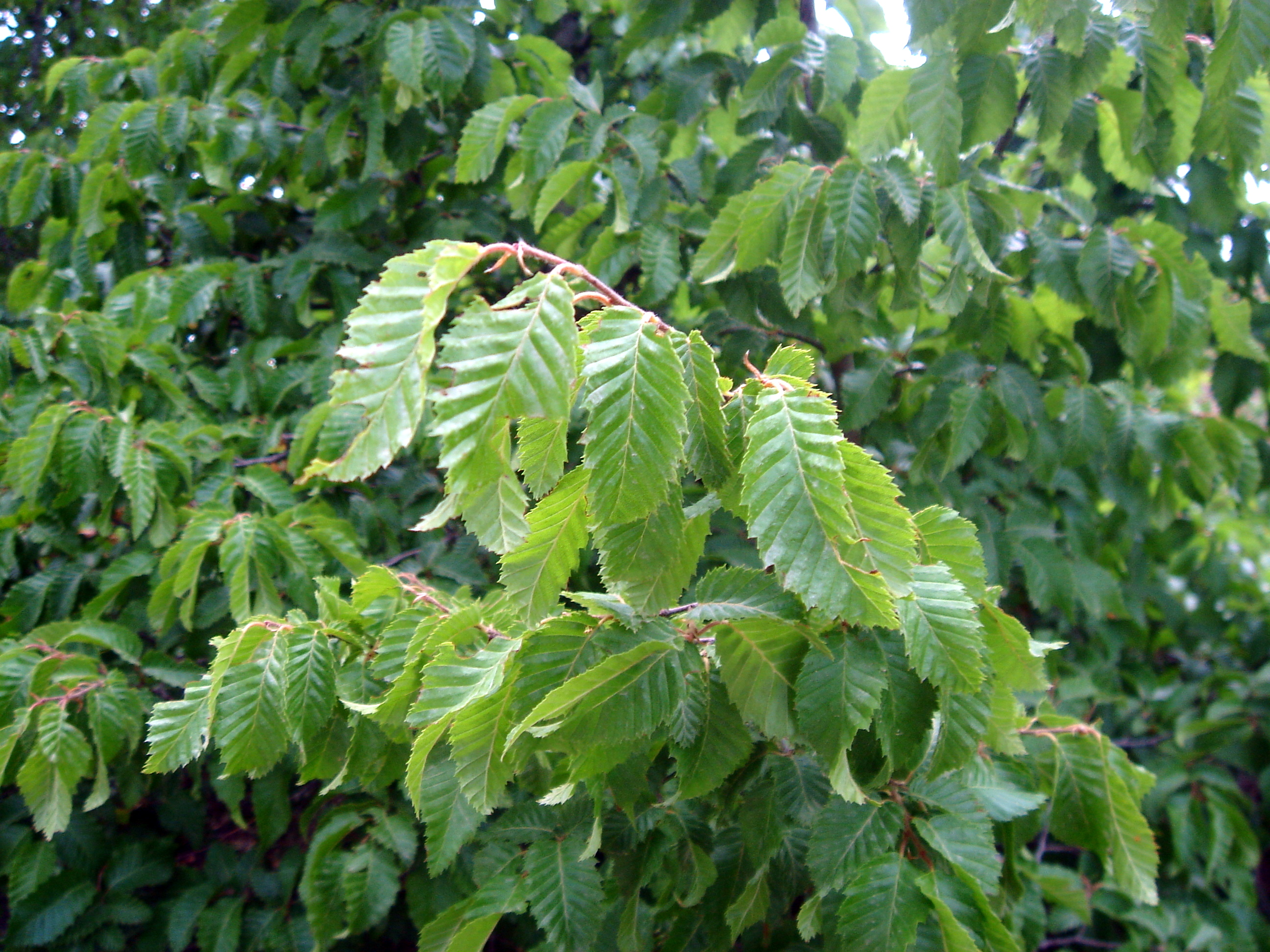

Conservation status
- Least Concern (IUCN 3.1)

Scientific classification
- Kingdom: Plantae
- Clade: Embryophytes
- Clade: Tracheophytes
- Clade: Angiosperms
- Clade: Eudicots
- Clade: Rosids
- Order: Fagales
- Family: Betulaceae
- Genus: Carpinus
- Species: C. orientalis

Binomial name
- Carpinus orientalis Mill.
- Distribution map

= Carpinus orientalis =

Species of tree

Carpinus orientalis, known as the Oriental hornbeam, is a species of hornbeam in the birch family Betulaceae, subfamily Coryloideae, native to southeastern Europe and Western Asia. It is quite tolerant of dry conditions, and usually occurs on hot dry sites at lower elevations in comparison to Carpinus betulus (European hornbeam). Together with C. betulus and Carpinus austrobalcanica, it is one of the three hornbeams native to Europe.

== Taxonomy ==
Current view recognises two subspecies: C. orientalis subsp. orientalis, the nominate form, occurs across Europe, Anatolia and the Caucasus. In Iran, to the south of the Caspian Sea, is replaced by C. orientalis subsp. macrocarpa, which is distinguished from the nominate form by larger leaves, fruits and pollen, and is sometimes treated as a distinct species, Carpinus macrocarpa. Even though Oriental hornbeam is not particularly closely related to common hornbeam—both being grouped in different subsections of section Carpinus—and have different ploidy levels, they do appear to hybridise in the Caucasus, resulting in the hybrid species Carpinus × schuschaensis.

== Description ==
Oriental hornbeam is usually a small tree, rarely over 10 m tall and often shrubby. It may, however, also grow to become a substantial tree of up to 20 m height. In comparison to common hornbeam, it is characterised by a generally smaller stature and smaller leaves, which are only 3–5 cm in length. The seeds have a simple bract, not trilobed like Carpinus betulus, that is about 2 cm long.

== Distribution ==
Oriental hornbeam assumes an extensive but patchy distribution in the central and eastern Mediterranean, Anatolia, the Caucasus and Hyrcania in Iran. Generally, its distribution matches the southeastern part of that of common hornbeam, but Oriental hornbeam penetrates deeper into southern Italy and Greece. In Europe, the species is broadly distributed in the southern half of Italy, on the Adriatic coast and in the Balkans, chiefly south of the Danube. In Asia, its distribution becomes patchier in coastal Anatolia, but it also occurs across the Caucasus and the Hyrcanian forest regions.

== Gallery ==
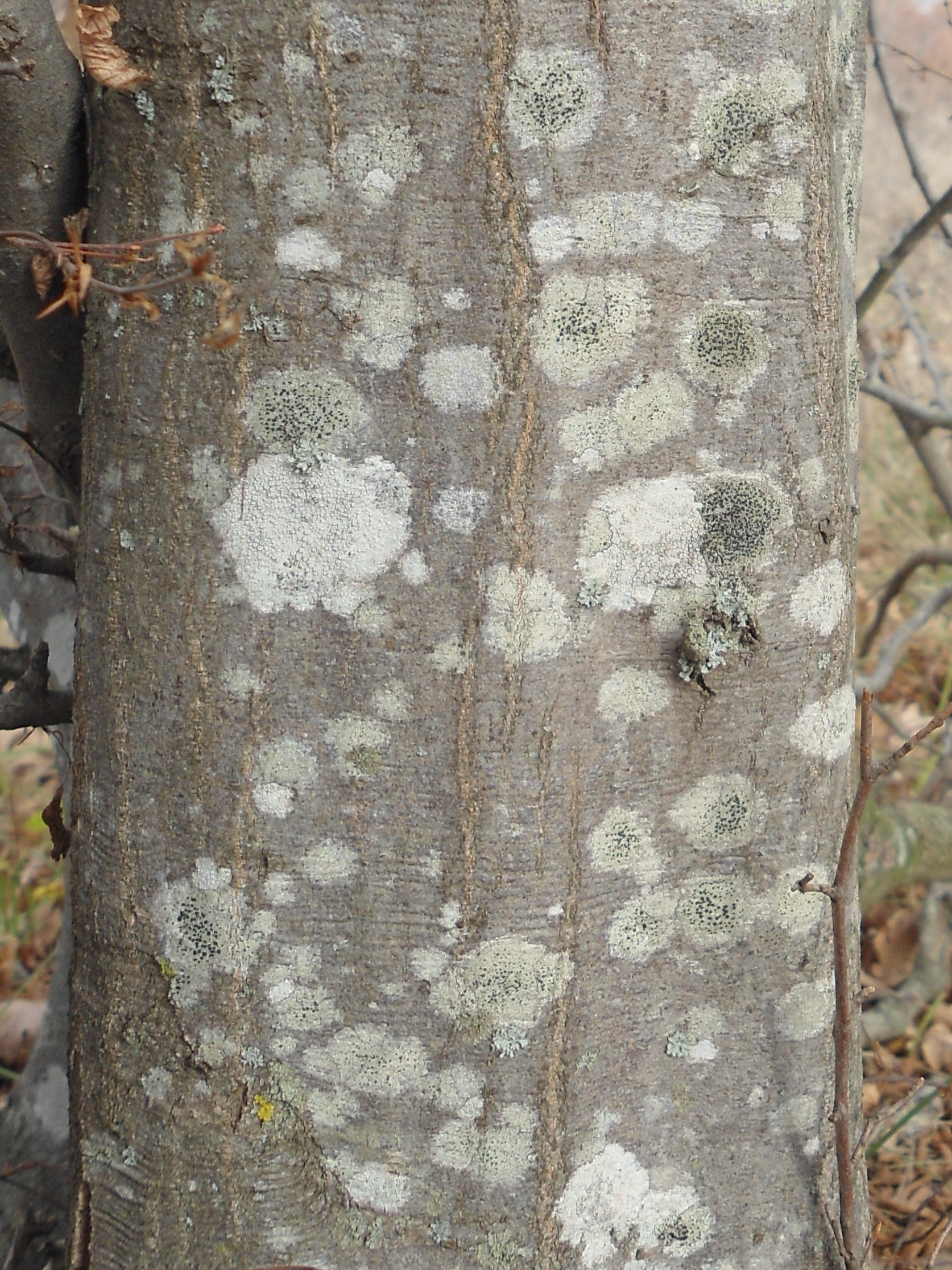
Bark

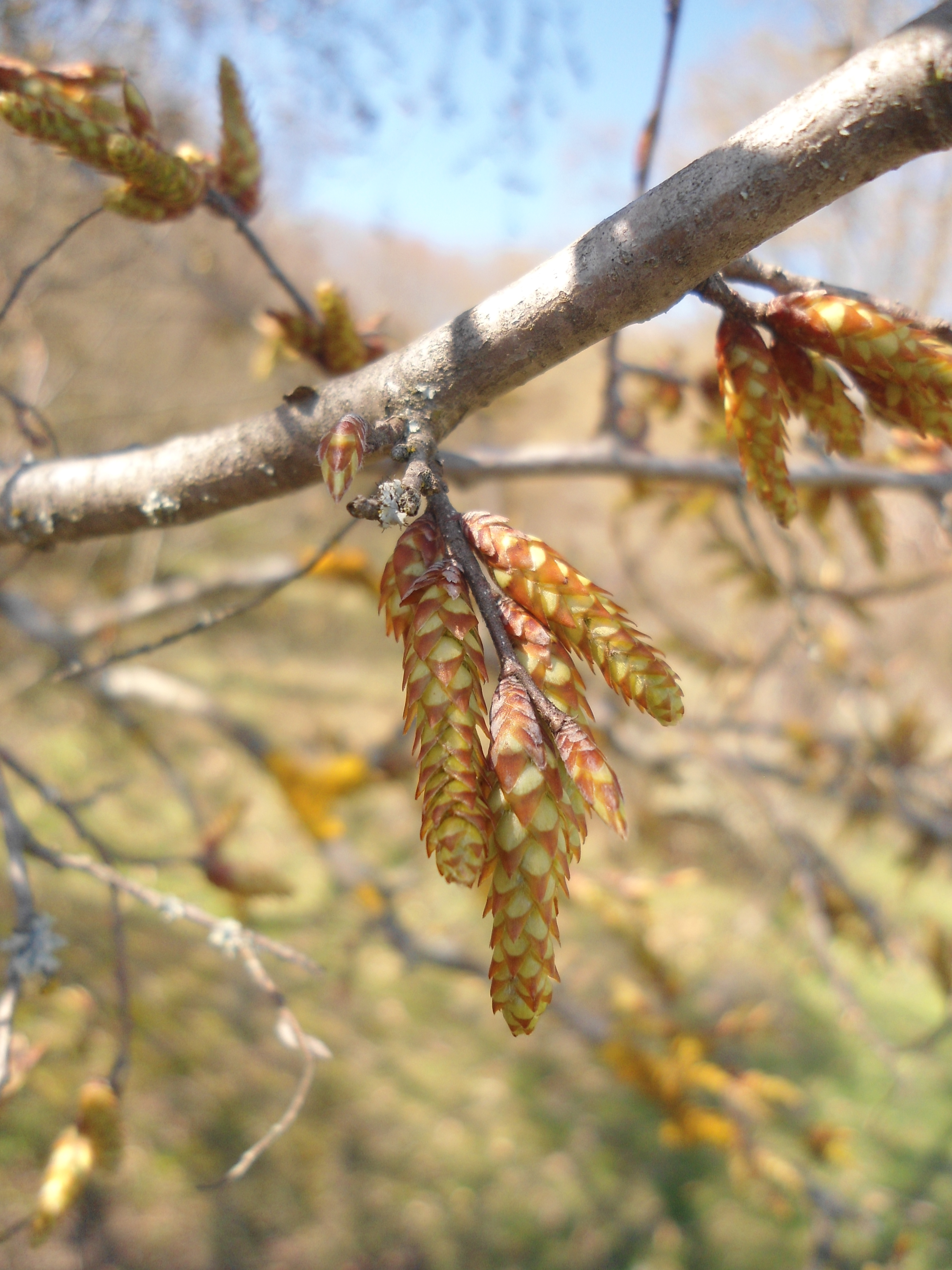
Male flowers

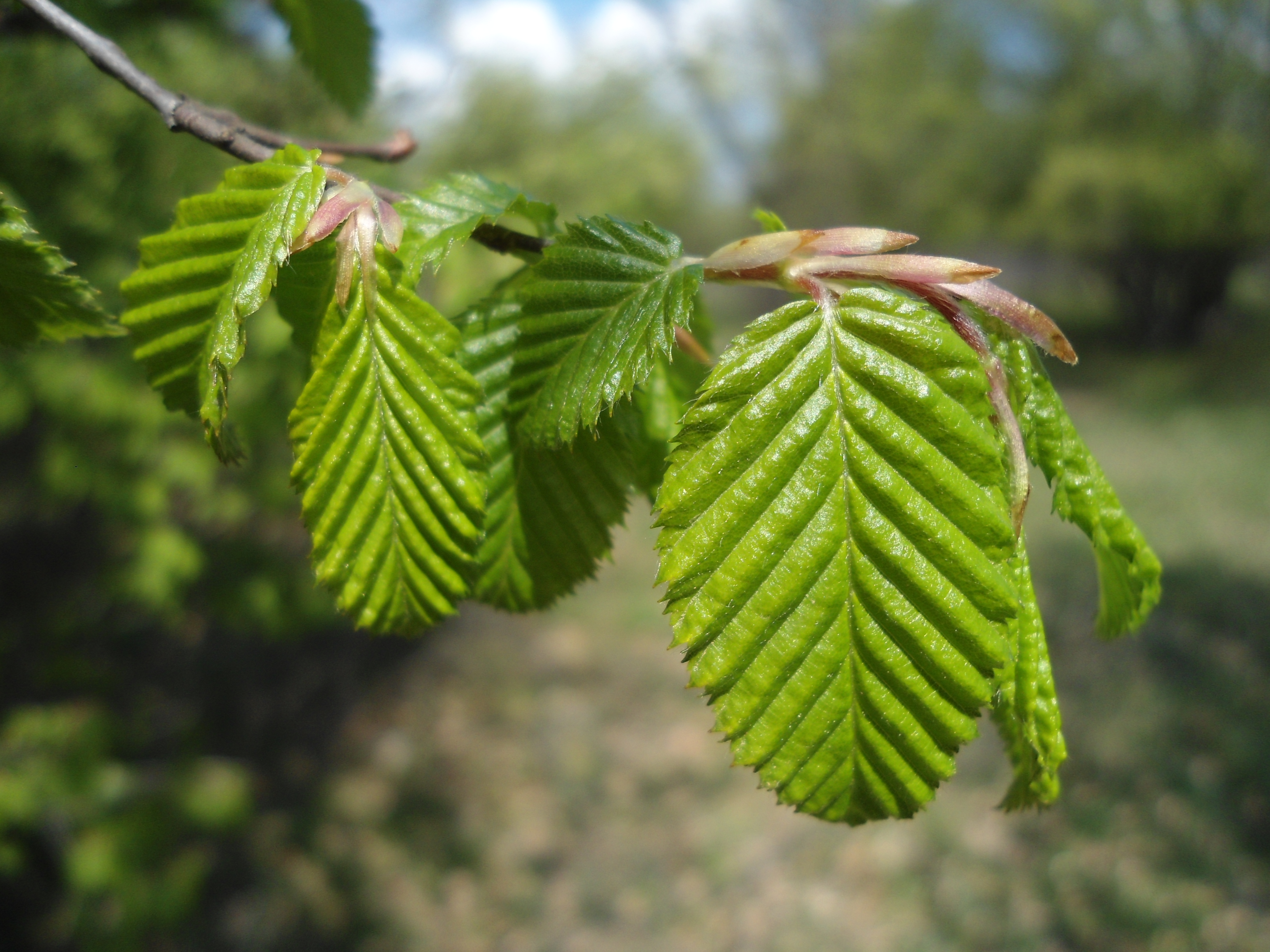
New leaves

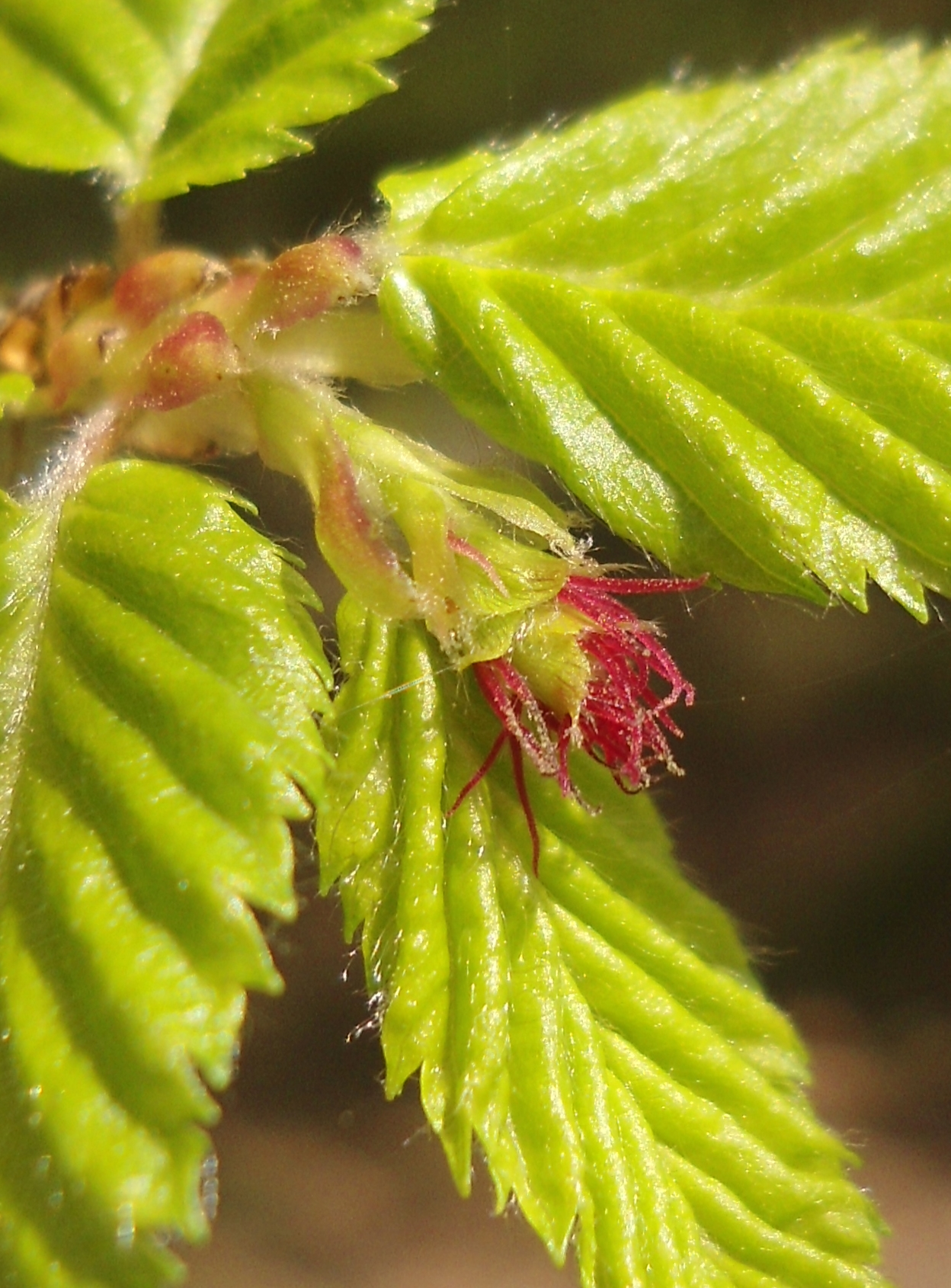
Female flower

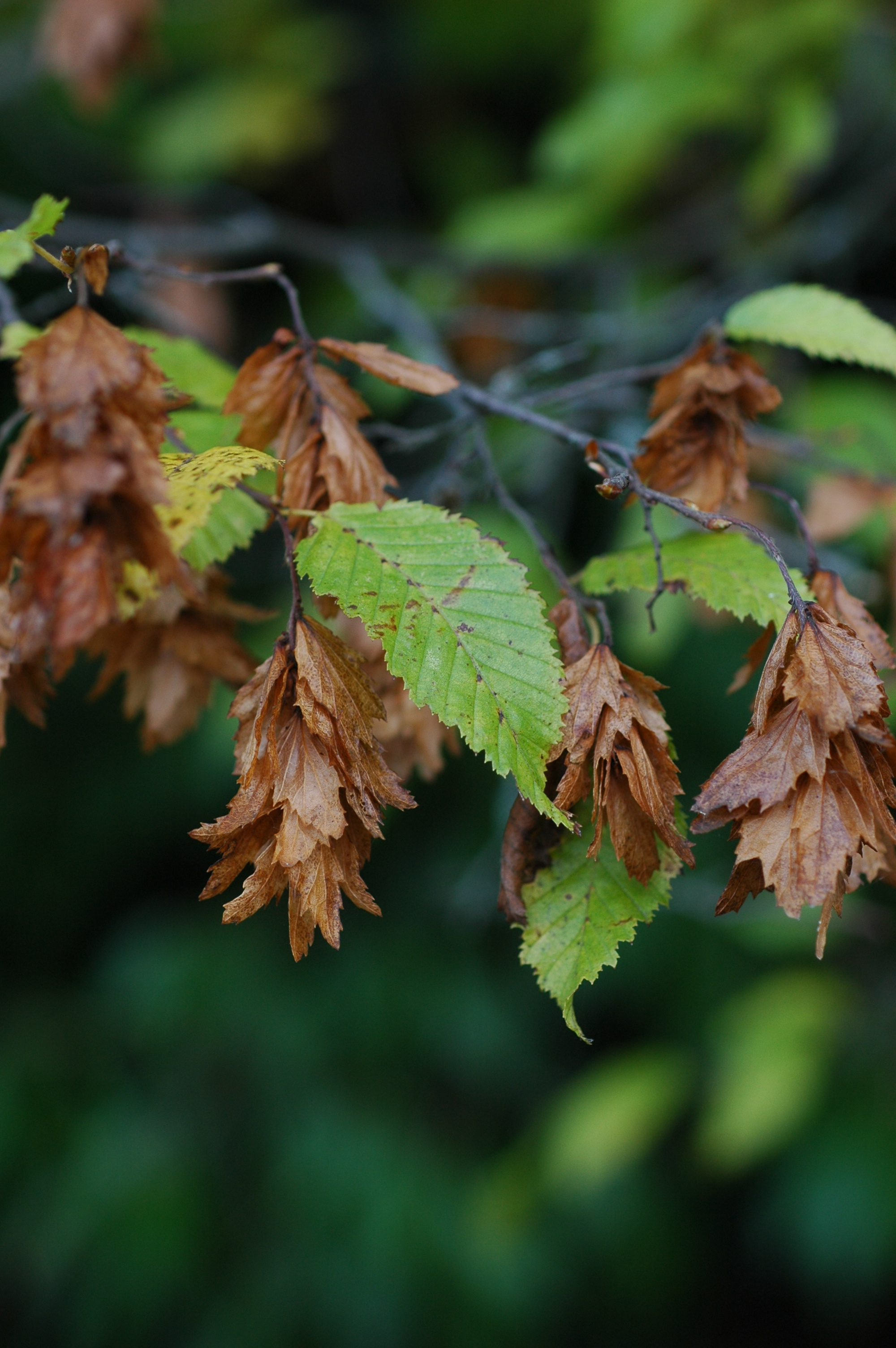
Ripe fruit

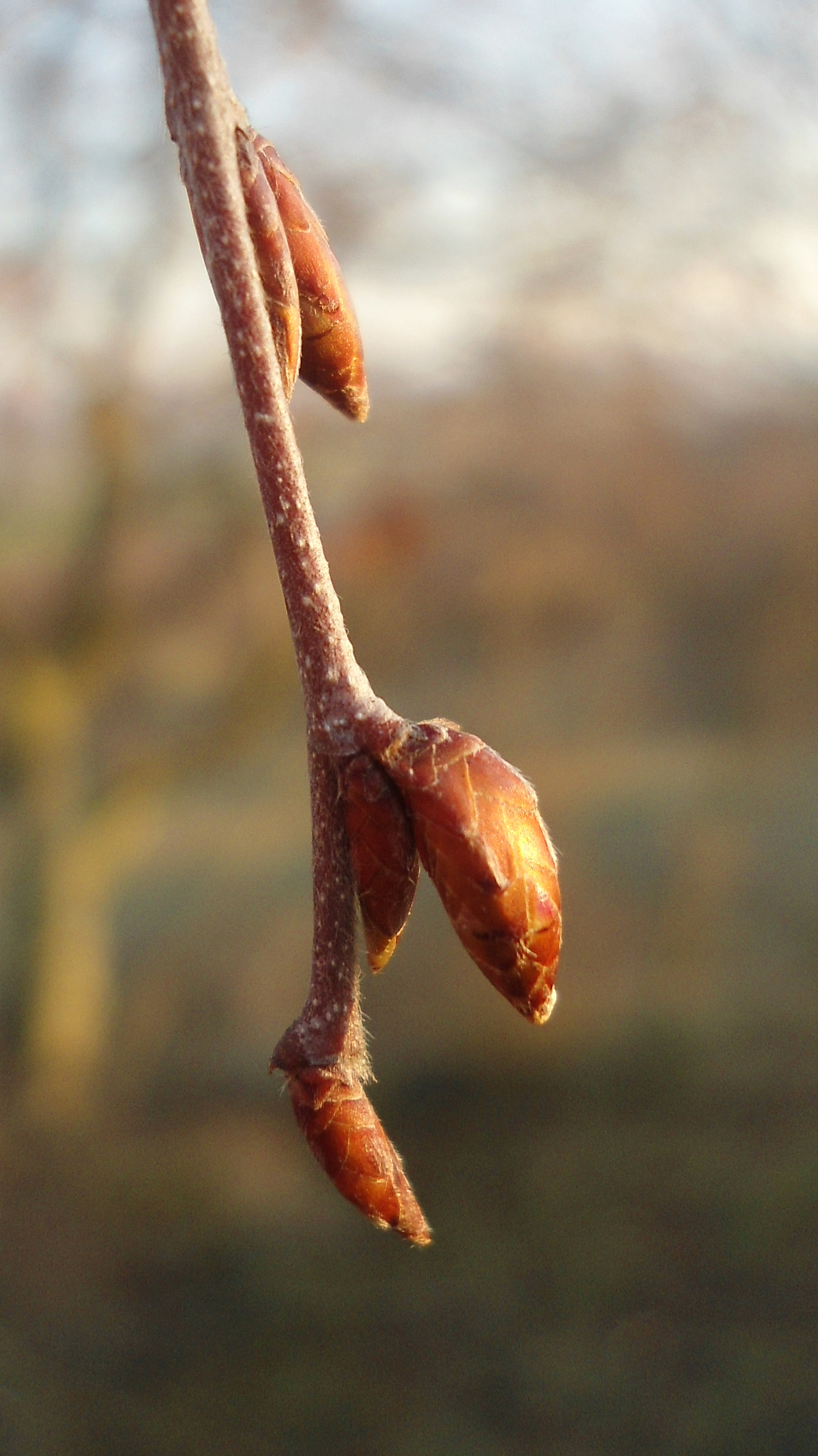
Leaf bud

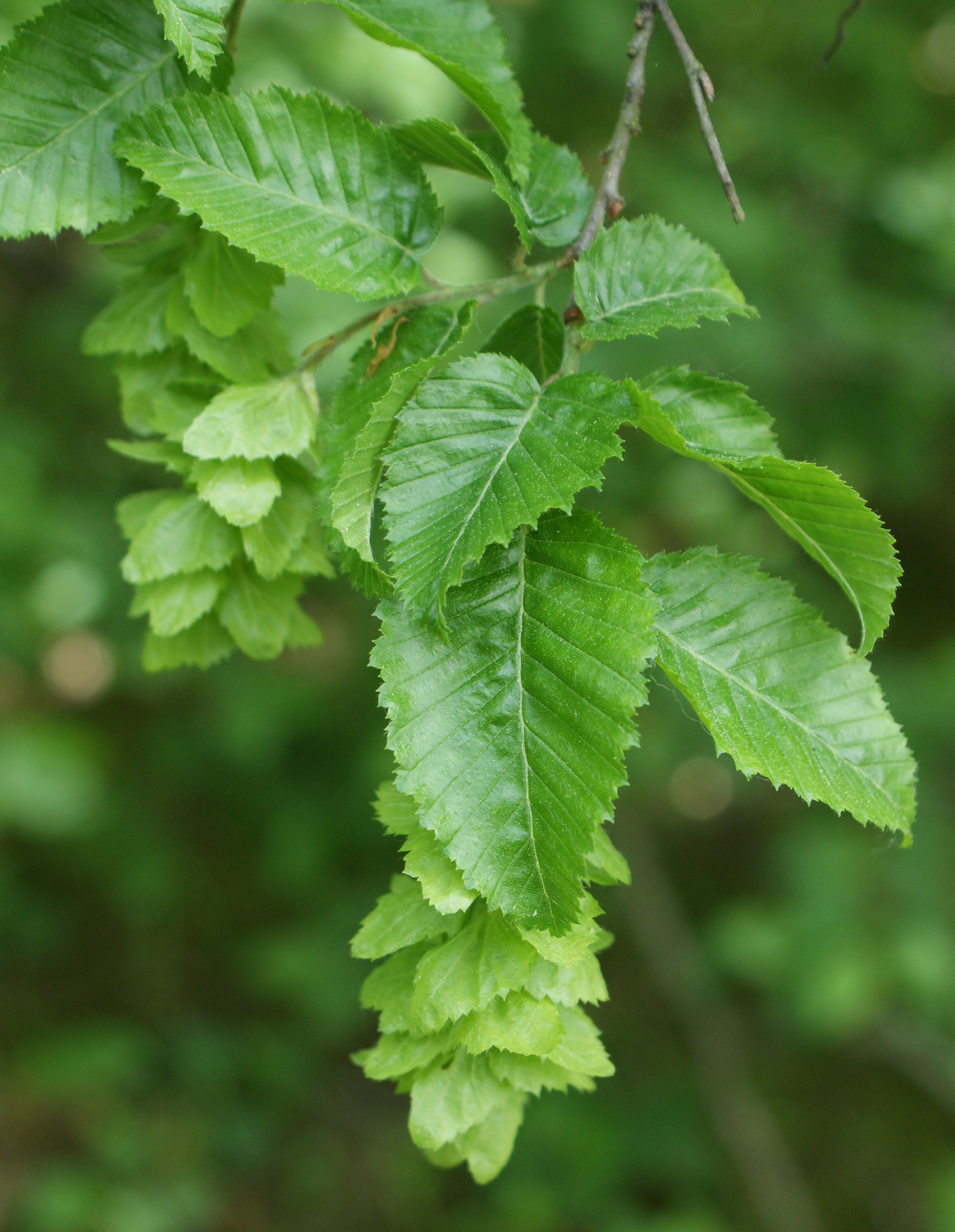
Foliage and fruit

Cultivation

In recent years, this species has been extensively used as an ornamental tree for bonsai.
