= Carpinus polyneura =

Conservation status
- Least Concern (IUCN 3.1)

Scientific classification
- Kingdom: Plantae
- Clade: Embryophytes
- Clade: Tracheophytes
- Clade: Angiosperms
- Clade: Eudicots
- Clade: Rosids
- Order: Fagales
- Family: Betulaceae
- Genus: Carpinus
- Species: C. polyneura

Binomial name
- Carpinus polyneura Franch.

Synonyms
- List: Carpinus glandulosopunctata (C.J.Qi) C.J.Qi; Carpinus handelii Rehder; Carpinus polyneura var. glandulosopunctulata C.J.Qi; Carpinus polyneura var. wilsoniana H.J.P.Winkl.; Carpinus sunpanensis W.Y.Hsia; Carpinus tsunyihensis Hu; Carpinus turczaninovii var. polyneura (Franch.) H.J.P.Winkl.

Species of plant

Carpinus polyneura is a species of flowering plant in the hornbeam genus Carpinus (family Betulaceae). It is native to southern China. A tree reaching 15 m (49 ft), it is typically found in subtropical deciduous forests and in thickets at elevations from 400 to 2,300 m (1,300 to 7,500 ft). It is available from commercial suppliers, and features reddish young leaves in the spring, mounted on purplish-brown twigs.

== Subtaxa ==
The following varieties are accepted:

- Carpinus polyneura var. polyneura – Sichuan, Hunan
- Carpinus polyneura var. sunpanensis (W.Y.Hsia) P.C.Li – Sichuan
- Carpinus polyneura var. tsunyihensis (Hu) P.C.Li – Guizhou
