= Carpinus fargesiana =

Conservation status
- Least Concern (IUCN 3.1)

Scientific classification
- Kingdom: Plantae
- Clade: Embryophytes
- Clade: Tracheophytes
- Clade: Angiosperms
- Clade: Eudicots
- Clade: Rosids
- Order: Fagales
- Family: Betulaceae
- Genus: Carpinus
- Species: C. fargesiana

Binomial name
- Carpinus fargesiana H.J.P.Winkl.

Synonyms
- Carpinus daginensis Hu; Carpinus fargesiana var. hwai (Hu & W.C.Cheng) P.C.Li; Carpinus fargesiana var. tchouana C.C.Yang; Carpinus hwai Hu & W.C.Cheng; Carpinus turczaninovii var. ovalifolia H.J.P.Winkl.

Species of plant

Carpinus fargesiana, the Chinese hornbeam, is a species of flowering plant in the family Betulaceae. It is native to central and southeast China. A tree reaching 20 m (66 ft), it is found in forested mountain valleys, typically along streambanks, at elevations from 1,000 to 2,600 m (3,300 to 8,500 ft). It is available from commercial suppliers.

== Subtaxa ==
The following varieties are accepted:

- Carpinus fargesiana var. fargesiana – entire range
- Carpinus fargesiana var. ovalifolia (H.J.P.Winkl.) Holstein & Weigend – South-Central China
