= Carpinus perryae =

Carpinus perryae Temporal range: Ypresian
- Carpinus parryaefruit

Scientific classification
- Kingdom: Plantae
- Clade: Tracheophytes
- Clade: Angiosperms
- Clade: Eudicots
- Clade: Rosids
- Order: Fagales
- Family: Betulaceae
- Genus: Carpinus
- Species: †C. perryae

Binomial name
- †Carpinus perryae Pigg, Manchester, & Wehr

Extinct species of hornbeam

Carpinus perryae is an extinct species of hornbeam known from fossil fruits found in the Klondike Mountain Formation deposits of northern Washington state, dated to the early Eocene Ypresian stage. Based on described features, C. perryae is the oldest definite species in the genus Carpinus.

== History and classification ==
Carpinus perryae was described from two type specimens, the holotype and paratype fertile bracts, numbered UWBM 71171, specimen A and B respectively. Both compression fossil specimens are preserved together on a single rock slab that is part of the Burke Museum paleobotanical collections. Found at the Klondike Mountain Formations UWBM site B2737, which is designated the type locality, the fossils were described by paleobotanists Pigg, Manchester, and Wehr (2003) along with Corylus johnsonii and Palaeocarpinus barksdaleae. The specific epithet perryae was coined as a matronym recognizing Madilane Perry for her work founding the Stonerose Interpretive Center in Republic, Washington.

Pigg, Manchester, and Wehr (2003) noted at the time of description that Carpinus perryae was the oldest confirmed hornbeam fossil placed in Carpinus, a status affirmed by Forest et al (2005) who used C perryae as a fossil calibration point for phylogenetic analysis of Betulaceae.

Based on six morphological character states that are present in the fossils ranging from nutlet and bract shape to serration of the bract, C. perryae was determined to be most similar to species in Carpinus subgenus Carpinus, such as Carpinus monbeigiana. A noted distinction between the modern species and the fossils is the overall bract shape, ovate in modern species, but obovate in C. perryae.

== Distribution and paleoecology ==
Carpinus perryae is known from a single location in the Eocene Okanagan Highlands, an outcrop of the Ypresian Klondike Mountain Formation in Republic. The formation preserves an upland lake system surrounded by a mixed conifer–broadleaf forest with nearby volcanism. The pollen flora has notable elements of birch and golden larch, and distinct trace amounts of fir, spruce, cypress, and palm. Wolfe and Tanai (1987) interpreted the forest climate to have been microthermal, having distinct seasonal temperature swings which dipped below freezing in the winters. However, further study has shown the lake system was surrounded by a warm temperate ecosystem that likely had a mesic upper microthermal to lower mesothermal climate, in which winter temperatures rarely dropped low enough for snow, and which were seasonably equitable. The Okanagan Highlands paleoforest surrounding the lakes have been described as precursors to the modern temperate broadleaf and mixed forests of Eastern North America and Eastern Asia. Based on the fossil biotas, the lakes were higher and cooler then the coeval coastal forests preserved in the Puget Group and Chuckanut Formation of Western Washington, which are described as lowland tropical forest ecosystems. Estimates of the paleoelevation range between 700–1,200 m (2,300–3,900 ft) higher than the coastal forests. This is consistent with the paleoelevation estimates for the lake systems, which range between 1,100–2,900 m (3,600–9,500 ft), which is similar to the modern elevation of 800 m (2,600 ft), but higher.

Estimates of the mean annual temperature for the Klondike Mountain Formation have been derived from climate leaf analysis multivariate program (CLAMP) analysis and leaf margin analysis (LMA) of the Republic paleoflora. The CLAMP results, after multiple linear regressions for Republic, gave a mean annual temperature of approximately 8.0 °C (46.4 °F), while the LMA gave 9.2 ± 2.0 °C (48.6 ± 3.6 °F). This is lower than the mean annual temperature estimates given for the coastal Puget Group, which is estimated to have been between 15 and 18.6 °C (59.0 and 65.5 °F). The bioclimatic analysis for Republic suggests mean annual precipitation amounts of 115 ± 39 cm (45 ± 15 in).

C. perryae is one of several birch-alder family species described from the Republic site. Two other members of subfamily Coryloideae have also been described from the Klondike Mountain Formation, Corylus johnsonii and Palaeocarpinus barksdaleae, while an additional two species Alnus parvifolia and Betula leopoldae are known from subfamily Betuloideae.

== Description ==
The Carpinus perryae fruits have a basal nutlet 5.5–6 mm (0.22–0.24 in) by 3.3–4.0 mm (0.13–0.16 in) wide which is enclosed by an asymmetrical wing-shaped bract. The elongated bract is 22–25 mm (0.87–0.98 in) long and only 6–8 mm (0.24–0.31 in) wide, giving an obovate outline, and arises from the upper margin on the nutlet. Along the margins of the bract are small widely spaced teeth which are obtuse to nearly spiny in morphology. Five to six veins originate at the attachment region of the nutlet and extend upwards through the bract. One to two primary veins are present on the narrower side of the bract and the other three to four on the wider side with the widest primary vein slightly offset from the bract center and running to the bract apex. Secondary veins branch from the either side of the primaries in alternating fashion, and tertiary veins connect the secondaries at right angles. The primary veins terminate in the teeth, with the other teeth vascularized by secondary veins.
