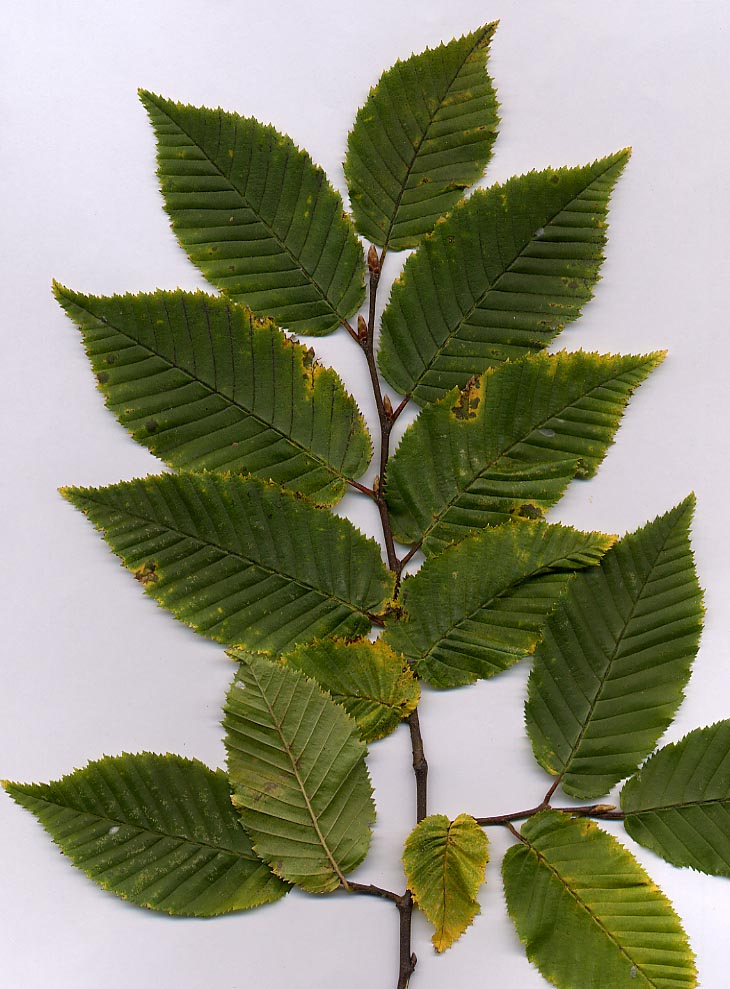
- European hornbeam foliage

Scientific classification
- Kingdom: Plantae
- Clade: Embryophytes
- Clade: Tracheophytes
- Clade: Spermatophytes
- Clade: Angiosperms
- Clade: Eudicots
- Clade: Rosids
- Order: Fagales
- Family: Betulaceae
- Subfamily: Coryloideae
- Genus: Carpinus; L. (1753)

Synonyms
- Distegocarpus Siebold & Zucc. (1846)

= Hornbeam =

Hornbeam Temporal range: 49.42–0 Ma Ypresian–Recent

Genus of flowering plants

Hornbeams are hardwood trees in the plant genus Carpinus in the family Betulaceae. Its species occur across much of the temperate regions of the Northern Hemisphere.

== Common names ==
The common English name hornbeam derives from the hardness of the woods (likened to horn) and the Old English beam, "tree" (cognate with West Frisian beam, Dutch boom and German Baum).

The American hornbeam is also occasionally known as blue-beech, ironwood, or musclewood, the first from the resemblance of the bark to that of the American beech Fagus grandifolia, the other two from the hardness of the wood and the muscled appearance of the trunk and limbs.

The botanical name for the genus, Carpinus, is the original Latin name for the European species, although some etymologists derive it from the Celtic for a yoke.

== Description ==
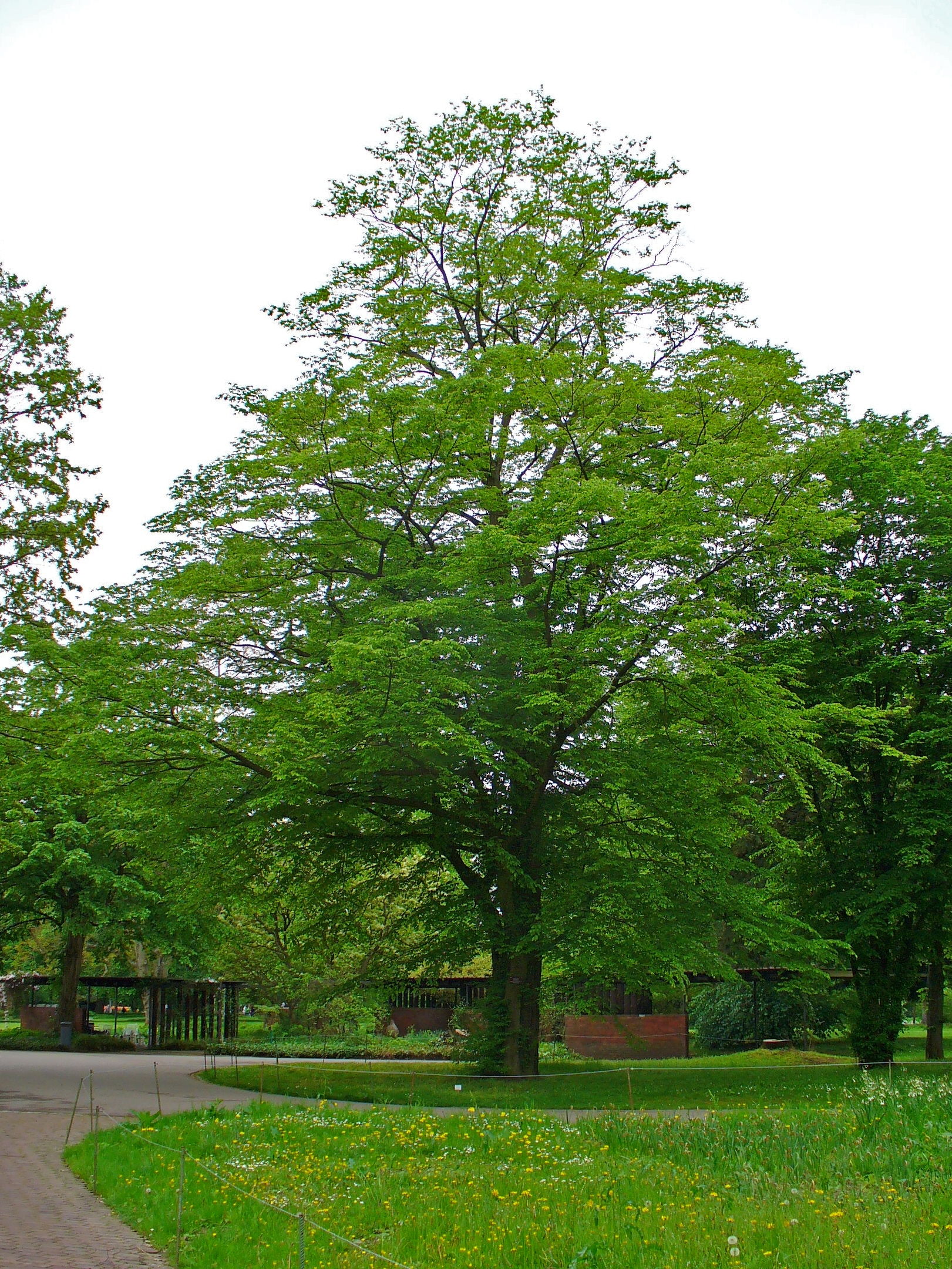
European hornbeam in Germany, during May

Hornbeams are small, slow-growing, understory trees with a natural, rounded form growing 4.5–9 metres (15–30 feet) tall and wide; the exemplar species—the European hornbeam—reaches a maximum height of 32 m (105 ft).

Leaves are deciduous, dark-green, alternate and simple with a coarsely-serrated margin, varying from 3 to 10 centimetres (1 to 4 inches) in length. In autumn, leaves turn various shades of yellow, orange and red. Hornbeam saplings, stressed trees, and the lower branches of mature trees may exhibit marcescence—where leaves wither with autumn but abscission (leafdrop) is delayed until spring.

The smooth, gray trunk and larger branches of a mature tree exhibit a distinctive muscle-like fluting.

As with other members of the birch family, hornbeam flowers are wind-pollinated pendulous catkins, produced in spring. Male and female flowers are on separate catkins, but on the same tree (monoecious). Female flowers give way to distinctive clusters of winged seeds that somewhat resemble the hops-like seeds of ironwood.

The fruit is a small nut about 3–6 millimetres (1/8–1/4 in) long, held in a leafy bract; the bract may be either trilobed or simple oval, and is slightly asymmetrical. The asymmetry of the seedwing makes it spin as it falls, improving wind dispersal. The shape of the wing is important in the identification of different hornbeam species. Typically, 10–30 seeds are on each seed catkin.

== Taxonomy ==
Formerly some taxonomists segregated them with the genera Corylus (hazels) and Ostrya (hop-hornbeams) in a separate family, Corylaceae. Modern botanists place Carpinus in the subfamily Coryloideae of the family Betulaceae. Species of Carpinus are often grouped into two subgenera Carpinus subgenus Carpinus and Carpinus subgenus Distegicarpus.

Phylogentic analyses have shown that Ostrya likely evolved from a Carpinus ancestor somewhere in C. subg. Distegicarpus making Carpinus paraphyletic. The fossil record of the genus extends back to the Early Eocene, Ypresian of northwestern North America, with the species Carpinus perryae described from fossil fruits found in the Klondike Mountain Formation of Republic, Washington.

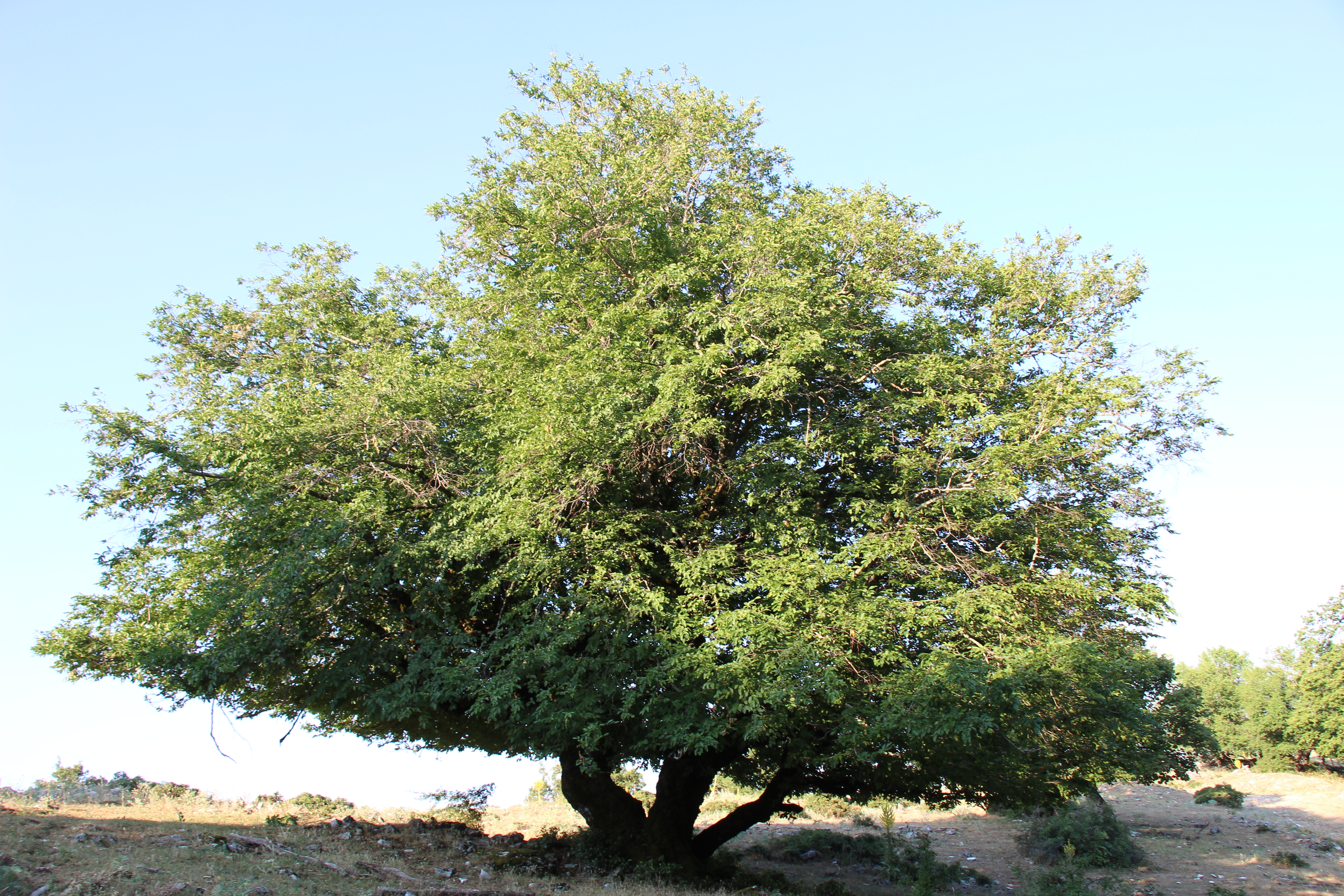
Carpinus austrobalcanica, southern Balkan hornbeam, first described 2024

=== Species ===
45 species are currently accepted.

- Carpinus austrobalcanica N.Kuzmanović, D.Lakušić, I.Stevanoski, P.Schönswetter, B.Frajman – Southern Albania, Northwestern Greece
- Carpinus betulus L. – European hornbeam - Europe to Western Asia; naturalized in North America.
- Carpinus caroliniana Walter – American hornbeam - Eastern North America
- Carpinus chuniana Hu – Guangdong, Guizhou, Hubei
- Carpinus cordata Blume – Sawa hornbeam - Primorye, China, Korea, Japan
- Carpinus dayongiana K.W.Liu & Q.Z.Lin – Hunan
- Carpinus faginea Lindl. – Nepal, Himalayas of northern India
- Carpinus fangiana Hu – Sichuan, Guangxi
- Carpinus fargesiana H.J.P.Winkl. – central and east-central China
- Carpinus firmifolia (H.J.P.Winkl.) Hu – Guizhou: Guiyang Shi
- Carpinus gigabracteatus Z.Qiang Lu – Yunnan
- Carpinus hebestroma Yamam. – Taiwan
- Carpinus henryana (H.J.P.Winkl.) H.J.P.Winkl. – southern China
- Carpinus insularis N.H.Xia, K.S.Pang & Y.H.Tong – Hong Kong
- Carpinus japonica Blume – Japanese hornbeam - Japan
- Carpinus kawakamii Hayata – Taiwan, southeastern China
- Carpinus kweichowensis Hu – Guizhou, Yunnan
- Carpinus langaoensis Z. Qiang Lu & J. Quan Liu – Shaanxi, China
- Carpinus laxiflora (Siebold & Zucc.) Blume – Aka-shide hornbeam - Japan, Korea
- Carpinus lipoensis Y.K.Li – Guizhou
- Carpinus londoniana H.J.P.Winkl. – southern China, northern Indochina
- Carpinus luochengensis J.Y.Liang – Guangxi
- Carpinus mengshanensis S.B.Liang & F.Z.Zhao – Shandong
- Carpinus microphylla Z.C.Chen ex Y.S.Wang & J.P.Huang – Guangxi
- Carpinus mollicoma Hu – Tibet, Sichuan, Yunnan
- Carpinus monbeigiana Hand.-Mazz. – Tibet, Yunnan
- Carpinus omeiensis Hu & W.P.Fang – Sichuan, Guizhou
- Carpinus orientalis Mill. – Oriental hornbeam - Hungary, Balkans, Italy, Crimea, Turkey, Iran, Caucasus
- Carpinus paohsingensis W.Y.Hsia – China
- †Carpinus perryae Pigg, Manchester, & Wehr, 2003 - Ypresian, Klondike Mountain Formation
- Carpinus polyneura Franch. – southern China
- Carpinus pubescens Burkill – China, Vietnam
- Carpinus purpurinervis Hu – Guizhou, Guangxi
- Carpinus putoensis W.C.Cheng – Putuo hornbeam - Zhejiang
- Carpinus rankanensis Hayata – Taiwan
- Carpinus rupestris A.Camus – Yunnan, Guangxi, Guizhou
- Carpinus × schuschaensis H.J.P.Winkl. (C. betulus × C. orientalis) – Caucasus and northern Iran
- Carpinus shensiensis Hu – Gansu, Shaanxi
- Carpinus shimenensis C.J.Qi – Hunan
- †Carpinus tengshongensis W.C.Cheng – Pliocene Yunnan
- Carpinus tibetana Z.Qiang Lu & J.Quan Liu – Tibet
- Carpinus tientaiensis W.C.Cheng – Zhejiang: Tianmu Shan
- Carpinus tropicalis (Donn.Sm.) Lundell – Mexico, Central America
- Carpinus tsaiana Hu – Yunnan, Guizhou
- Carpinus tschonoskii Maxim. – Asian Hornbeam, Chonosuki's Hornbeam - southern China, Korea, Japan
- Carpinus turczaninovii Hance – Korean hornbeam - China, Korea, Japan
- Carpinus viminea Lindl. ex Wall. – China, Korea, Himalayas, northern Indochina

== Distribution and habitat ==
The 45 species occur across much of the temperate regions of the northern hemisphere, with the greatest number of species in east Asia, particularly China. Only three species occur in Europe, only one in eastern North America, and one in Mesoamerica. Carpinus betulus can be found in Europe and Turkey.

== Ecology ==
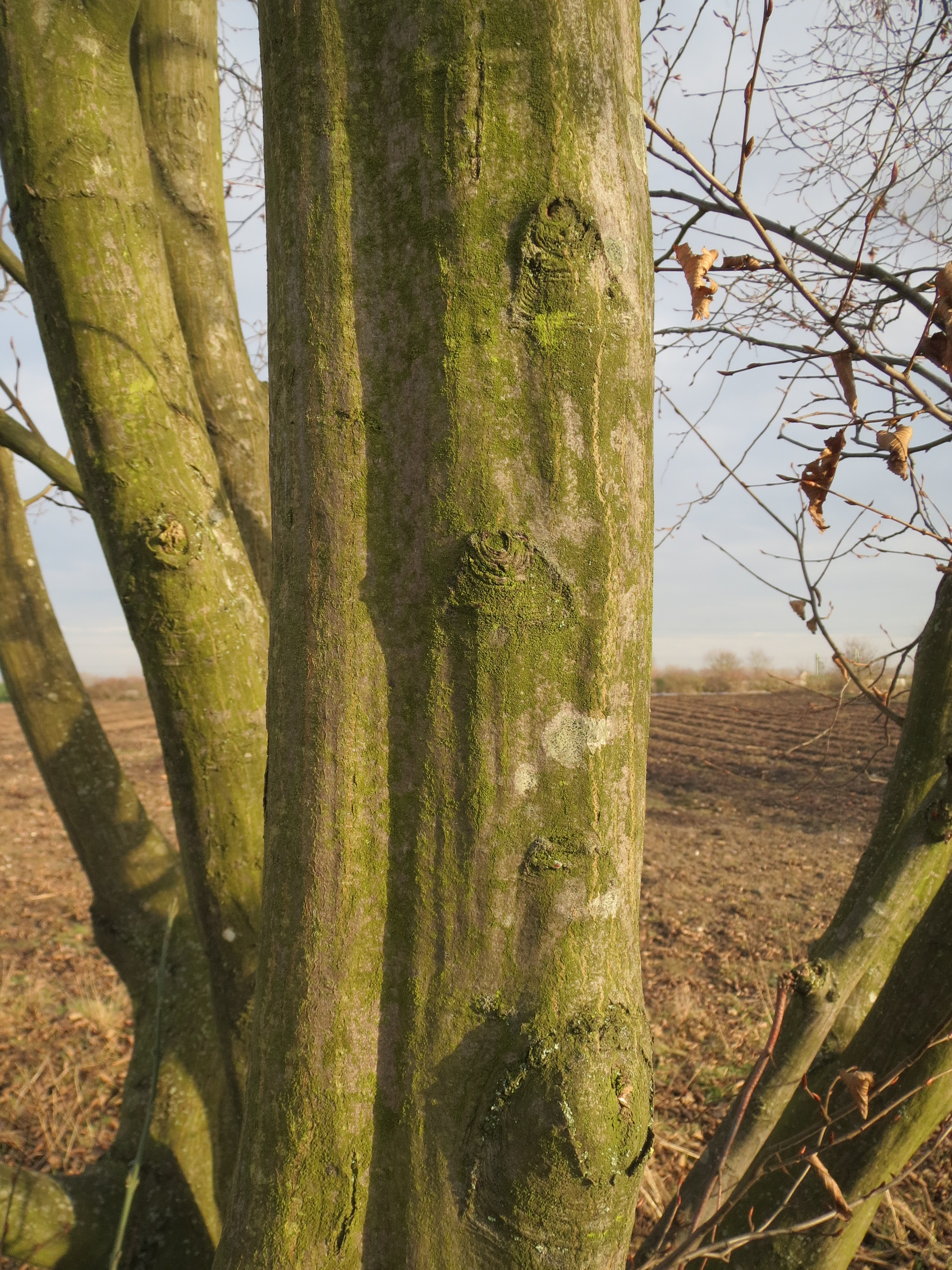
Hornbeam trunk

Hornbeams are used as food plants by the larvae of some Lepidoptera species, including autumnal moth, common emerald, feathered thorn, walnut sphinx, Svensson's copper underwing, and winter moth (recorded on European hornbeam) as well as the Coleophora case-bearers C. currucipennella and C. ostryae.

== Uses ==
Hornbeams yield a very hard timber, giving rise to the name "ironwood". Dried heartwood billets are nearly white and are suitable for decorative use. For general carpentry, hornbeam is rarely used, partly due to the difficulty of working it.

The wood is used to construct carving boards, tool handles, handplane soles, coach wheels, piano actions, shoe lasts, and other products where a very tough, hard wood is required.

The wood can also be used as gear pegs in simple machines, including traditional windmills. It is sometimes coppiced to provide hardwood poles. It is also used in parquet flooring and for making chess pieces.
