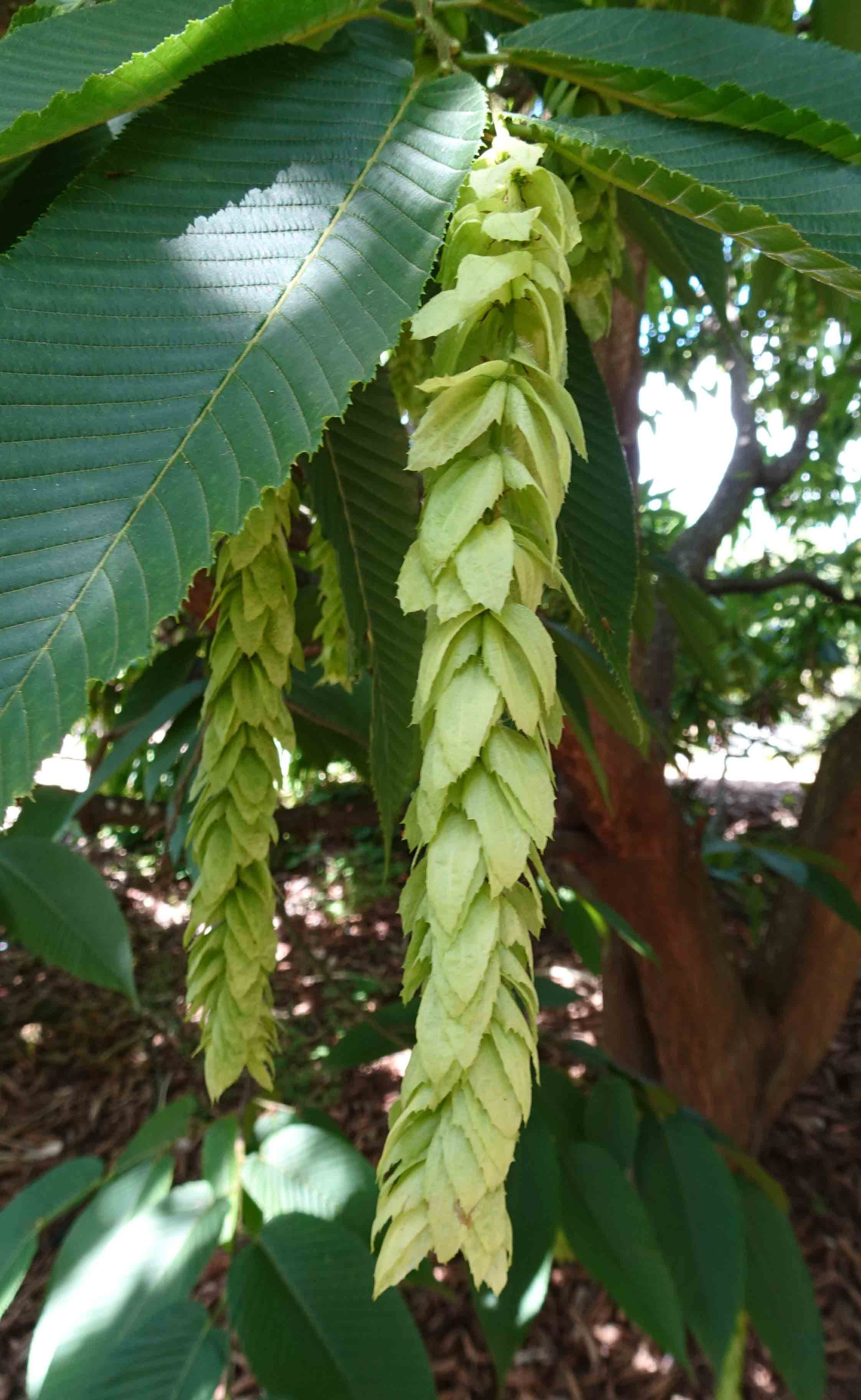
- Catkins can be 50 cm (20 in) long

Conservation status
- Least Concern (IUCN 3.1)

Scientific classification
- Kingdom: Plantae
- Clade: Embryophytes
- Clade: Tracheophytes
- Clade: Angiosperms
- Clade: Eudicots
- Clade: Rosids
- Order: Fagales
- Family: Betulaceae
- Genus: Carpinus
- Species: C. fangiana

Binomial name
- Carpinus fangiana Hu

Synonyms
- Carpinus wilsoniana Hu

= Carpinus fangiana =

Species of plant

Carpinus fangiana, the monkeytail hornbeam, is a species of flowering plant in the family Betulaceae. It is native to southern China; Sichuan, eastern Yunnan, northern Guangxi, and Guizhou. A tree reaching 20 m (66 ft), it is typically found in forested mountain valleys at elevations from 900 to 2,000 m (3,000 to 6,600 ft). It is available from commercial suppliers.
