= Carpinus hebestroma =

Conservation status
- Critically Endangered (IUCN 3.1)

Scientific classification
- Kingdom: Plantae
- Clade: Embryophytes
- Clade: Tracheophytes
- Clade: Angiosperms
- Clade: Eudicots
- Clade: Rosids
- Order: Fagales
- Family: Betulaceae
- Genus: Carpinus
- Species: C. hebestroma

Binomial name
- Carpinus hebestroma Yamam.

Species of plant

Carpinus hebestroma is a species of flowering plant in the family Betulaceae, native to Taiwan. A tree reaching 8 m (26 ft), it is found growing on forest slopes at elevations from 1,000 to 1,500 m (3,300 to 4,900 ft). Found in only one location in Hualien County, it is assessed as Critically Endangered due to repeated monsoon-induced landslides.
