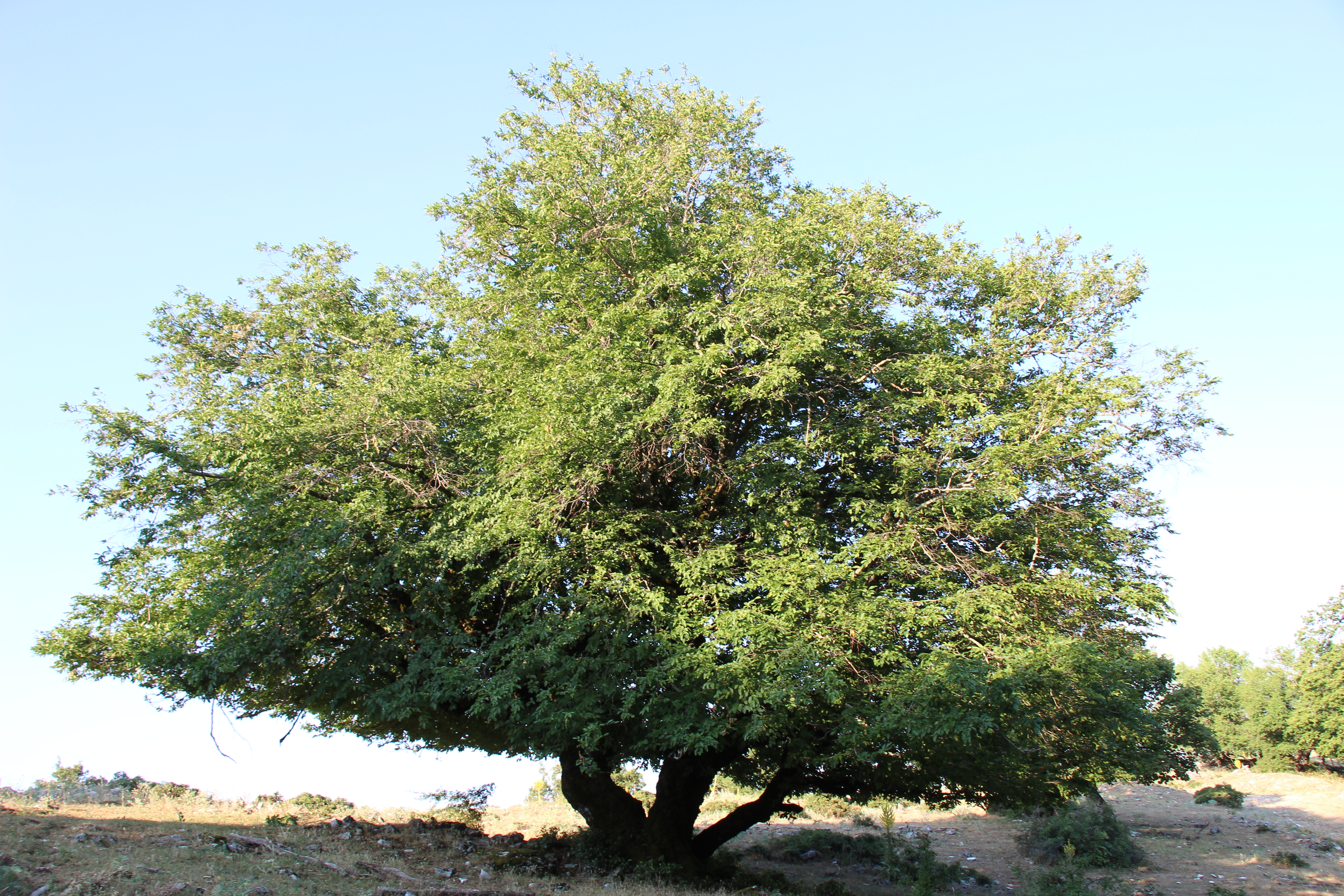

Scientific classification
- Kingdom: Plantae
- Clade: Tracheophytes
- Clade: Angiosperms
- Clade: Eudicots
- Clade: Rosids
- Order: Fagales
- Family: Betulaceae
- Genus: Carpinus
- Species: C. austrobalcanica

Binomial name
- Carpinus austrobalcanica Nevena Kuzmanović, Dmitar Lakušić, Ivana Stevanoski, Peter Schönswetter, Božo Frajman
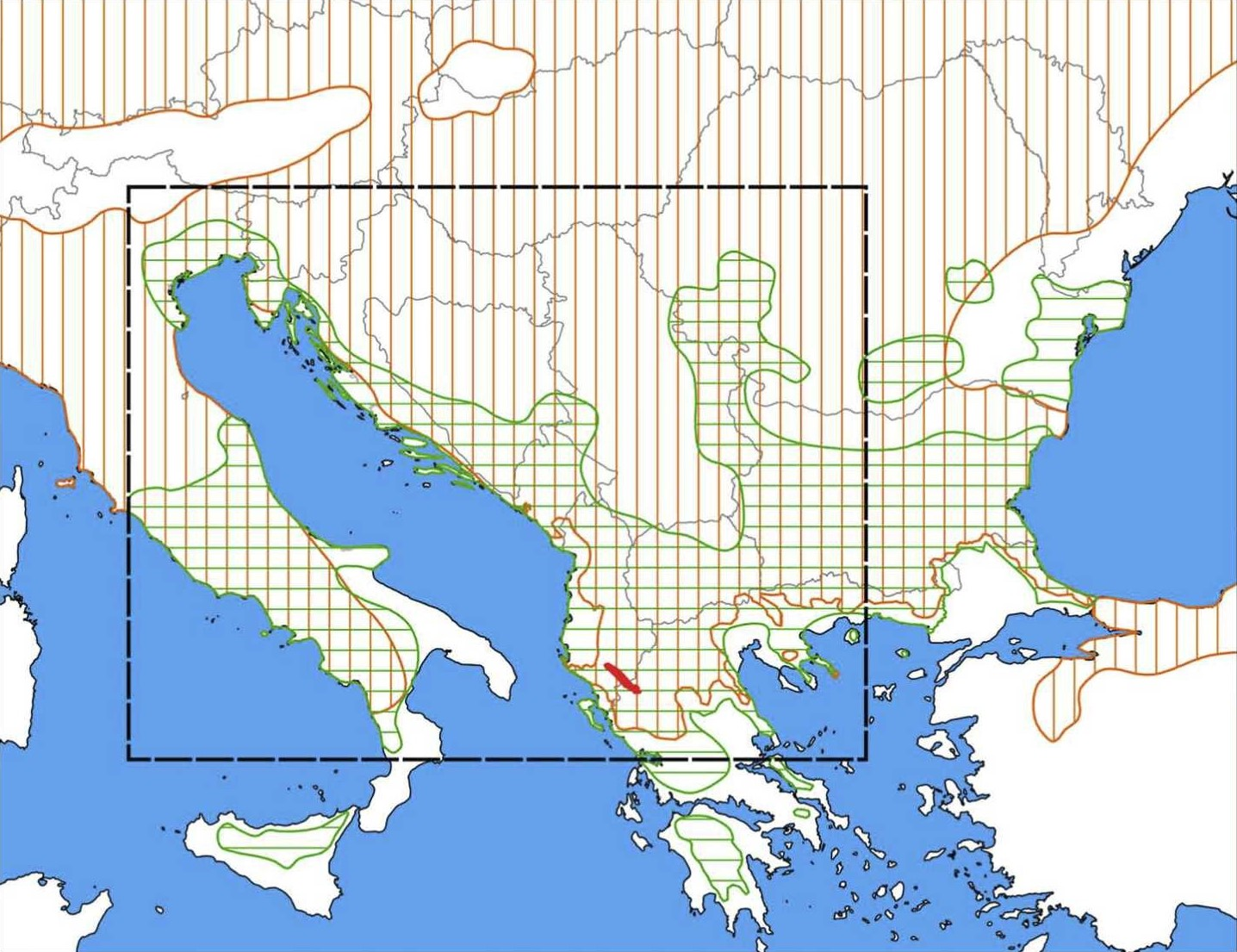
- Distribution of Carpinus austrobalcanica (in red). The ranges of Carpinus orientalis (green horizontal lines) and C. betulus (orange vertical lines) are also indicated.

= Carpinus austrobalcanica =

Species of tree

Carpinus austrobalcanica, the southern Balkan hornbeam, is a species of hardwood tree in the family Betulaceae, subfamily Coryloideae, native only to the southern Balkan Peninsula, in particular southern Albania and northwestern Greece. First described in 2024 it is, with the European hornbeam (Carpinus betulus) and the Oriental hornbeam (Carpinus orientalis), one of three hornbeams native to Europe.

== Description ==
C. austrobalcanica is a deciduous tree reaching heights up to 15 meters. It is "closely related" to, but differs from the similar common European hornbeam (Carpinus betulus) in a number of characters. Differences can be observed in the structure and colour of the bark, which is deeply fissured into centimetre-sized scales, and light brown to brown. In this respect, C. austrobalcanica is more similar to European hophornbeam (Ostrya carpinifolia). Additionally, the buds are obovate, while those of common hornbeam have a pointed shape.

The leaf structure also varies, with Carpinus austrobalcanica having a flat leaf surface that is not wavy, while the other species (common hornbeam) has strongly wavy leaves. The leaf venation in C. austrobalcanica is not pronounced and more or less in the plane of the leaf surface. In contrast, common hornbeam has a pronounced venation.

The Inflorescences of C. austrobalcanica are very elongated, up to 25 cm, interrupted, and usually clearly longer than the supporting leaf, those of common hornbeam are dense, up to 15 cm, rarely clearly interrupted, and usually only slightly longer than the supporting leaf.

== Evolution ==
Within Carpinus, C. austrobalcanica is most closely related to the European hornbeam, but is distinct not only in morphology, but also in its genome. Based on the European hornbeam's evolutionary origin in the Pliocene, C. austrobalcanica is assumed to have diverged from that species in the late Pliocene or early Pleistocene, a divergence that was accompanied by an adaptation to different, more thermophilous ecological conditions.

== Distribution and habitat ==
C. austrobalcanica is currently known only from a limited range in the northern Pindus of Albania and Greece, specifically the Nemërçka and Tymphe mountain ranges. Here it occurs at altitudes ranging from 850 to 1500m in mixed to almost monodominant stands, in xero-thermophilous communities along with oaks (Quercus petraea, Q. pubescens, Q. trojana), other Coryloidae (Carpinus orientalis, Ostrya carpinifolia), maples (Acer monspessulanum, A. pseudoplatanus), rosaceous species (Aria graeca, Prunus mahaleb), broad-leaved lime (Tilia platyphyllos), eastern prickly juniper (Juniperus deltoides), Judas tree (Cercis siliquastrum) and tanner's sumach (Rhus coriaria), on calcareous soils.

== Gallery ==
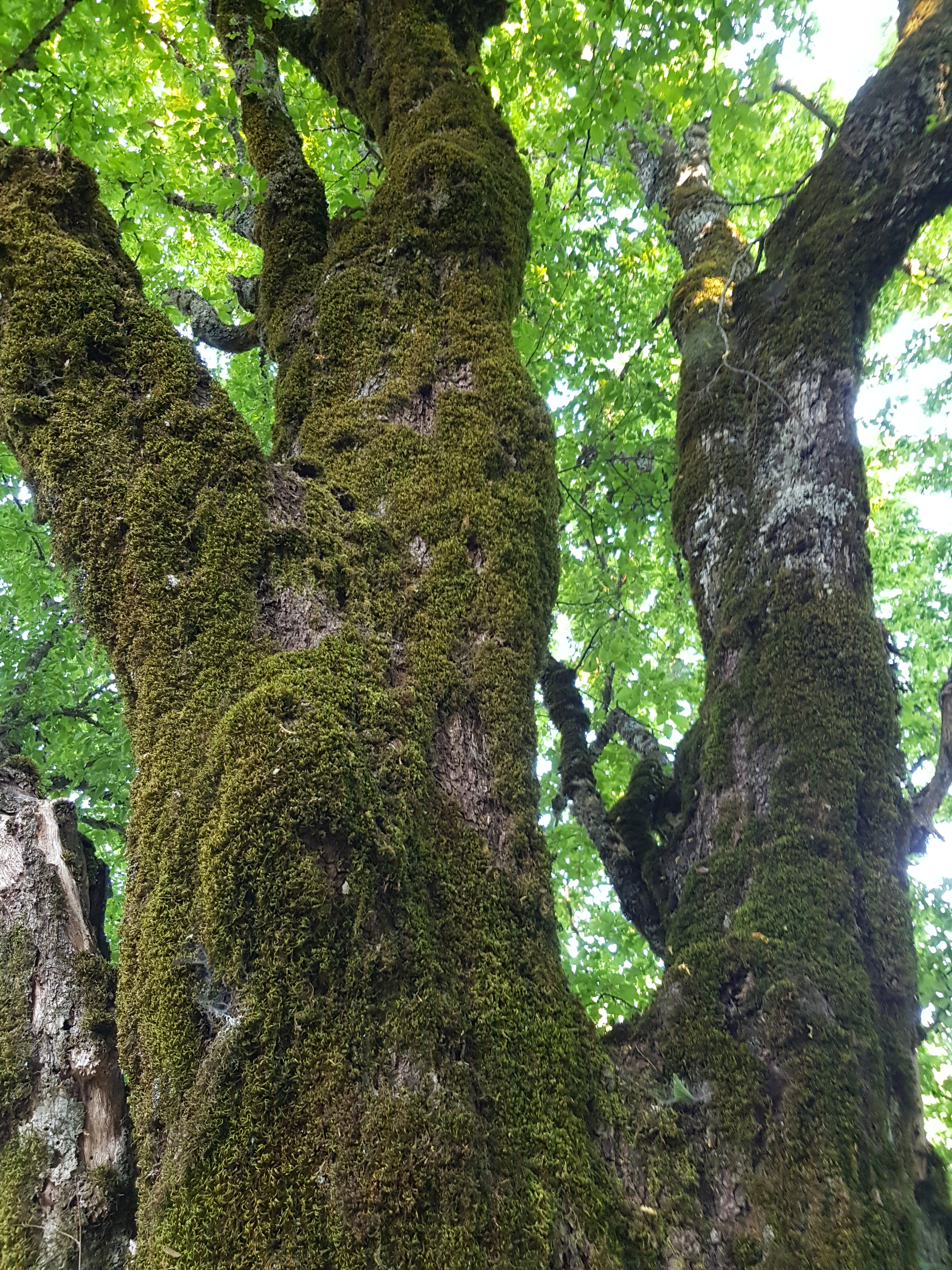
Trunk (with moss)

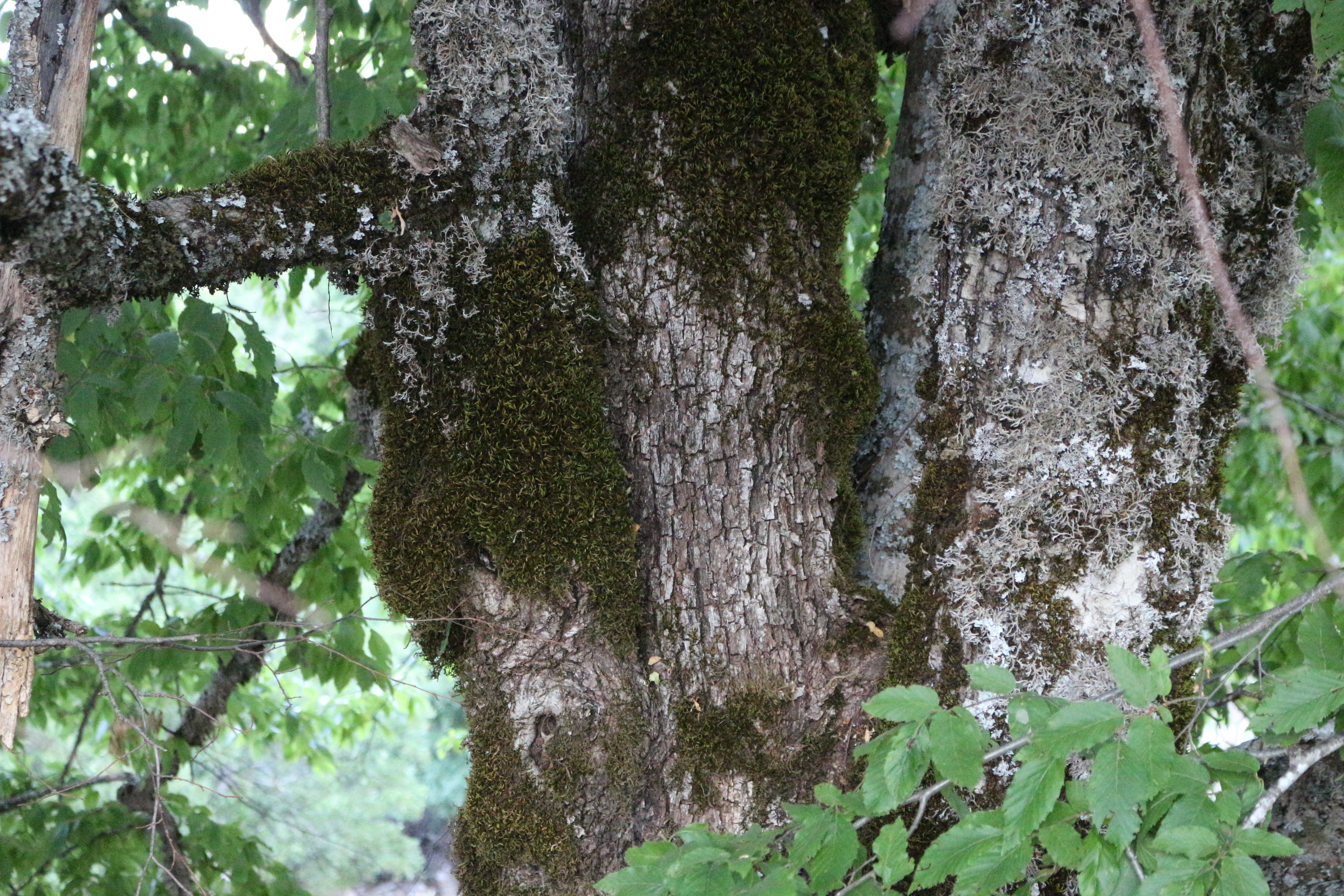
Bark (with moss and lichens)

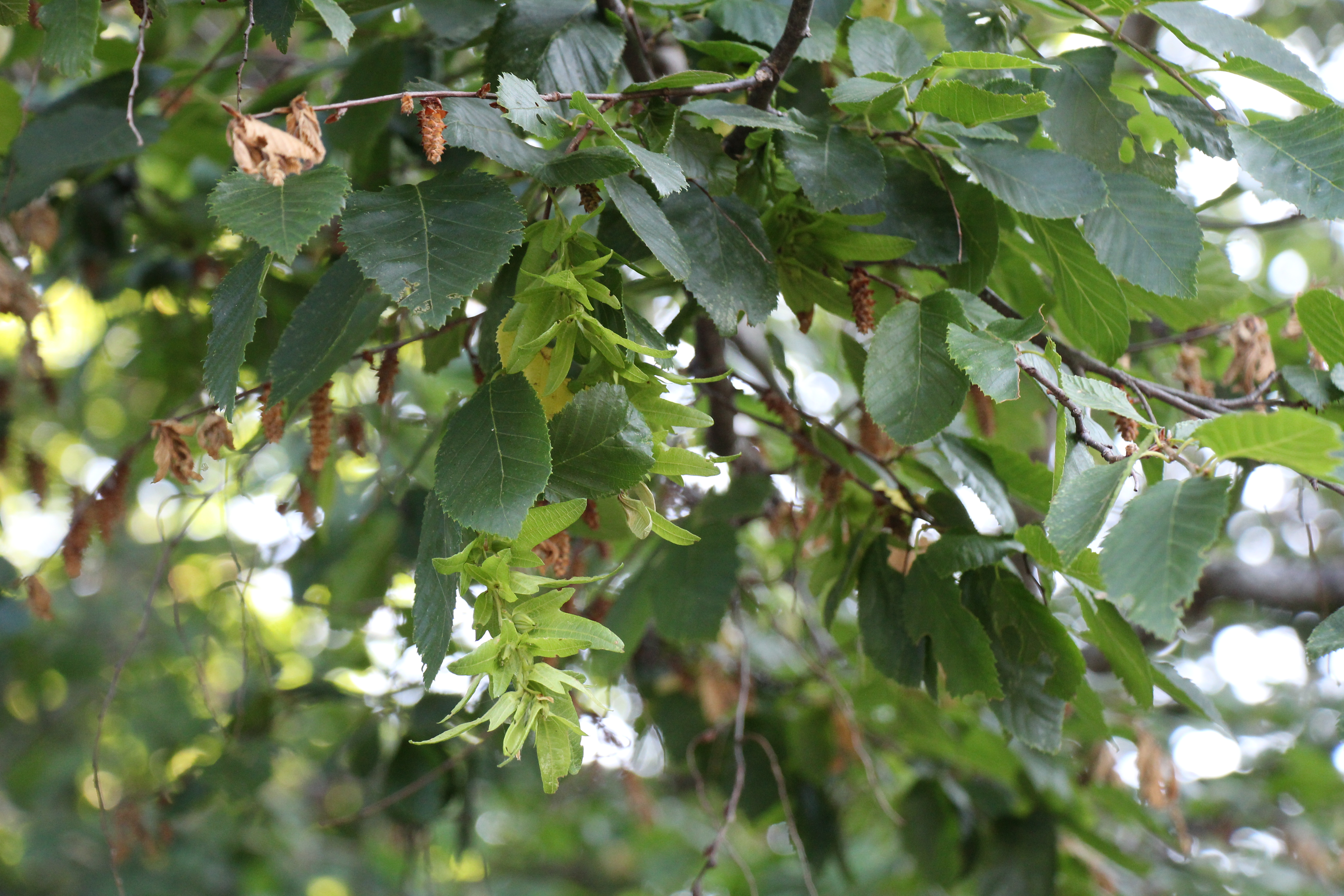
Leaves and inflorescences

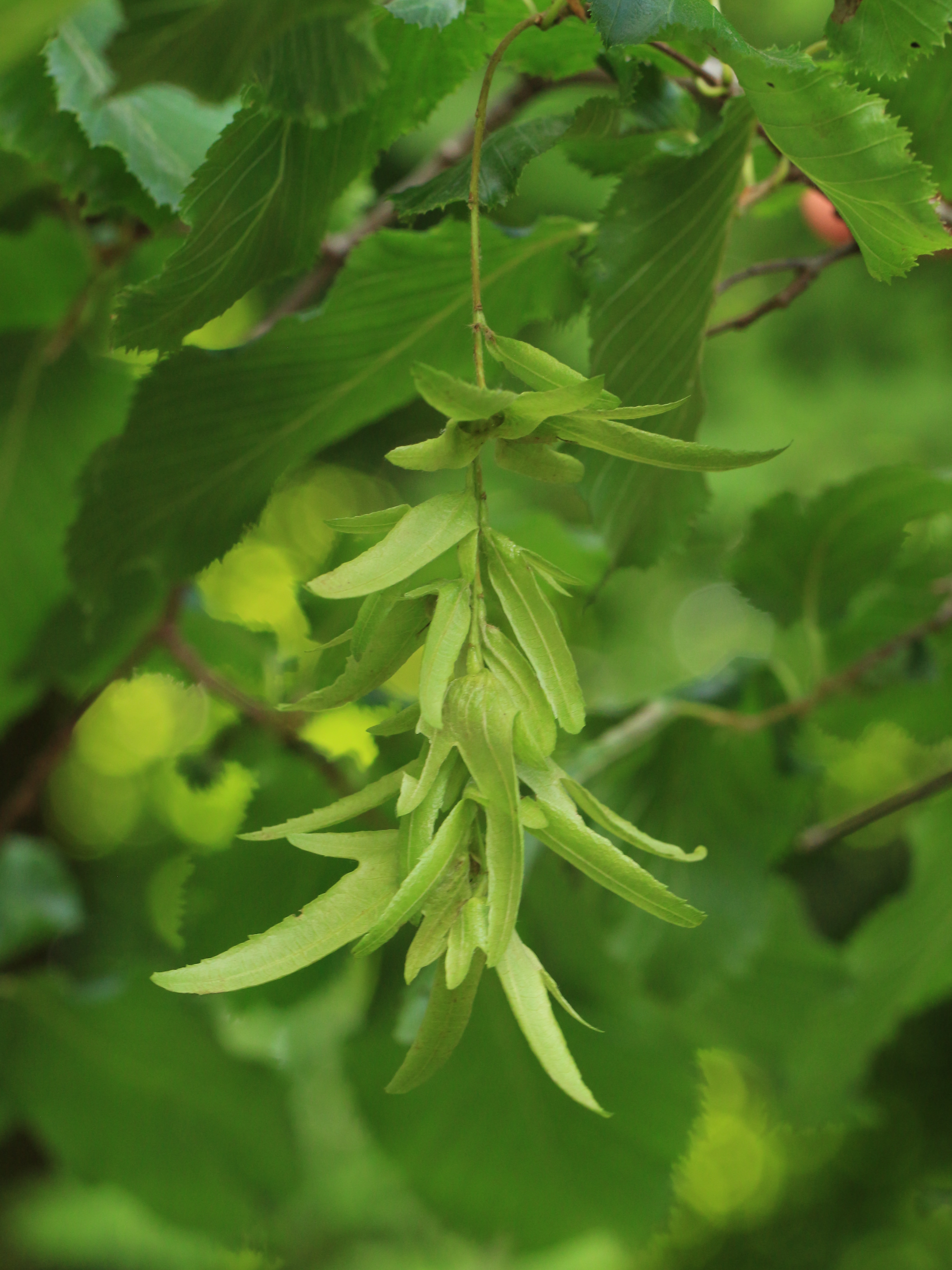
Inflorescence

== Discovery ==
The species was first described in 2024 by scientists from University of Belgrade and University of Innsbruck.
