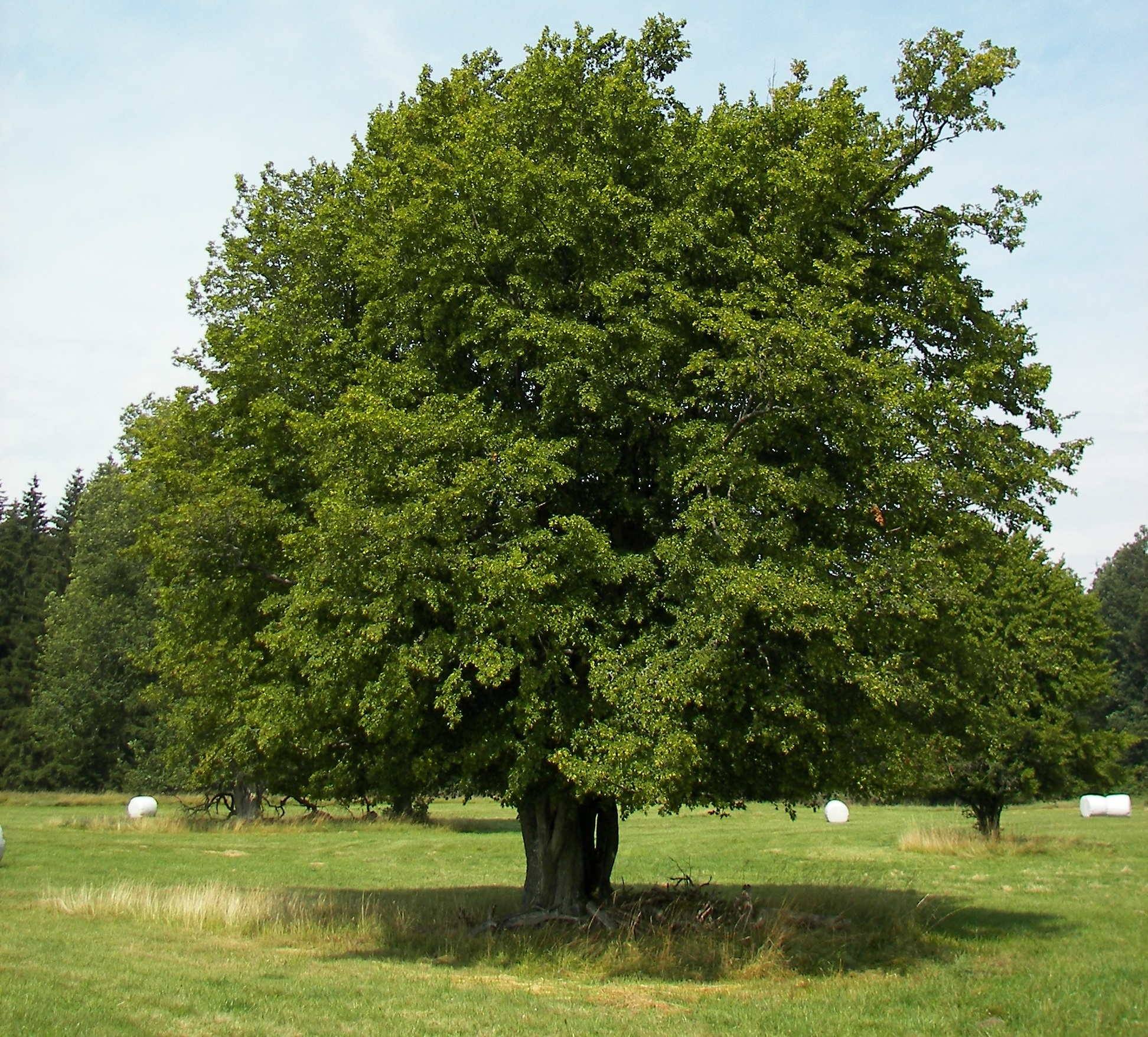
- Tree in summer

Conservation status
- Least Concern (IUCN 3.1)

Scientific classification
- Kingdom: Plantae
- Clade: Tracheophytes
- Clade: Angiosperms
- Clade: Eudicots
- Clade: Rosids
- Order: Fagales
- Family: Betulaceae
- Genus: Carpinus
- Species: C. betulus

Binomial name
- Carpinus betulus L.
- Distribution map

= Carpinus betulus =

Species of tree

Carpinus betulus, the European or common hornbeam, is a species of tree in the birch family Betulaceae, native to Western Asia and central, eastern, and southern Europe, including southern England. It requires a warm climate for good growth, and occurs only at elevations up to 1,000 metres (3,300 ft). It grows in mixed stands with oak, and in some areas beech, and is also a common tree in scree forests. Hornbeam was also known as yoke elm. Together with Carpinus orientalis and Carpinus austrobalcanica, it is one of the three hornbeams found in Europe.

== Description ==
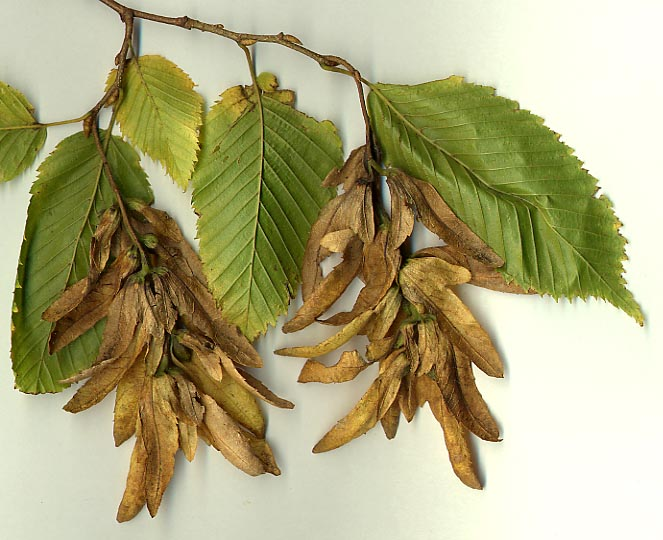
Hornbeam seed clusters

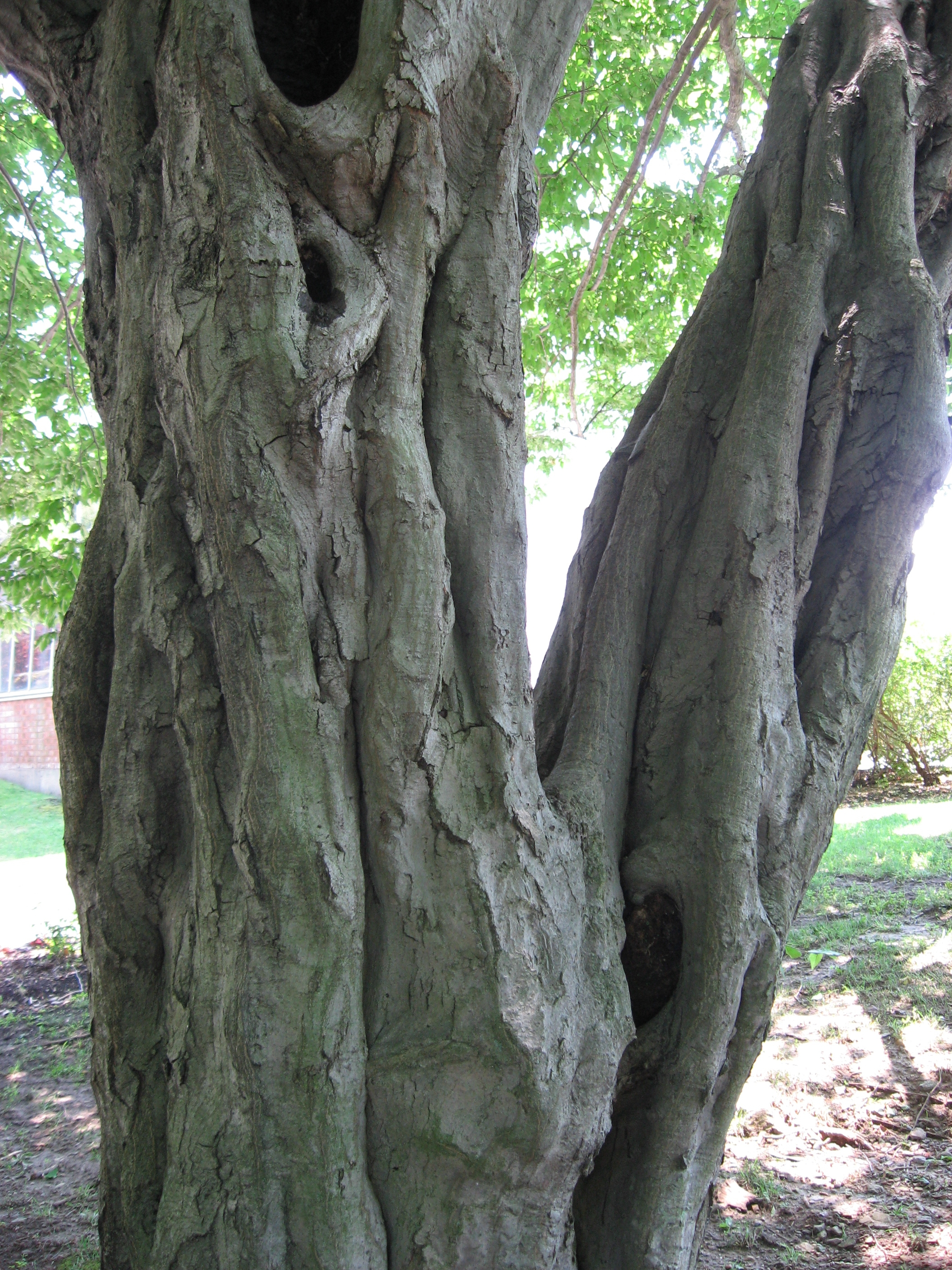
Bark of a mature tree

It is a deciduous small to medium-size tree reaching heights of 15–25 metres (49–82 ft), rarely 30 m (98 ft), and often has a fluted and crooked trunk. The bark is smooth and greenish-grey, even in old trees. The buds, unlike those of the beech, are 10 mm (0.39 in) long at the most, and pressed close to the twig. The leaves are alternate, 4–9 cm (1.6–3.5 in) long, with prominent veins giving a distinctive corrugated texture, and a serrated margin. It is monoecious, and the wind-pollinated male and female catkins appear in early summer after the leaves. The fruit is a small 7–8 mm (0.28–0.31 in) long nut, partially surrounded by a three-pointed leafy involucre 3–4 cm (1.2–1.6 in) long; it matures in autumn.

Distribution

Hornbeam is considered native from Western Asia and throughout Europe. The species prefers a warm climate, and only naturally occurs below 1,000 metres (3,281 ft) in elevation. It is a common tree in scree forests.

Hornbeam was frequently coppiced and pollarded in the past in England. It is still infrequently managed using these traditional methods, but mainly for non-commercial conservation purposes. As a woodland tree traditionally managed in this way, it is particularly frequent in the ancient woodlands of south Essex, Hertfordshire and north Kent where it typically occupies more than half of most ancient woods and wood pastures.

There are a number of notable forests where C. betulus is a dominant tree species, among which include Epping Forest in the United Kingdom, and Halltorps hage in Öland, Sweden.

=== Fossil record ===
Three fossil fruits of Carpinus betulus have been extracted from borehole samples of the Middle Miocene fresh water deposits in Nowy Sacz Basin, West Carpathians, Poland.

== Ecology ==
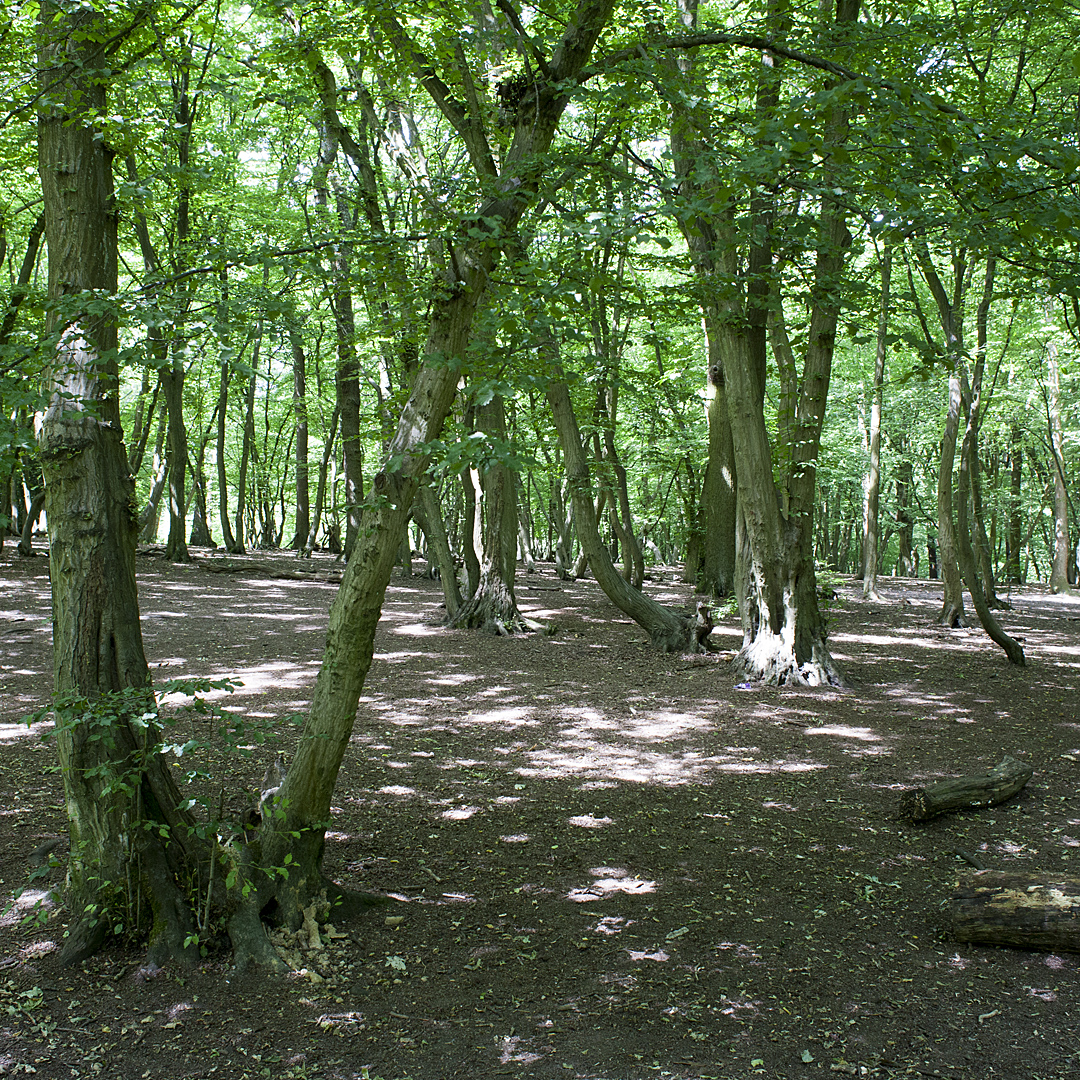
Old hornbeam coppice stools left uncut for at least 100 years. Coldfall Wood, London

In England, trees appear to prefer soils with a pH from 3.6 to 4.6 but tolerate up to 7.6. They are found on soils with moderate clay content and avoid soils with particularly high or low clay content. Carpinus betulus likes full sun or partial shade, moderate soil fertility and moisture. It has a shallow, wide-spreading root system and is marked by the production of stump sprouts when cut back.

The seeds often do not germinate until the spring of the second year after sowing. The hornbeam is a prolific seeder and is marked by vigorous natural regeneration.

=== Associated species ===
Hornbeam grows in mixed stands with oak, and in some areas beech. The leaves provide food for some animals, including Lepidoptera such as the case-bearer moth Coleophora anatipennella.

This tree has been associated with the poisonous mushroom Amanita phalloides, better known as the death-cap mushroom, which grow around the trunk after hornbeams mature. When ingested, death-cap mushrooms can cause extreme medical conditions and death. Death-cap mushrooms can be mistaken for other edible mushrooms (Amanita princeps).

== Cultivation and uses ==
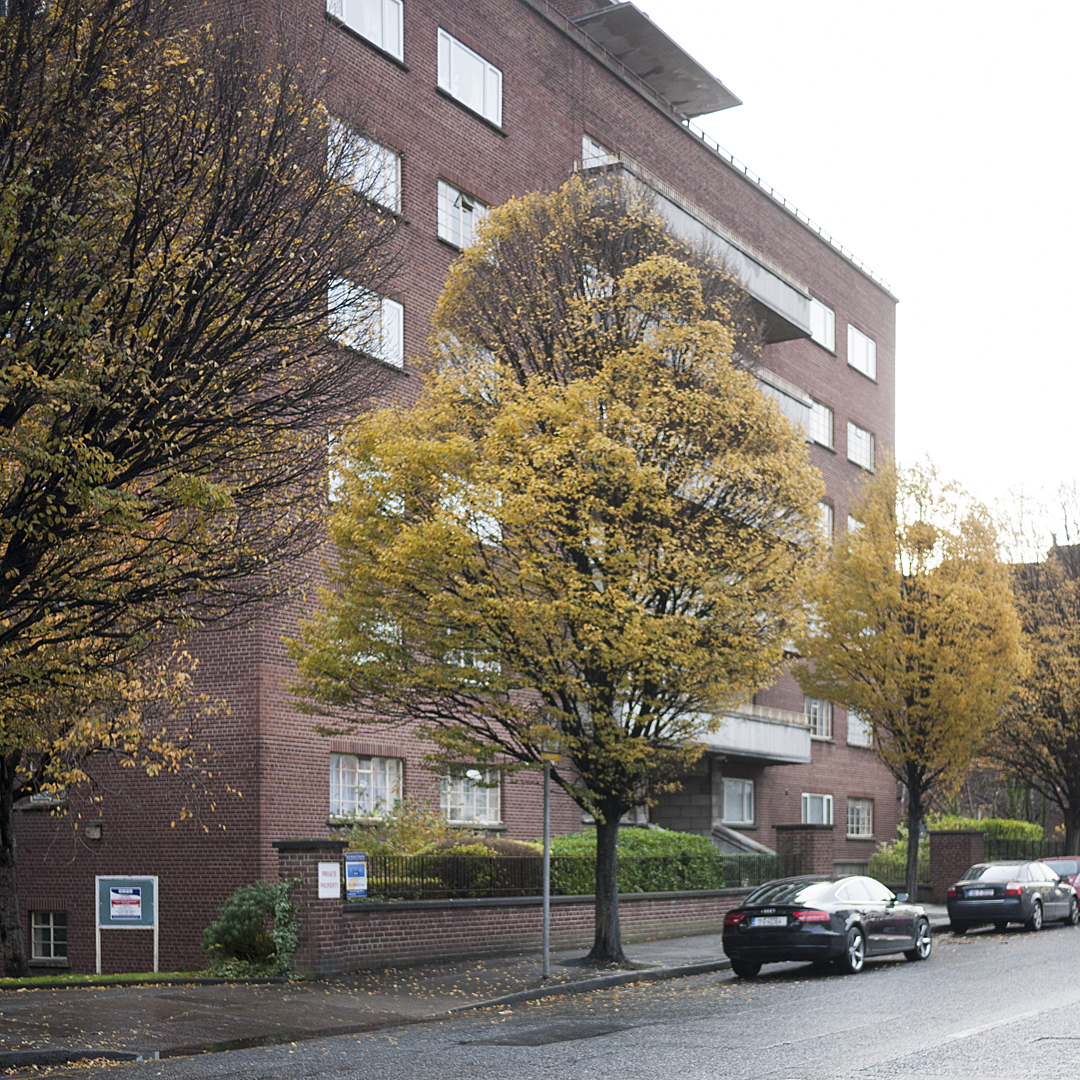
Carpinus betulus 'Fastigiata' in Dublin, Ireland where it is a common street tree

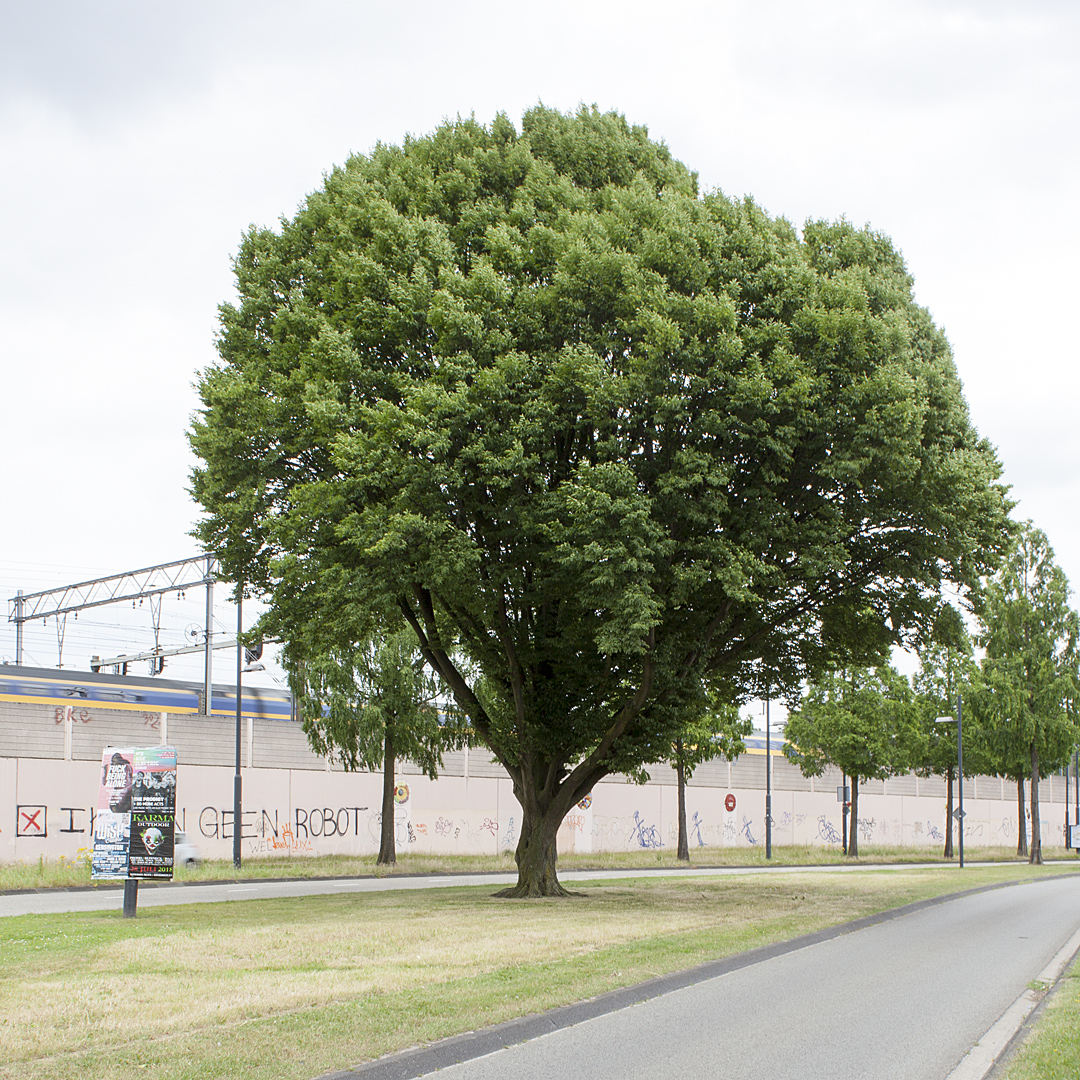
Mature Carpinus betulus 'Fastigiata' in Eindhoven, Netherlands

Carpinus betulus is widely cultivated as an ornamental tree, for planting in gardens and parks throughout north west Europe. Because it stands up well to cutting back and has dense foliage, it has been much used in landscape gardening, mainly as tall hedges and for topiary. It was the classic tree used in French formal gardens for hedges in bosquets, as in the Gardens of Versailles, and in their English equivalent, the garden wilderness.

There are several cultivars, notably 'Fastigiata' or 'Pyramidalis', a fastigiate tree when young, which has become a popular urban street tree in the United Kingdom and other countries. 'Frans Fontaine' is a similar fastigiate cultivar. Both the species C. betulus and the cultivar 'Fastigiata' have gained the Royal Horticultural Society's Award of Garden Merit.

As early as Roman times, but also during the Thirty Years' War, defensive hedges (Landwehr) in Central Europe were largely planted from hornbeams. The bushes were chopped down with axes and broken down. The trees would then grow together with blackberries, dog roses, and other thorny bushes into impenetrable hedges. In the 11th century, for example, the Electorate of Mainz set up a large defensive forest called the Rheingauer Gebück. Many place names with the endings -hagen and -hain refer to such landwehrs.

Hildegard of Bingen wrote of hornbeam being used as a plant in traditional medicine to treat vitiligo. The heated hornbeam chips were pressed onto the affected skin areas. Hornbeam is used in Bach flower remedies as a treatment for exhaustion.

The wood is heavy and hard, and is used for tools and building constructions. It also burns hot and slowly, making it very suitable for firewood. This was the reason for lopping and hence indirectly the saving of Epping Forest, where the hornbeam was a favoured pollarding tree. The wood has a very high calorific value of around 2.3 MWh/stere (28 million BTU/cord).

== Notable examples ==
- The Last Tree - The only tree that survived the devastation of the Battle of Delville Wood in 1916. It is preserved as part of the Delville Wood South African National Memorial near Longueval.
- Lincoln's Hornbeam - Planted by President Lincoln at the United States Botanic Garden in the Capitol grounds, Washington D.C.

== Gallery ==
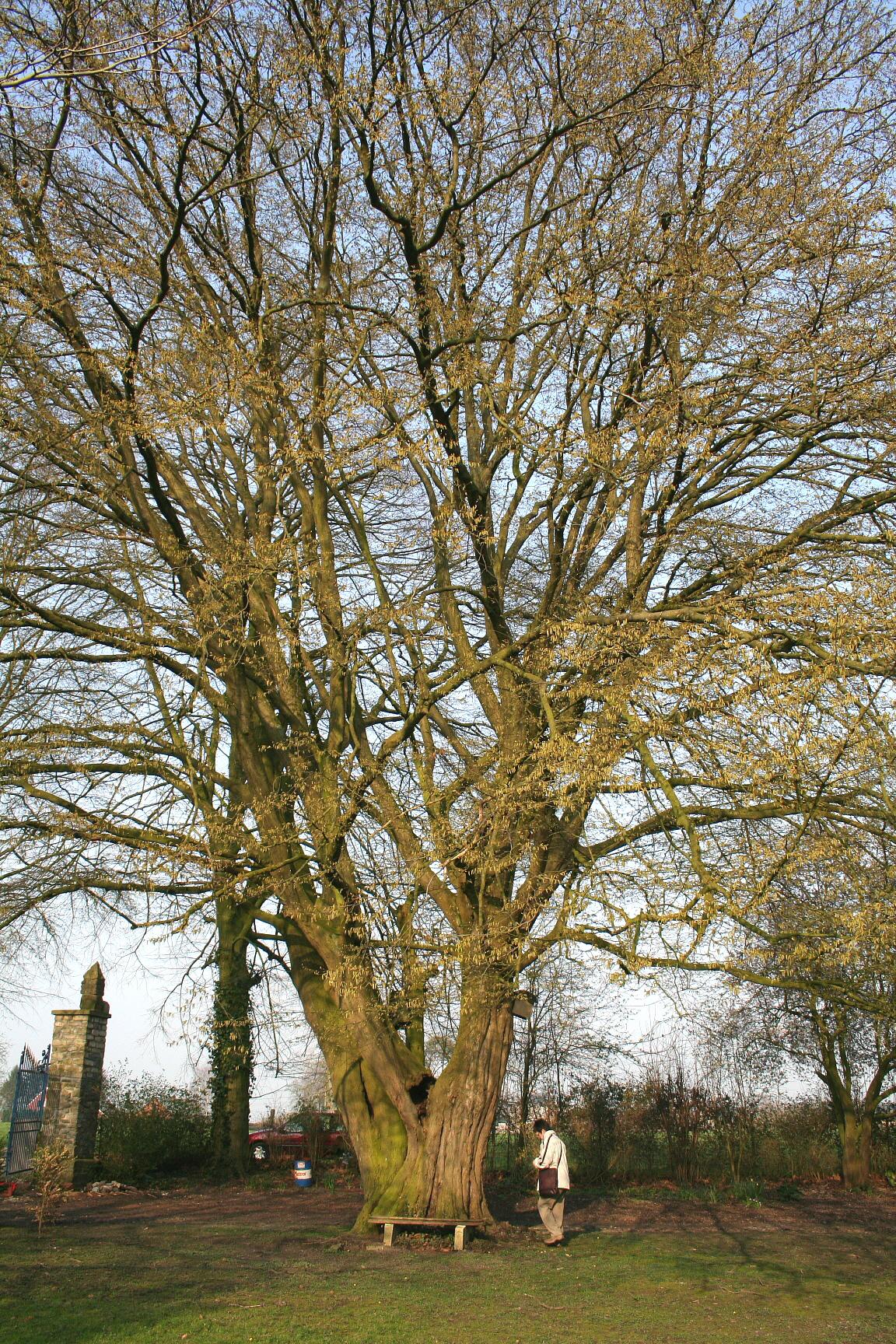
Tree in winter

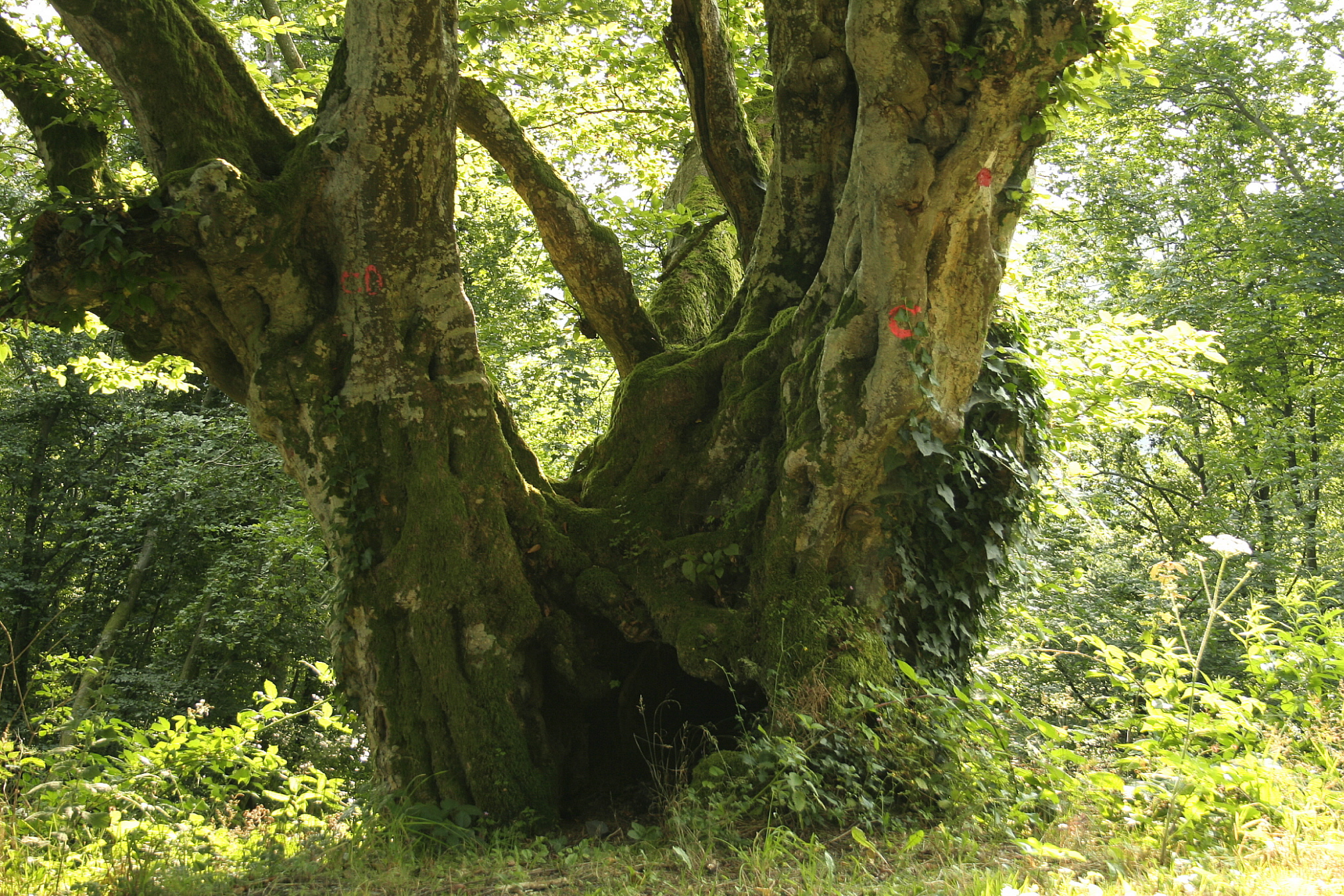
Old tree

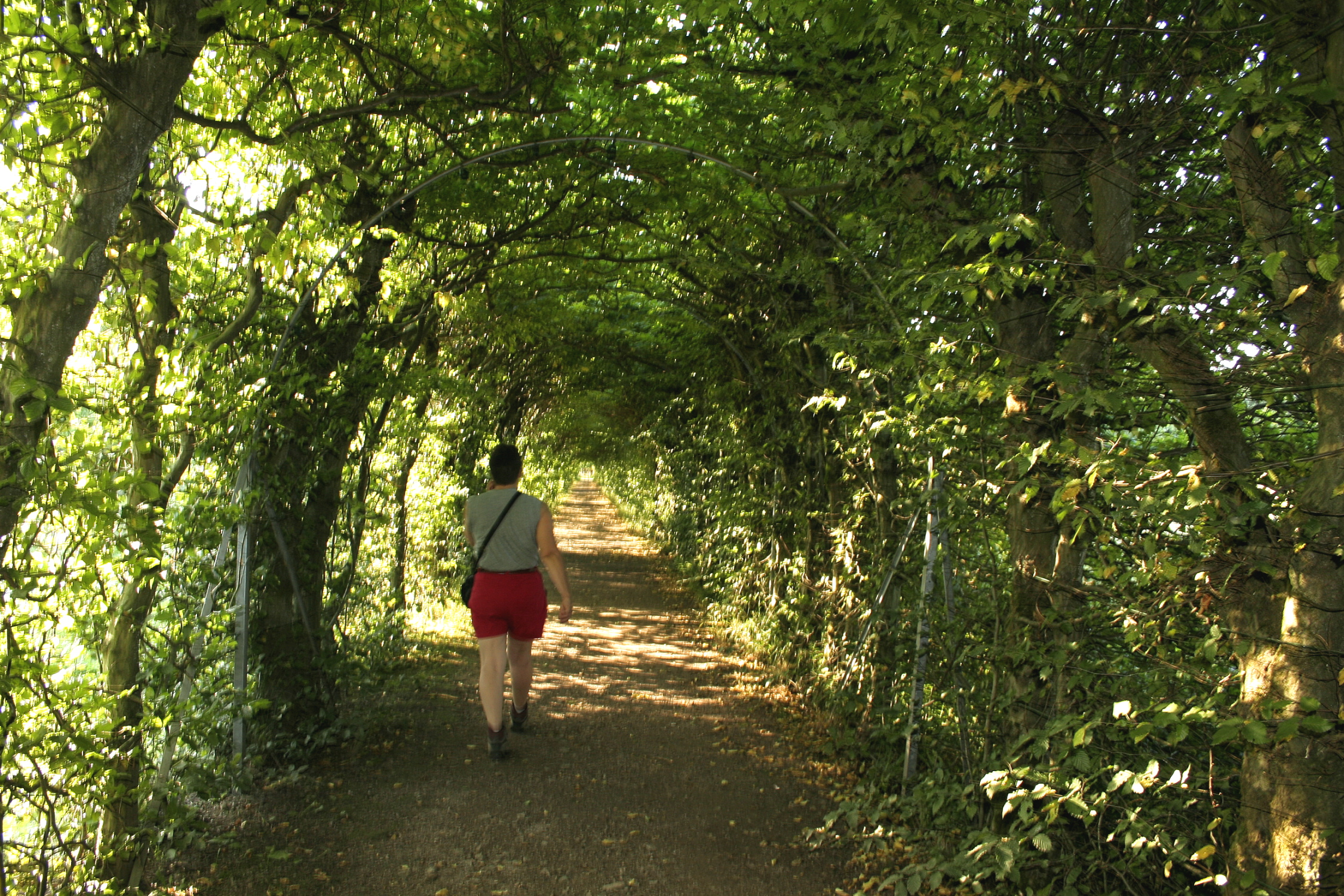
Hornbeam-covered walk

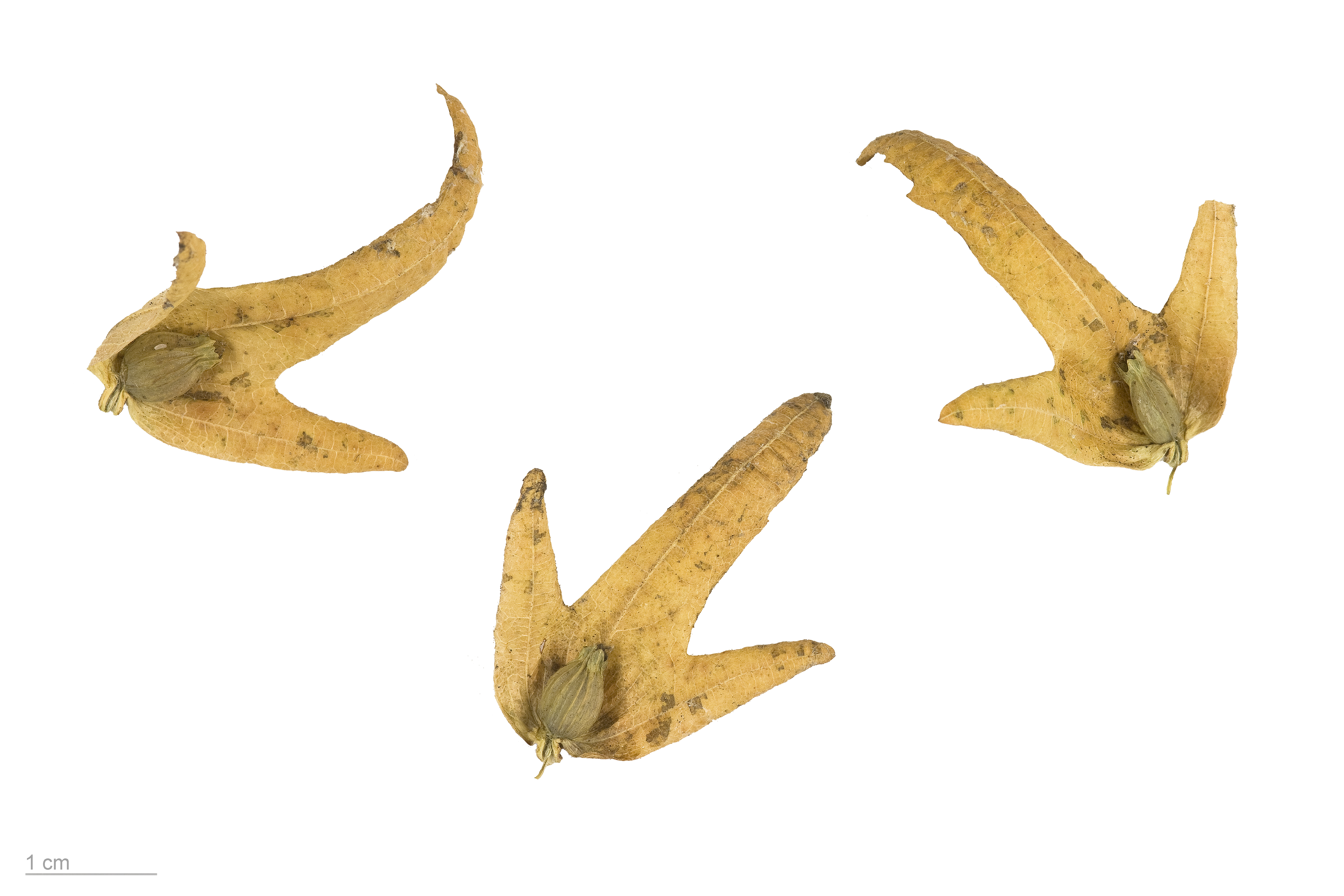
Fruit and seeds

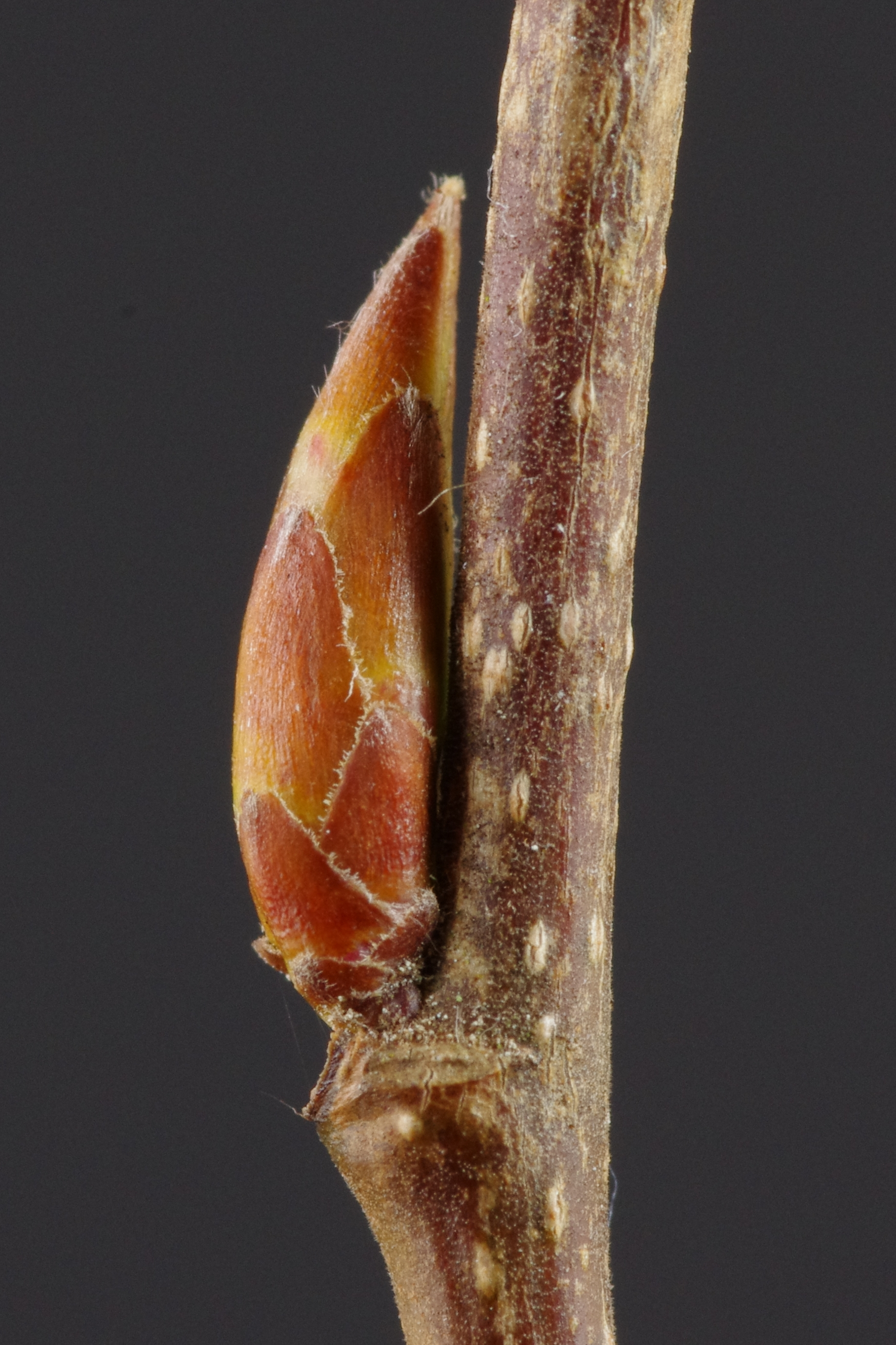
Leaf bud

Catkins

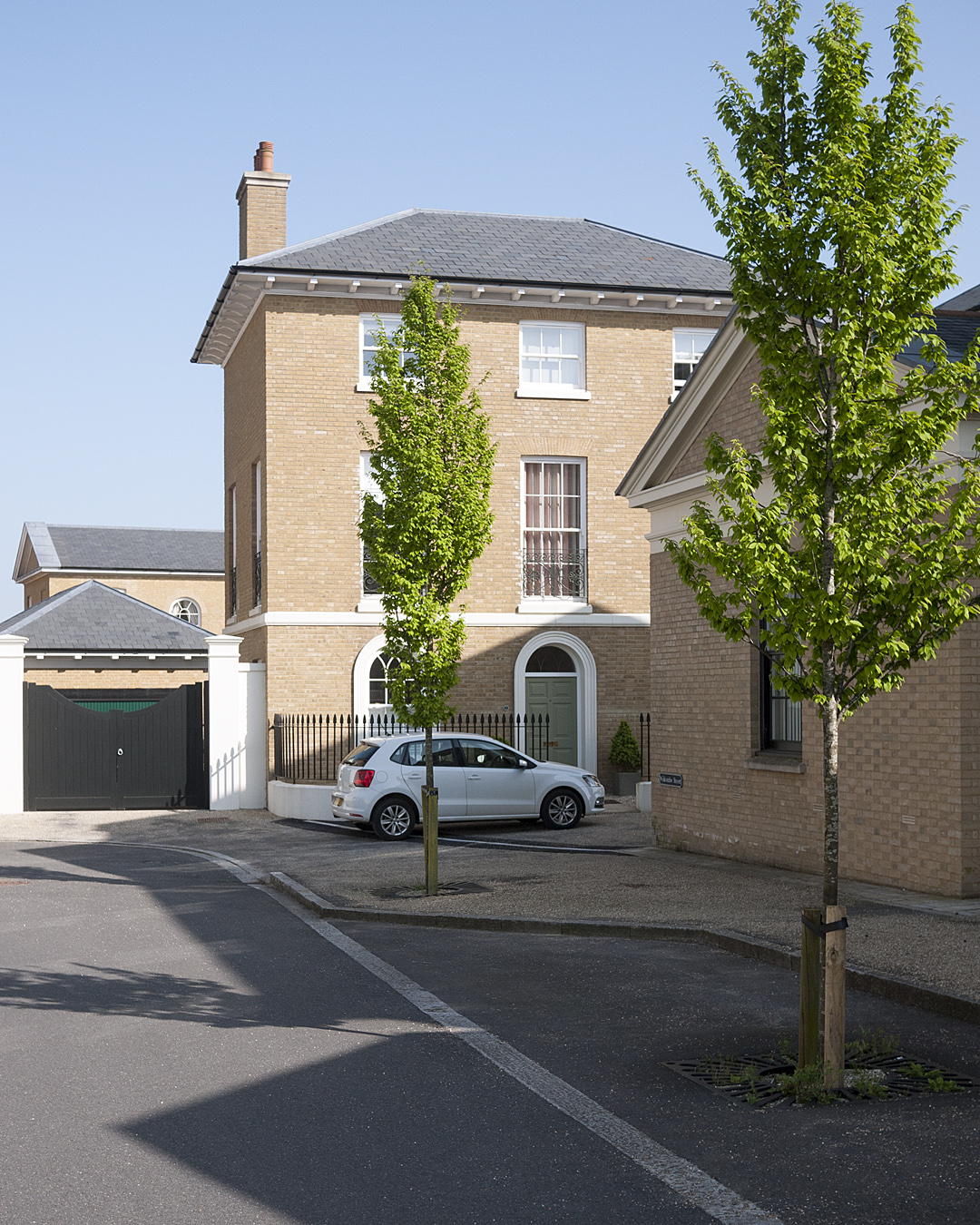
Newly planted Carpinus betulus 'Fastigiata' in Poundbury, Dorset, United Kingdom

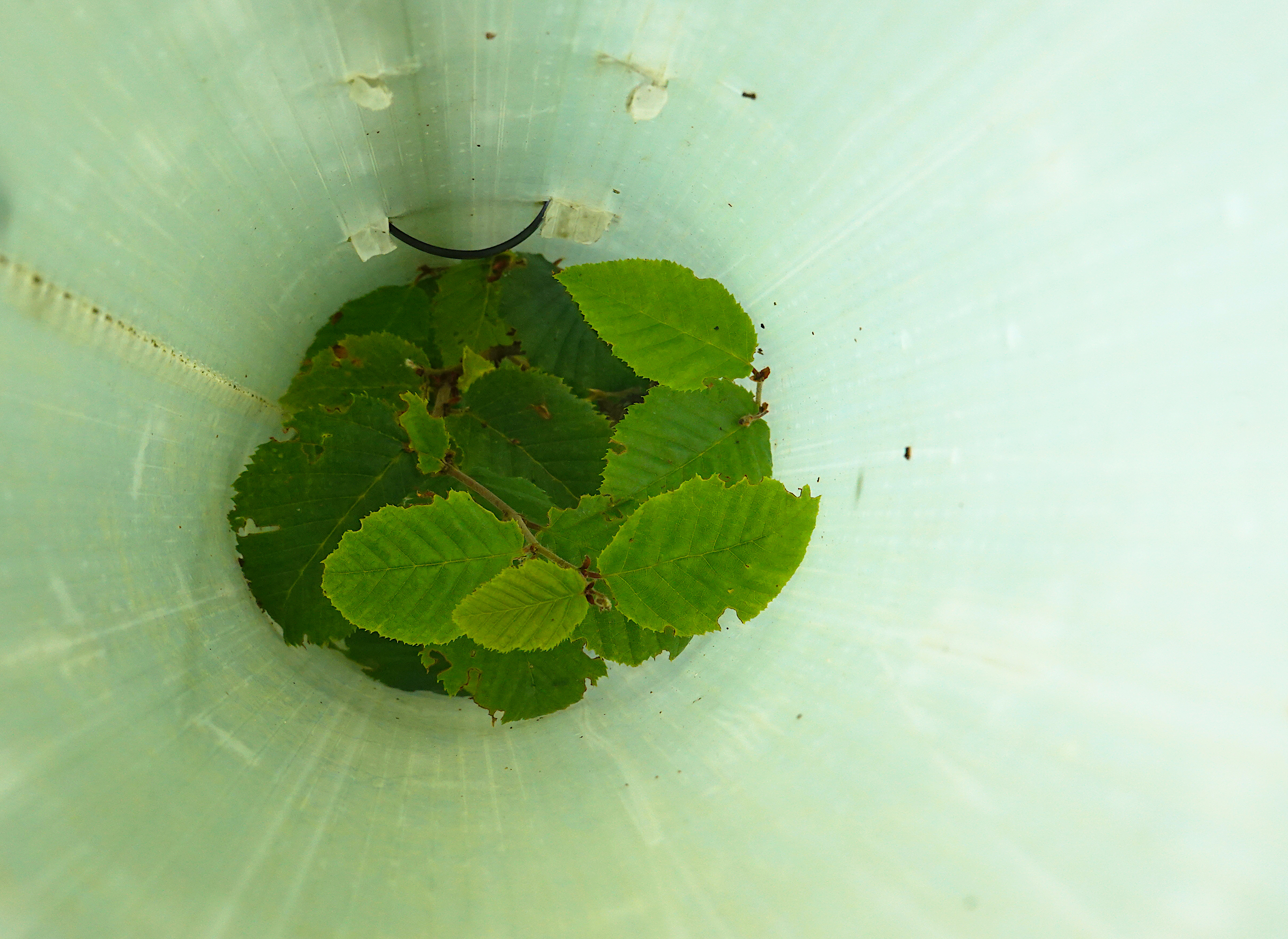
Common hornbeam in a tree protection tube planted 3 years and 3 months earlier

Emerging leaves

Logs, showing a cross section of the wood
