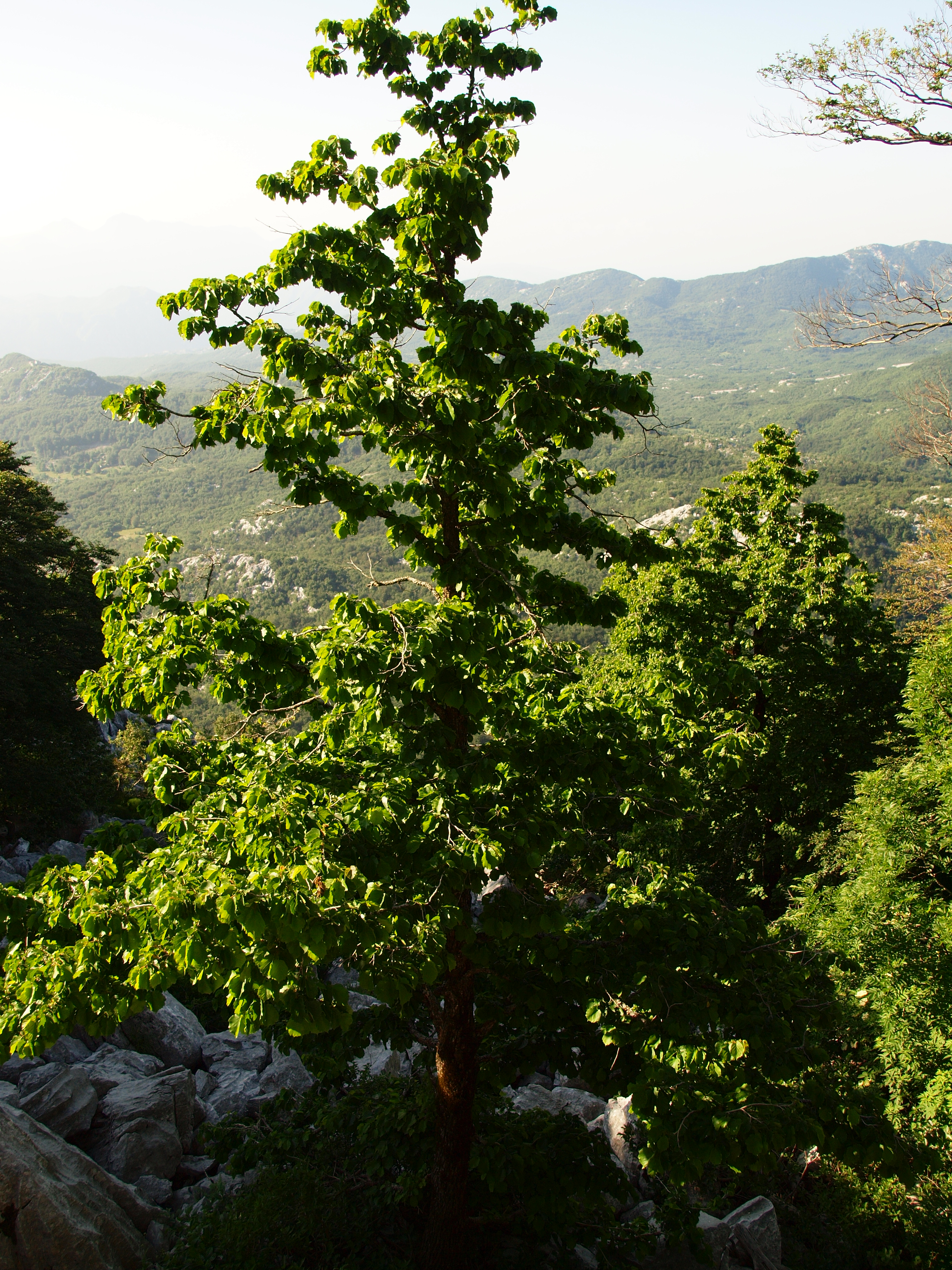
- Turkish hazel on Orjen, Bosnia and Herzegovina

Conservation status
- Least Concern (IUCN 3.1)

Scientific classification
- Kingdom: Plantae
- Clade: Tracheophytes
- Clade: Angiosperms
- Clade: Eudicots
- Clade: Rosids
- Order: Fagales
- Family: Betulaceae
- Genus: Corylus
- Species: C. colurna

Binomial name
- Corylus colurna L.

Synonyms
- 21 synonyms: Corylus abchasica Kem.-Nath. (1978); Corylus arborescens Münchh. (1768); Corylus avellana f. glomerata (Aiton) W.T.Aiton (1789); Corylus avellana var. glomerata Aiton (1813); Corylus avellana var. macrochlamys Spach (1841); Corylus bizantina Desf. (1815); Corylus cervorum Petrov (1936); Corylus colurna var. avellanoides Spach (1841); Corylus colurna var. bachycarpa Spach (1841); Corylus colurna var. glandulifera A.DC. (1864); Corylus colurna var. leptochlamys Spach (1841); Corylus colurna var. macrochlamys Spach (1841); Corylus colurna var. trichochlamys Spach (1841); Corylus eggrissiensis Kem.-Nath. (1978); Corylus egrissiensis Kem.-Nath. (1978); Corylus glomerata (Aiton) Nois. (1825); Corylus iberica Wittm. ex Kem.-Nath. (1938); Corylus iberica var. glandulosa Kem.-Nath. (1938); Corylus kachetica Kem.-Nath. (1978); Corylus macedonica V.Cordus & Gesner ex Strelin (1788); Corylus nana Tourrette & Rozier (1787)

= Corylus colurna =

Species of tree native to Europe and Asia

Corylus colurna, the Turkish hazel, Byzantine hazel or Constantinople Hazel, is a species of hazel (Corylus) in the birch family (Betulaceae). It is native to the Balkan Peninsula and Western Asia, but has become widely introduced in other areas of Europe as an ornamental, particularly as a street tree. It typically grows 25–30 metres (82–98 ft) tall, with a slender growth form in its youth. Although the nuts are not commercially important, Corylus colurna is commonly used as a single-stemmed, non-suckering rootstock for common hazel (Corylus avellana) scions.

== Taxonomy ==
The genus Corylus is classified in the family Betulaceae, subfamily Coryloideae, and is most closely related to Ostryopsis, Carpinus, and Ostrya. It is distributed in Europe, Western Asia, East Asia and North America, with 16 accepted species (as of August 2026).

Corylus colurna was among the 7,300 species described by Carl Linnaeus in his 1753 Species Plantarum. The species epiphet — colurna — refers to a Latin word for a hazelnut with valuable wood. Within the genus, C. colurna is classified in the section Colurnae, together with other tree hazels (C. chinensis, C. fargesii, C. jacquemontii).

== Description ==
It is a large species of hazel, reaching 25 m (82 ft) tall, exceptionally to 33 m (108 ft) tall, with a stout trunk up to 1 m (3 ft) in diameter, rarely to 1.6 m (5 ft). The crown is slender and conical in young trees, becoming broader and irregular with age. The bark is pale grey-buff, with a thick, corky texture. On young trees, the main limbs are quite small in diameter in relationship to the straight trunk, and arise at almost a 90-degree angle. This makes the tree suitable for urban conditions and helps maintain a symmetrical crown which is popular with landscape architects.

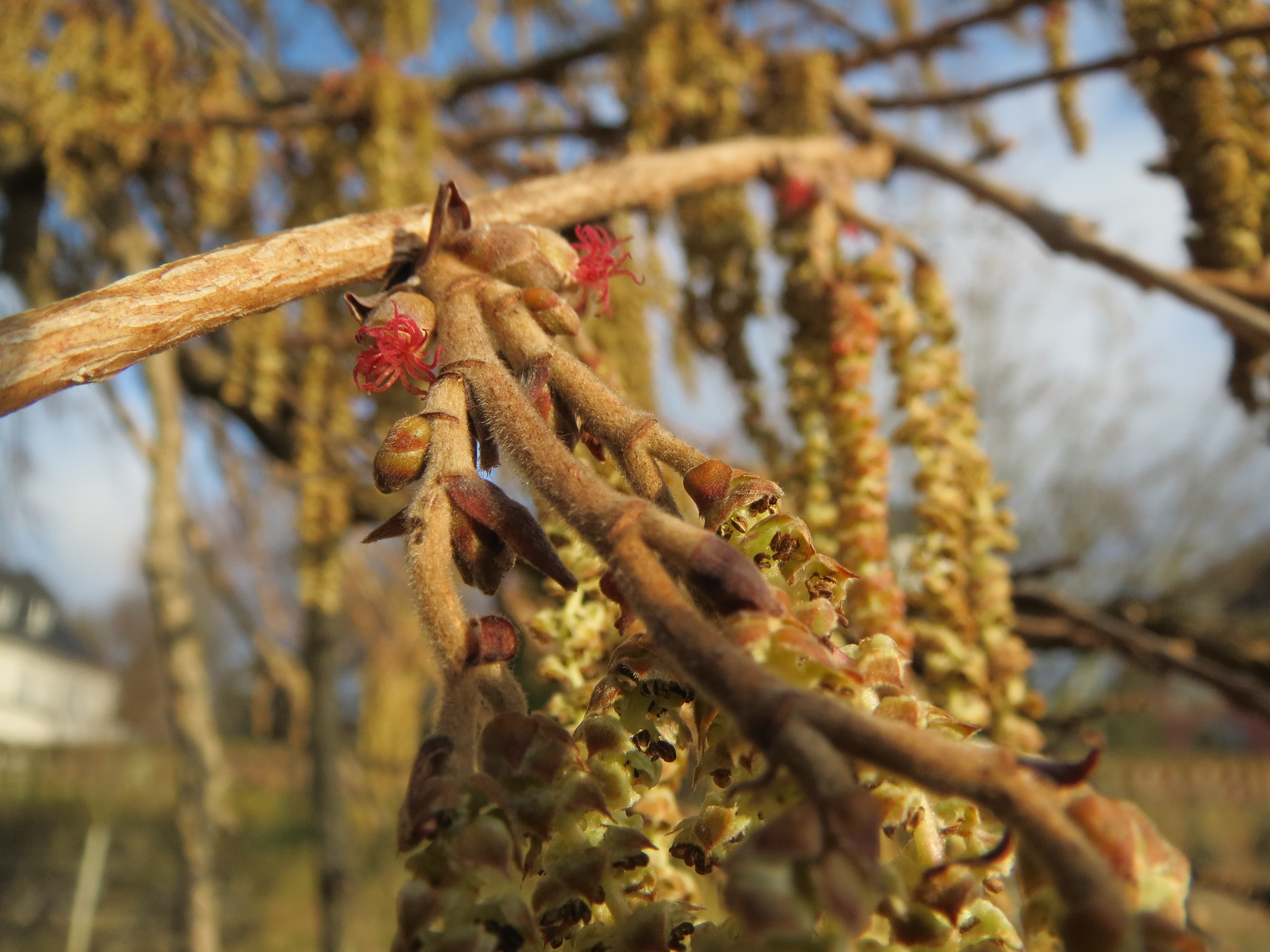
Twig in January with male (yellowish-brown) and female (red) catkins

The leaves are deciduous, rounded, 7–13 centimetres (2.8–5.1 in) long and 6–14 cm (2.4–5.5 in) across, softly hairy on both surfaces, and with a coarsely double-serrate to shallowly lobed margin. The buds are ovoid, pale brown. The flowers are produced in late winter or early spring before the leaves; the species is monoecious, with the individual catkins single-sex, but both sexes on the same tree (and often on the same twig); the male catkins are conspicuous, pale yellow and 5–10 cm long, the female very small and inconspicuous, largely concealed in the buds, with only the bright red 1–3 mm long styles visible.

The fruit is a nut and may be known as the Turkish hazel nut, Turkish nut, or Constantinople nut. It is about 1–2 cm long, surrounded by a thick, softly spiny and bristly involucre (husk) 3 cm diameter, which encloses all but the tip of the nut; the nuts are borne in tight clusters of 3–8 together, with the involucres fused at the base. The fruit matures in September to October and is edible. Its taste is very similar to common hazel, but it is smaller and has a thicker nut shell. They are occasionally gathered from the wild as well as from urban trees, but their small size (smaller than common hazel nuts) and very hard, thick nut shell (3 mm thick) makes them of little or no commercial value. Corylus colurna is however important in commercial hazelnut orchards, as it does not sucker, making it the ideal rootstock on which to graft the nut-bearing common hazel cultivars. Nut production is irregular and occurs every two to three years

=== Root ===
Corylus colurna has fibrous roots. The roots are not adventitious, meaning they do not form suckers. This makes C. colurna desirable for grafting on the rootstock over a single stemmed trees. This allows it to be grown in poorer and rocky soils.

== Distribution and habitat ==
C. colurna is native to southeast Europe and southwest Asia, from the southern Balkans through northern Anatolia to the Caucasus. Although it has been reported from the mountain forests of northern Iran (Hyrcania and Turan) in the past, more recent surveys have failed to relocate it here, casting doubt over its continued presence in the region. Previously, the species was also considered to be native to the western Himalayas, but these populations are currently considered as constituting a different, though closely related species, C. jacquemontii.

Corylus colurna occurs scattered in the mountains of the southern Balkans, the Pontic Alps of northern Anatolia, the Armenian Highlands, and the Caucasus. Although generally uncommon, it can be locally abundant in suitable sites. C. colurna occurs in a wide altitudinal range between 100 (in the Balkans) and 1,700 m (in the Caucasus) (330-5,680 ft), mostly on shallow, nutrient-poor lime soils. At lower altitudes, it constitutes a member thermophilous oak forests alongside, for example, Hungarian oak (Quercus frainetto), Oriental hornbeam (Carpinus orientalis), and flowering ash (Fraxinus ornus), whereas at higher elevations, it occurs together with beech (Fagus sylvatica, F. orientalis) and sycamore maple (Acer pseudoplatanus). It is light-demanding and relatively uncompetitive, becoming dominant only in very dry sites.

In the Balkans, C. colurna is primarily distributed south of the Danube; the northernmost autochthonous stand grows in the southern Carpathians of Romania, close to the Iron Gates. It is also found in the Balkan, Sredna Gora and Rhodope Mountains of Bulgaria, the Pindus of Greece and Albania, and the Orjen in Bosnia and Herzegovina, for example. In Anatolia, it occurs in a few scattered locations in the northwest and north (for example in Kastamonu). In the Caucasus, it is primarily distributed in Georgia, but is also found in Armenia, for example near Getahovit.

== Cultivation ==
Corylus colurna has a medium growth rate. It is occasionally drought tolerant and alkaline soil tolerant. However, it prefers moist, well-drained soil, as well as full sun. Once established C. colurna is tolerant of heat, cold, and drought. There are no serious pests or problems with C. colurna.

Corylus colurna is not easily transplantable and will need extra watering in summer after transplanting. It will take about two years after transplant for the tree to become established and survive on its own. Corylus colurna has received the Royal Horticultural Society's Award of Garden Merit.

=== Propagation ===
The most common form of propagation is by seed. It is best sown as soon as it is harvested in autumn in a cold frame. The seed will germinate in late winter or spring. If starting with a stored seed, the seed should be pre-soaked in warm water for 48 hours and then given 2 weeks warm followed by 3 to 4 months cold stratification. This will allow the seed to germinate in 1 to 6 months if kept at 20 °C. Once the seedlings are large enough to handle, pick the seedlings out into individual pots and grow them on in a cold frame or sheltered place outdoors for their first winter. The seedlings can be planted into their permanent positions in late spring or early summer.

== Uses ==
Besides its use as a single-stem rootstock for C. avellana, C. colurna is widely cultivated as an ornamental tree in Europe and North America. It is very tolerant of difficult growing conditions in urban situations, which in recent decades has increased its popularity in civic planting schemes. Turkish hazel makes a good shade tree since it produces dense shade, and its narrow crown and ability to withstand air pollution make it well suited for use as a street tree in urban areas, or a specimen tree in parks. It makes a rather formal statement in the landscape due to the tight, consistently-shaped, narrow crown. Other landscape uses for C. colurna are for fruit, difficult and dry sites, and naturalistic areas.

== Gallery ==
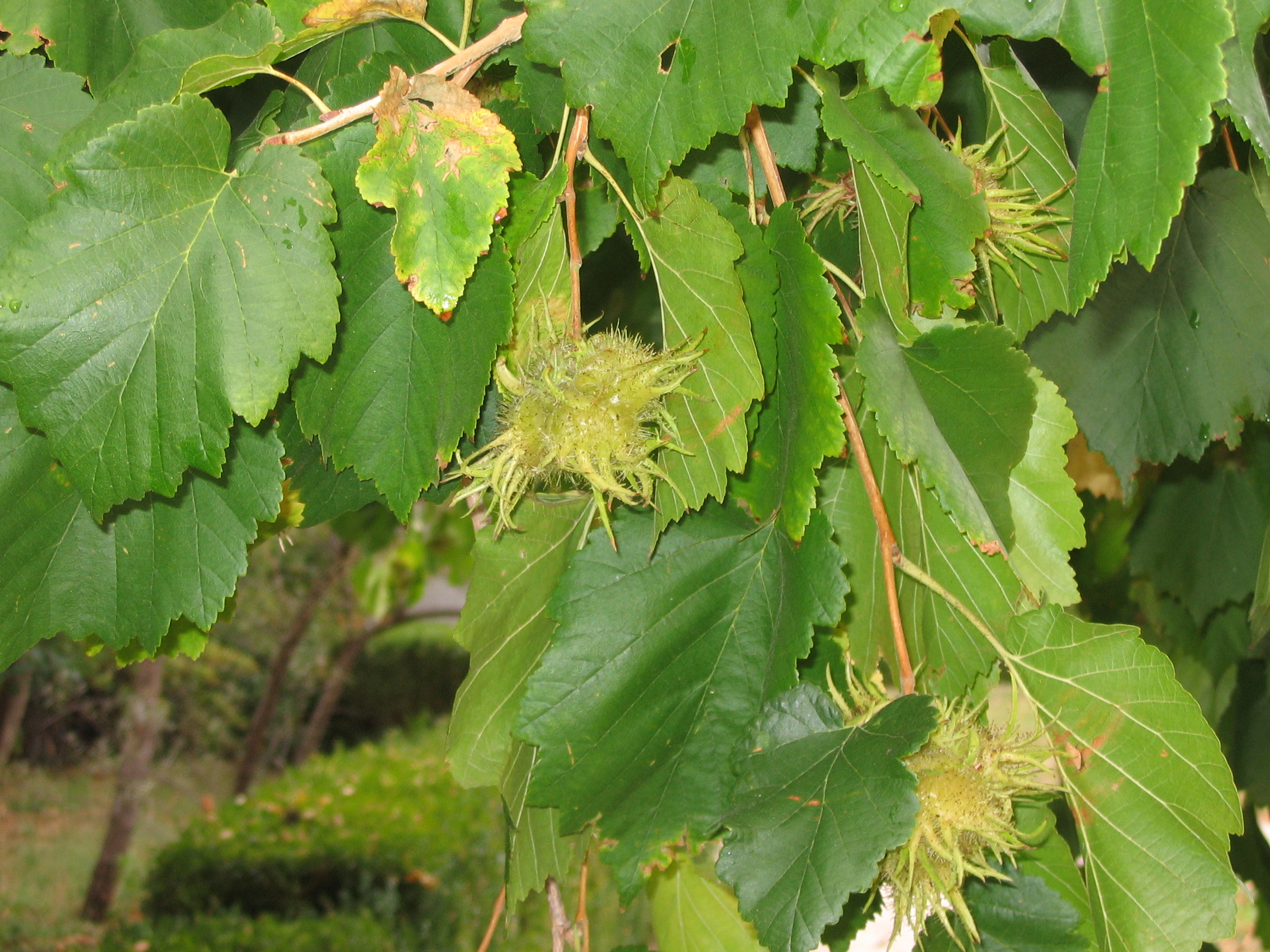
Foliage and immature fruit
Turkish hazel tree, on Ady Endre street from Bóly, Hungary.
Turkish hazel, foliage. Location: Bóly, Hungary

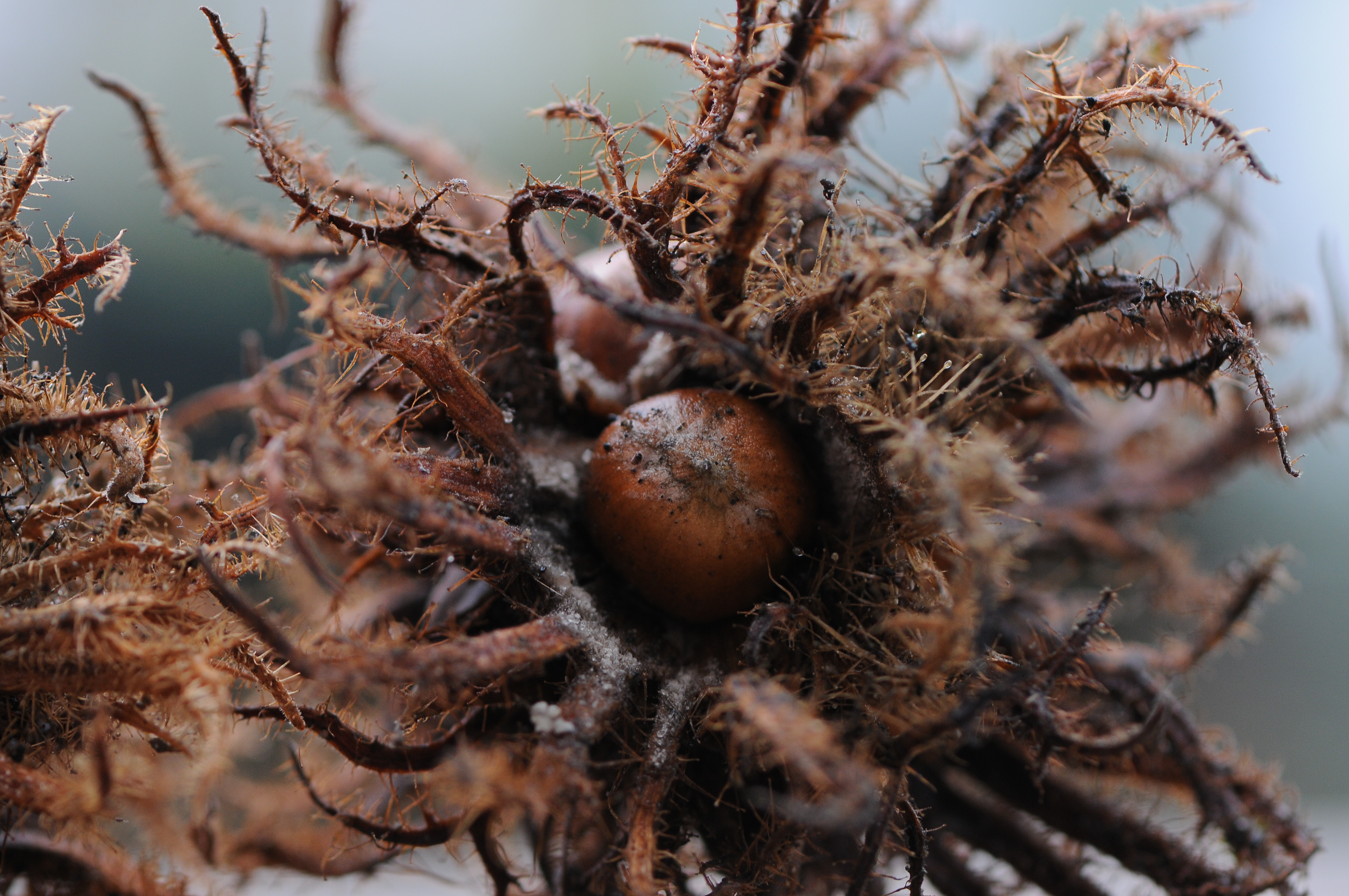
Involucre with ripe nut

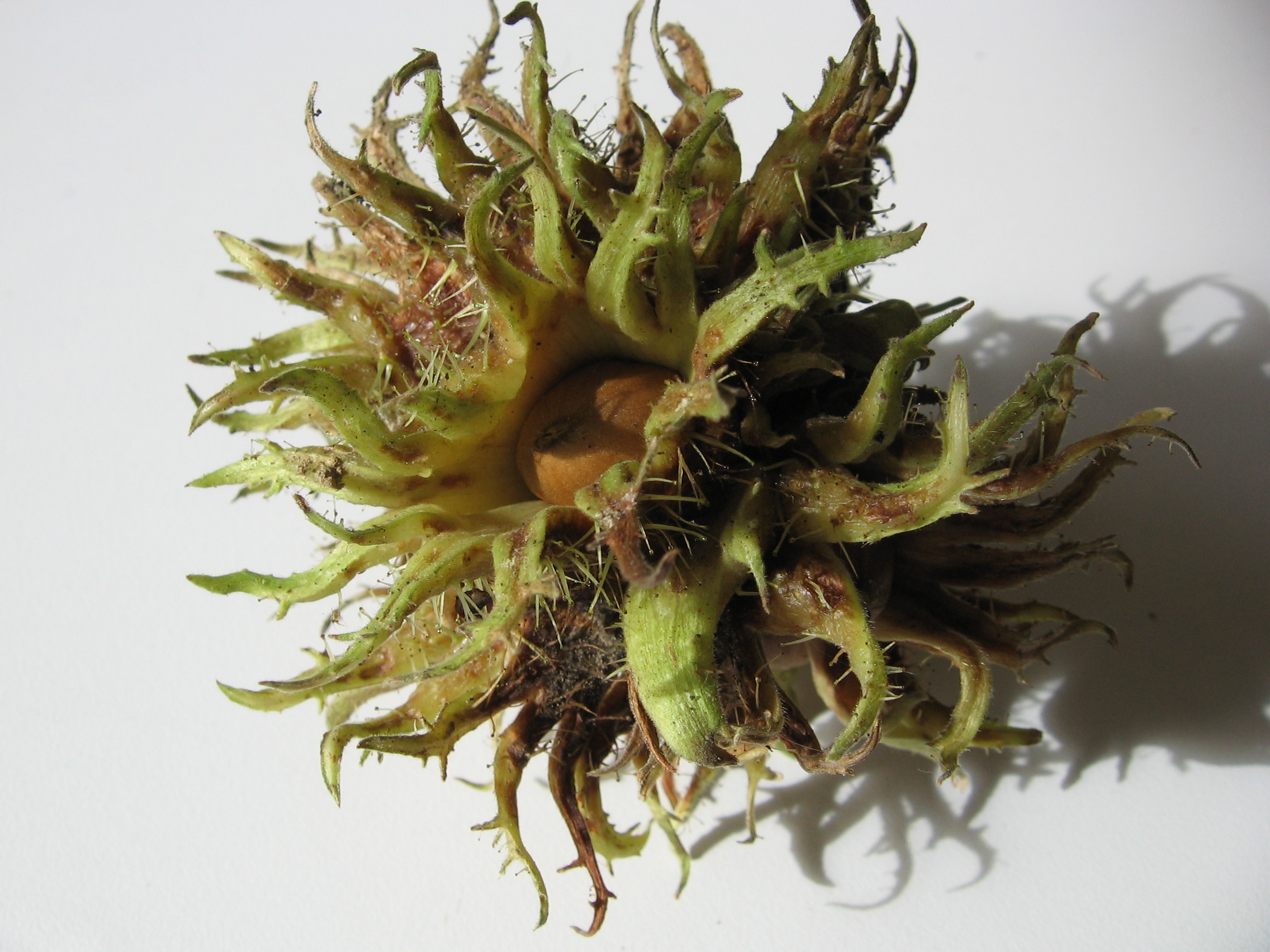
Bristly involucre

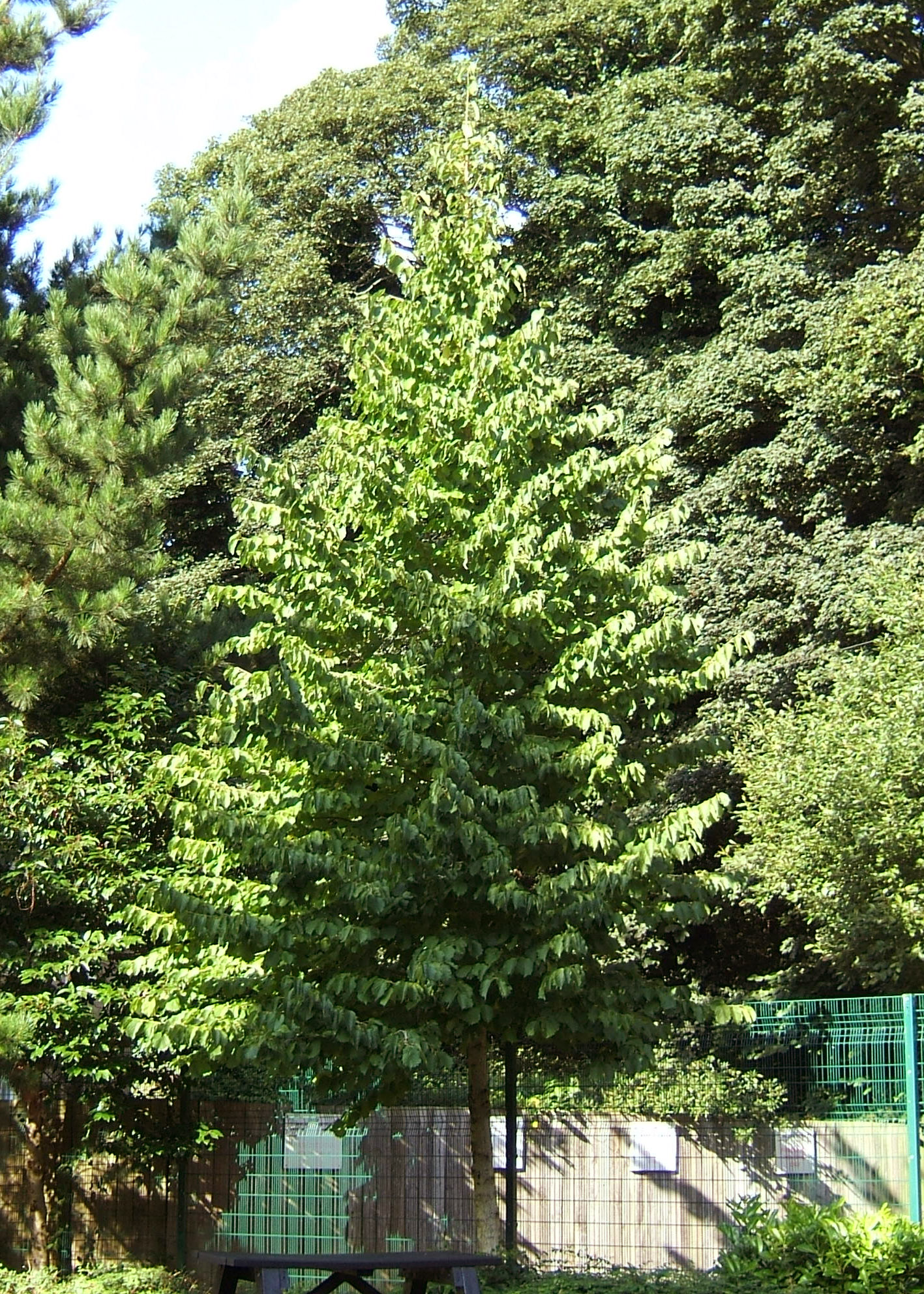
A young Turkish hazel showing the narrow conical crown

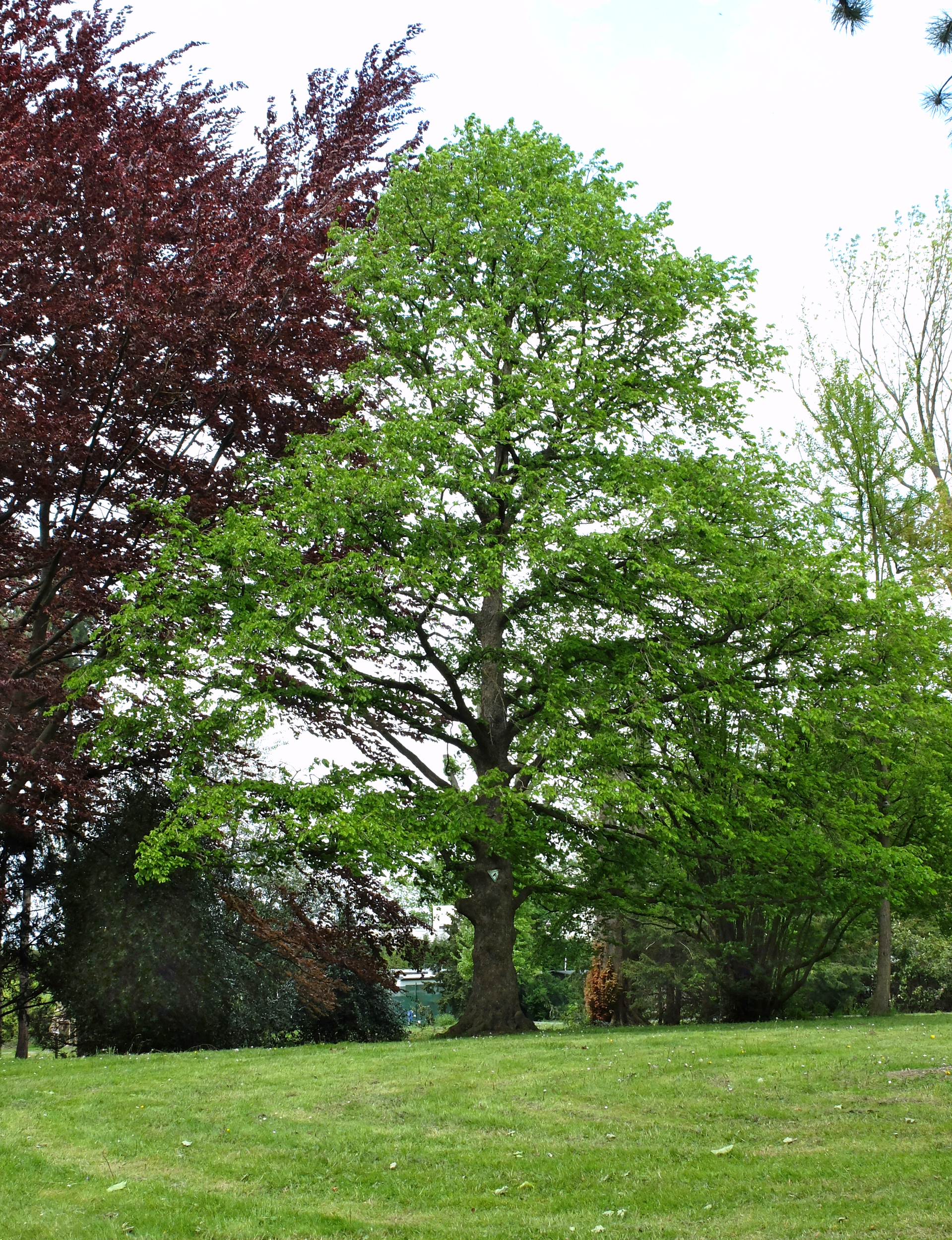
Older specimens become broader, but often retain a good shape

== Related species ==
Similar species Corylus jacquemontii, once considered as a variety of Coryllus colurna, is found growing wild in the forests of Western Himalayan range in the north Indian state of Himachal Pradesh particularly in the temperate regions of districts of Kullu, Shimla, Kinnaur district and Chamba district.
