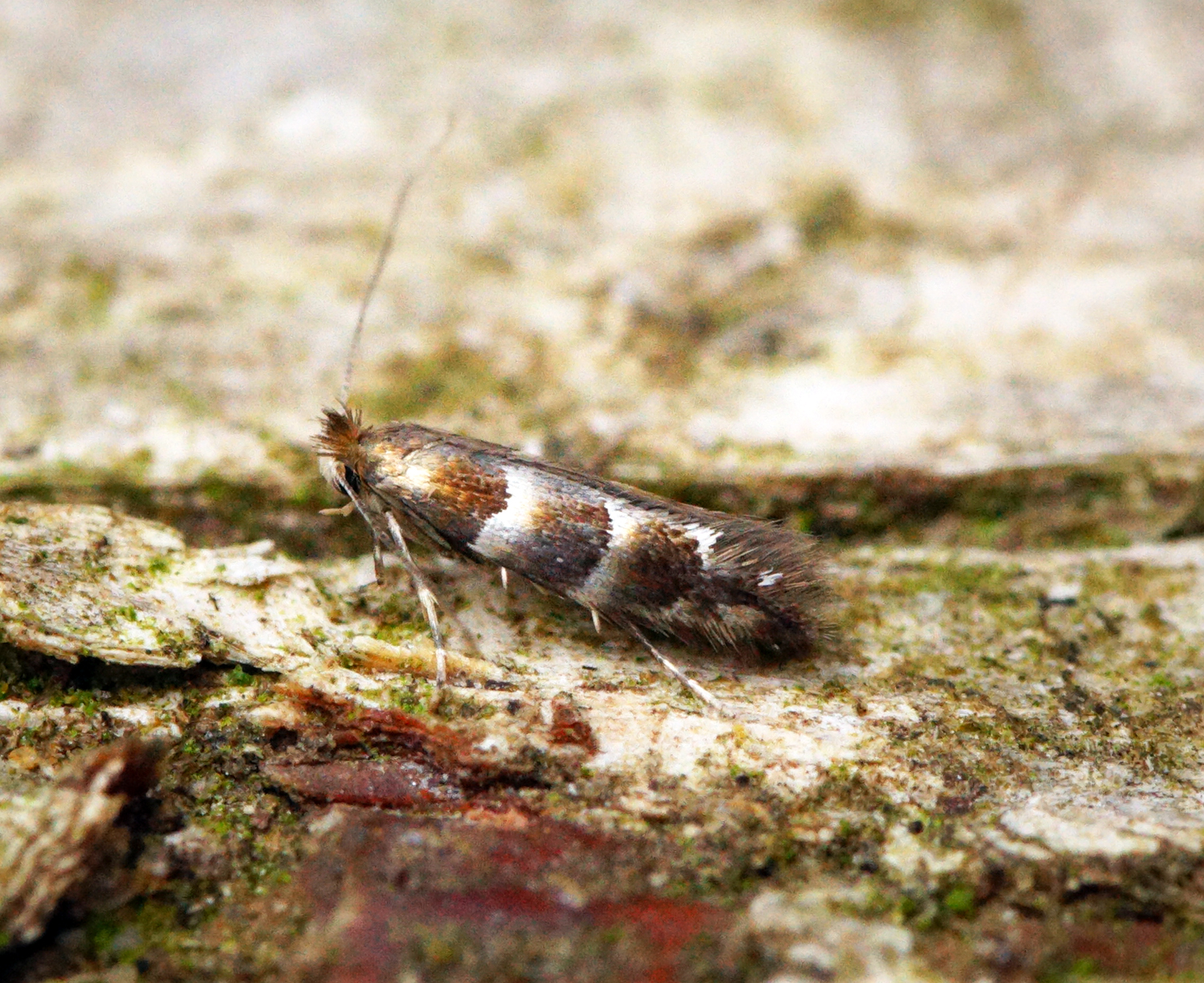

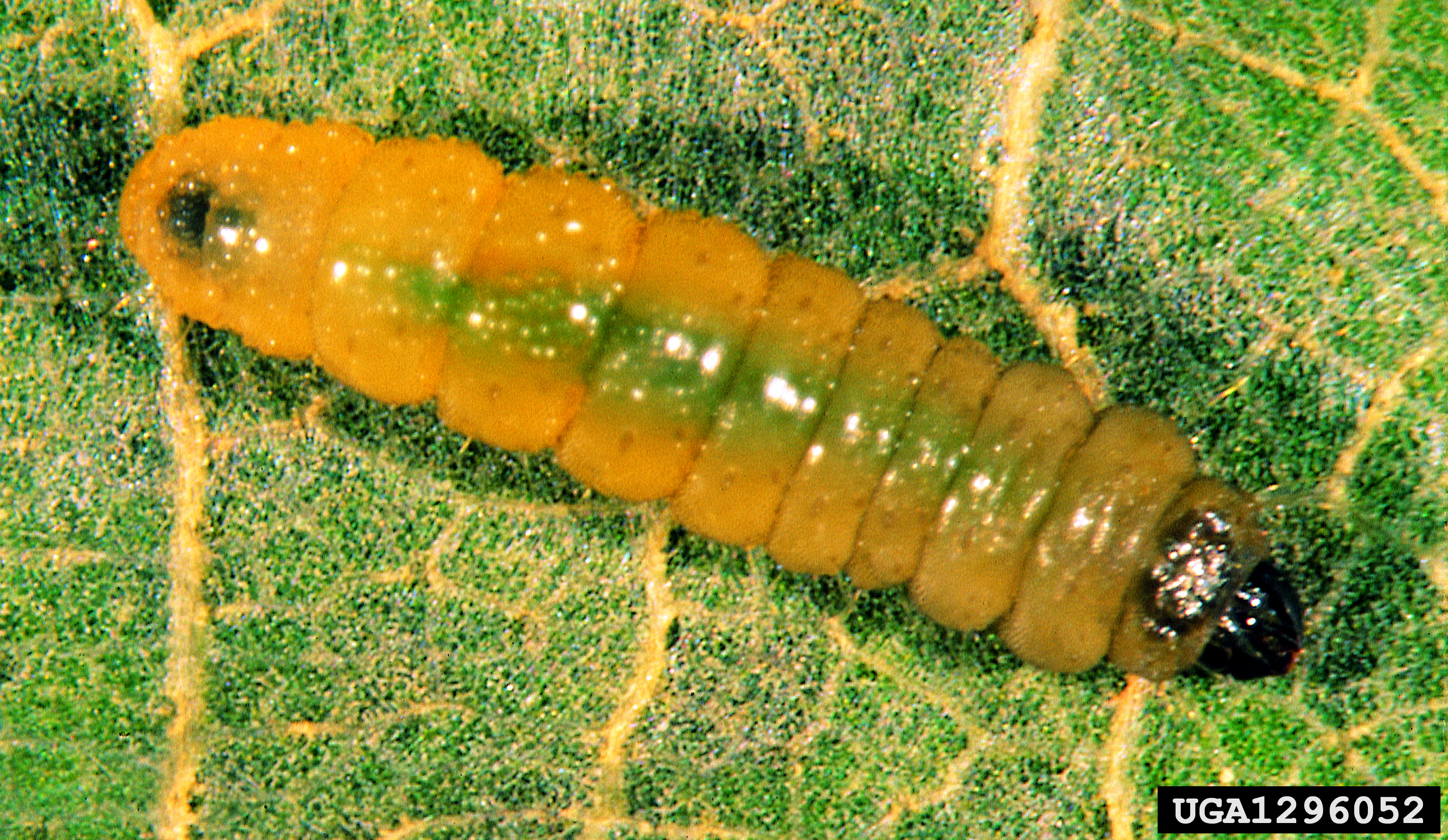

Scientific classification
- Domain: Eukaryota
- Kingdom: Animalia
- Phylum: Arthropoda
- Class: Insecta
- Order: Lepidoptera
- Family: Gracillariidae
- Genus: Phyllonorycter
- Species: P. nicellii

Binomial name
- Phyllonorycter nicellii (Stainton, 1851)

Synonyms
- Lithocolletis nicellii Stainton, 1851

= Phyllonorycter nicellii =

Species of moth

Phyllonorycter nicellii is a moth of the family Gracillariidae. It is found in most of Europe, except the Balkan Peninsula and the Mediterranean islands.

== Description ==
The wingspan is 7–8 mm The forewings are shining golden-ochreous, sometimes suffused with brown; base pale; a fascia at 1/4, another in middle, three posterior costal and two dorsal wedge-shaped spots shining whitish, anteriorly blackish-margined, first pair of spots often connected; an oval blackish apical spot. Hindwings are grey. It is very similar to Phyllonorycter froelichiella qv.

== Biology ==
The larvae feed on Corylus avellana and Corylus colurna mining the leaves of the host.

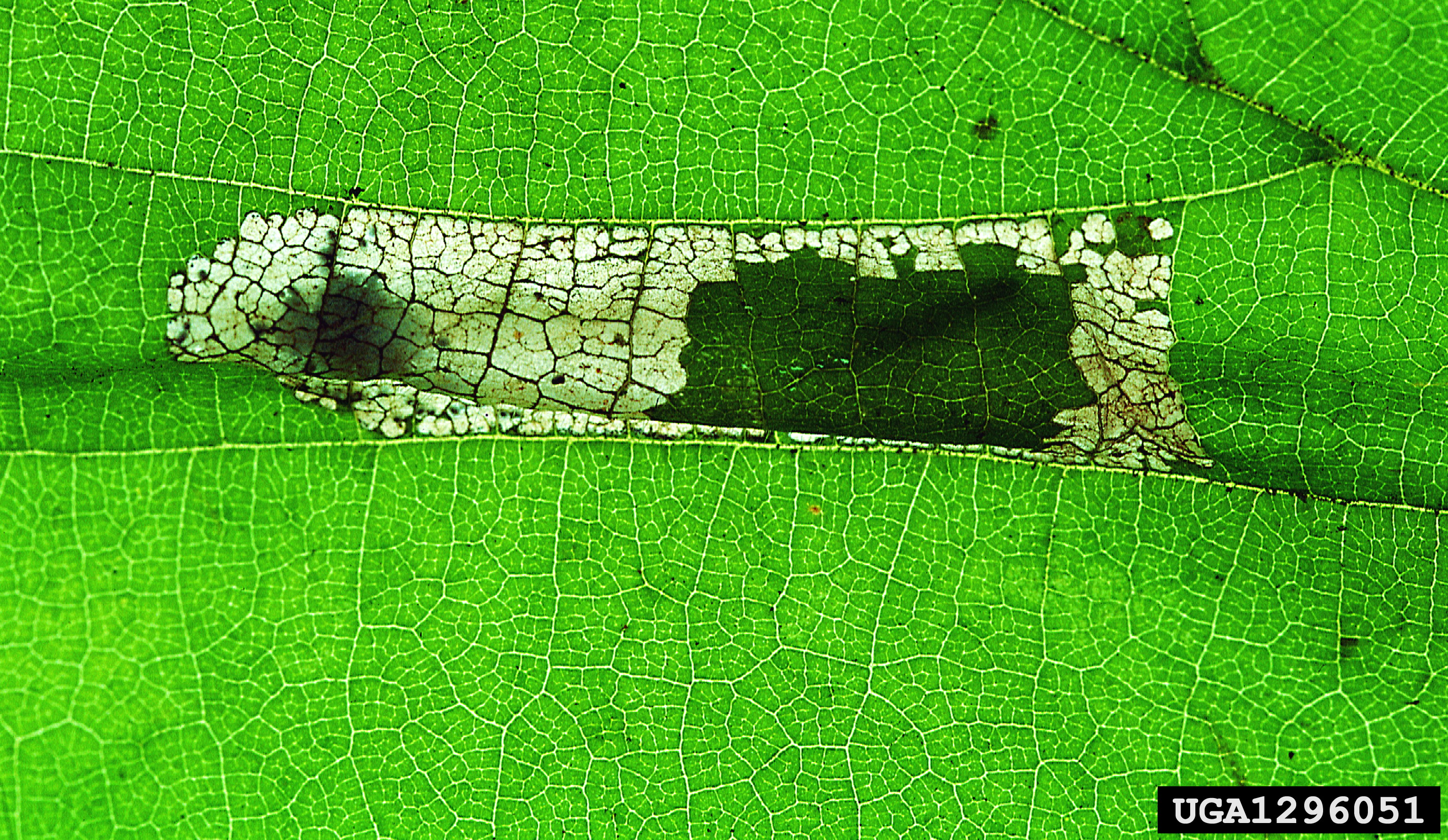
Leaf mine

The moths are on wing in May and August in two generations.
