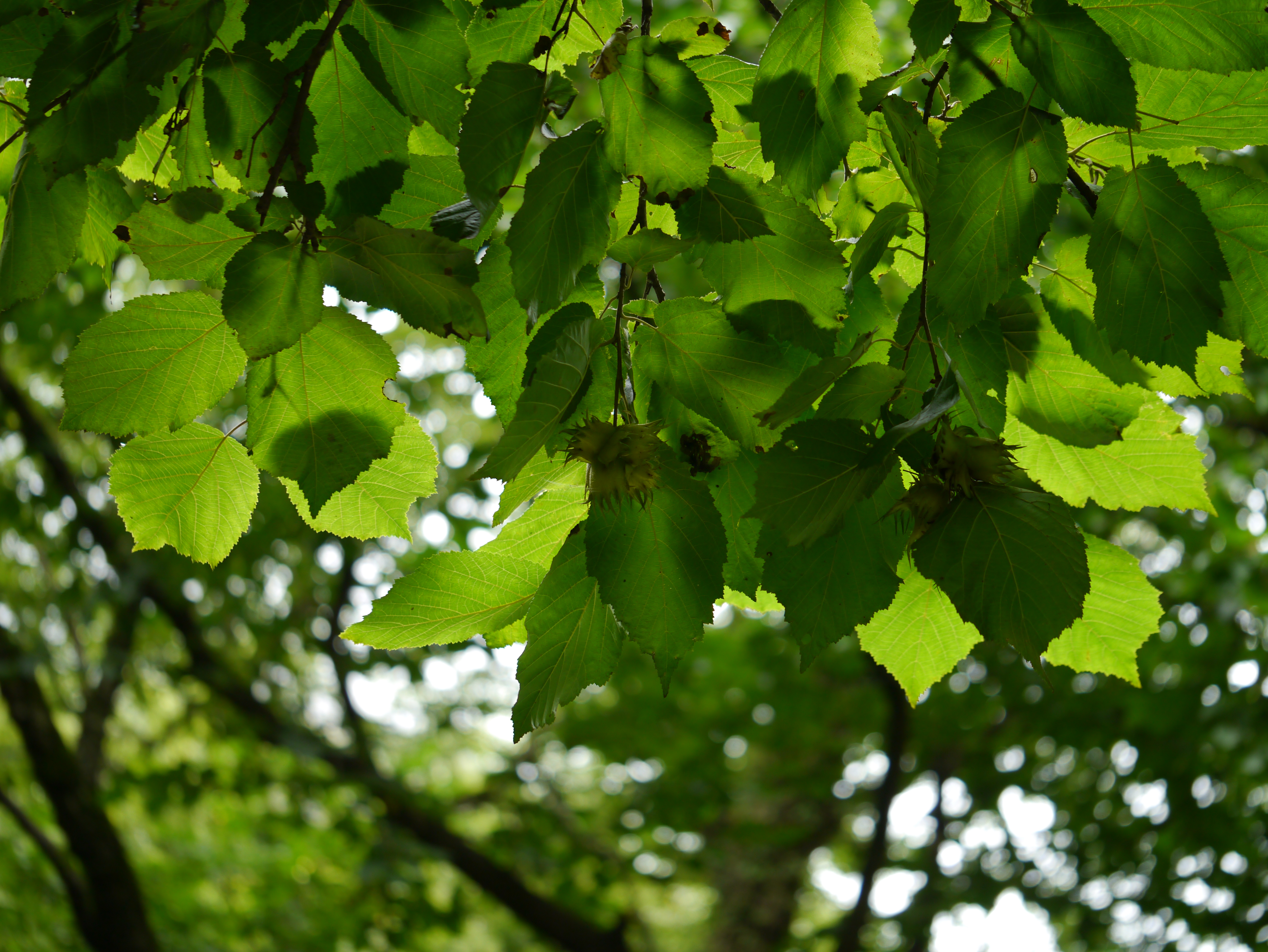

Conservation status
- Data Deficient (IUCN 3.1)

Scientific classification
- Kingdom: Plantae
- Clade: Embryophytes
- Clade: Tracheophytes
- Clade: Angiosperms
- Clade: Eudicots
- Clade: Rosids
- Order: Fagales
- Family: Betulaceae
- Genus: Corylus
- Species: C. jacquemontii

Binomial name
- Corylus jacquemontii Decne.

Synonyms
- Corylus colurna var. lacera A.DC.; Corylus lacera Wall. [Invalid]; Corylus tiliacea Decne.

= Corylus jacquemontii =

Species of tree

Corylus jacquemontii (Jacquemont's hazelnut or Indian tree hazel) is a species of hazel, found in Asia, within the Himalayas and from Afghanistan through to W. Nepal. It is a small tree or shrub, with grey bark, ovate or obovate (teardrop-shaped) leaves, small flowers and small edible nuts, grouped in small clusters.

It has been used in many ways, not only as fuel source, fodder (for livestock) and timber but the trees also yield edible nuts for human consumption or for folk medicine uses.

== Description ==
Corylus jacquemontii is a medium-sized, upright growing, deciduous tree. It grows up to 15–25 m (49.2–82.0 ft) tall.

It has pale grey, or dark grey bark, which has deep vertical cracks that can help it be separated into small cork-like plates.

The young twigs of the Corylus are yellowish-grey, rather sparsely pubescent (covered with short, soft hairs) and with longer, glandular hairs later in life.

It flowers in India, between March and April. Elsewhere, it flowers between April and May. They are very, small flowers, in male catkins which are 2–4 cm (0.8–1.6 in) long and also female spikes, and they appear before the leaves.

It has 6–15 cm (2.4–5.9 in) long and 5–12 cm (2.0–4.7 in) wide leaves, which are broadly ovate, or obovate (teardrop-shaped), with the tip of the leaf acuminate (tapering to a long point). They have double-toothed margins and are glabrous above (smooth) and pubescent under the veins below. They have a short petiole (leaf stalk), 12–25 mm (0.5–1.0 in) long. They are alternate spaced.

It produces a seed capsule in a nut form, between September and October. They are produced in groups of 2–3, they are globose (rounded), and 12–16 mm (0.5–0.6 in) wide, with a thick shell. The nutshell provides an average of 40% of a nut's total weight, and the remaining 60% constitutes the nut itself. The nut sits in a structure called a ‘cupule’, or called husk (around the shells), are leathery, hairy and bell-like, covered with fine pubescent hairs and up 40 mm (1.6 in) wide. The husks are fringed with many jagged, (narrow and linear) lobes. The husk is spiny and has green maturing to deep brown shaded bracteoles (flower-leaves). The nuts can be easily separated from the husk.

Corylus jacquemontii generally resembles the Turkish tree Hazel (Corylus colurna), but C. jacquemontii is a smaller tree, has thinner bark, larger leaves, is less glandular and has less fleshy husks, and also fewer nuts per cluster.

== Biochemistry ==
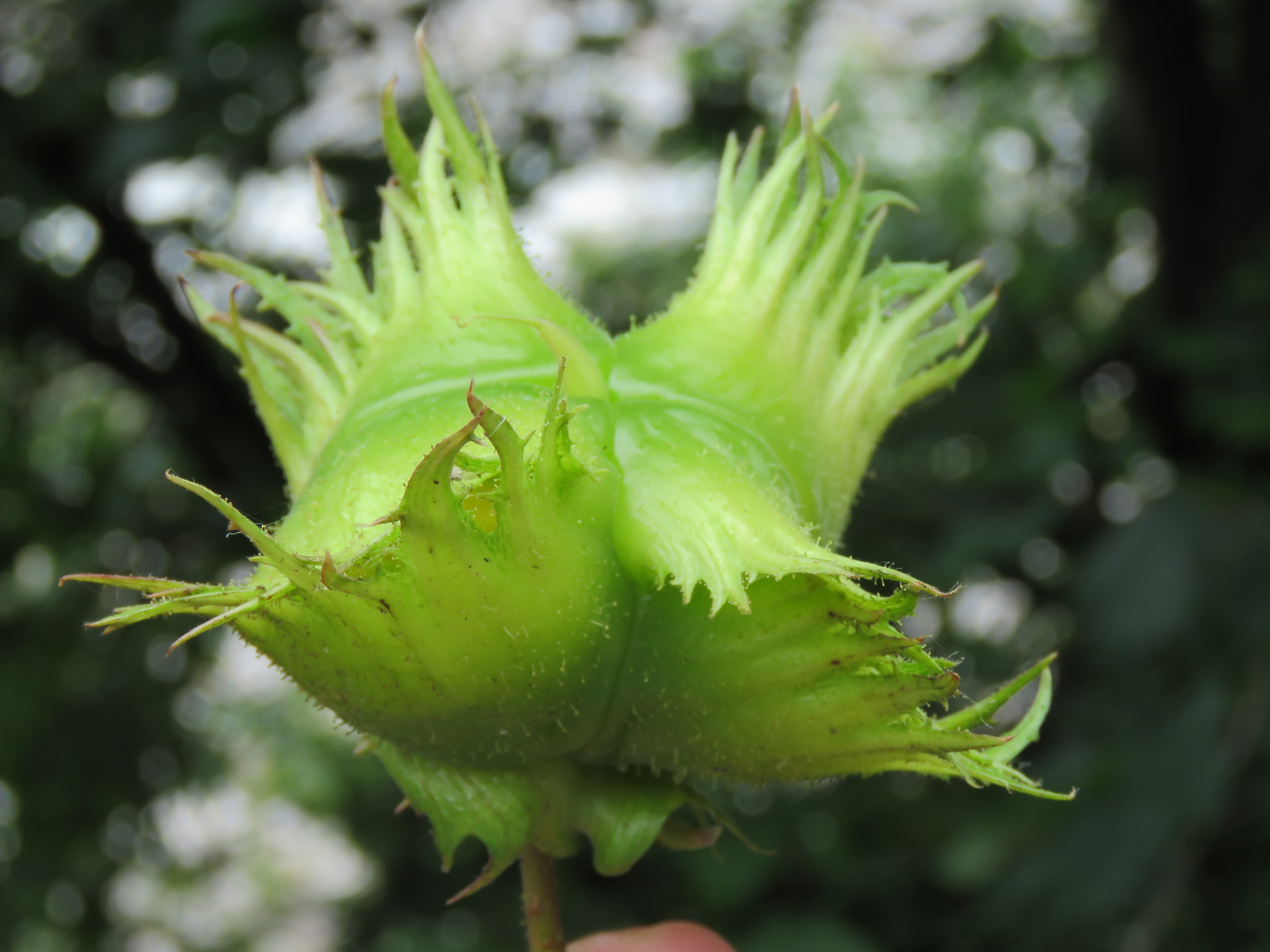
Corylus jacquemontii seed capsule in Valley of Flowers National Park, India

In 2003, the US Food and Drug Administration (FDA) recognized edible nuts as “heart healthy” foods. Frequent nut intake is associated with low risk of cardiovascular disease and cancer (Surh 2003; Hertog et al. 1993; Ness and Powles 1997). The prevalent phenolics accumulates in Corylus avellana kernels and its by-products are catechin, gallic acid, sinapic acid, caffeic acid, p-coumaric acid, ferulic acid, their esters and flavonoids.(Shahidi et al. 2007; Del Rio et al. 2011) Various other bioactive phenols have also been characterized in hazelnut leaves and foliar buds (Oliveira et al. 2007).

Seven polyphenolic compounds (gallic acid, catechin, epicatechin, quercetin, kaempferol, syringic acid and p-coumaric acid) have all been found in the nuts of Corylus jacquemontii.

Soxhlet extraction was used in 2022 to obtain different extracts (including petroleum ether and acetone) extracts from the nut.

== Taxonomy ==
It has the common name of Indian tree hazel, and it is also commonly known as 'Thangi' or 'Thankoli' in the western Himalaya. As well as 'Bhotiya Badam', 'Urmuni', 'Sharoli' and 'Sharod' by other Indian populations.

The Latin specific epithet jacquemontii refers to the French botanist and geologist Victor Jacquemont (1844–1912). As he had traveled in the Himalayas in 1830. He had local artists draw the tree, and one of those drawings was given to Indian forester Hugh Cleghorn in 1860.

It was first published and described by Joseph Decaisne in V. Jacquemont, Voyage dans l'Inde (Voy. Inde) vol.4 (Bot.), table 160 between 1835 and 1844.

Closely allied to C. colurna, and was once considered to be no more than a sub-species by some botanists, or a synonym, before being later accepted as a separate species. It was found that Corylus jacquemontii diverged from C. avellana about 4–6 Ma (million years ago) in the nrDNA trees.

It is an accepted name by the RHS, and it was also verified by United States Department of Agriculture and the Agricultural Research Service on 2 January 2003.

== Distribution and habitat ==
Corylus jacquemontii is native to temperate and tropical areas between Europe and Central Asia.

=== Range ===
It is found in western Asia within Afghanistan, tropical Asia within India (in the states of Himachal Pradesh, Jammu-Kashmir, Uttaranchal), the Himalayas, and also Nepal. Some sources also add Pakistan.

=== Habitat ===
It is grows in moist oak forests, and shrubberies, and it is found at altitudes between 1,800 and 3,000 m (5,900 and 9,800 ft) above sea level, in the upper montane zones.

== Uses ==
Corylus jacquemontii is used in many ways, not only as fuel (for house fires), fodder (for livestock) and timber (including logging,) but the trees also yield edible nuts for human as well as wildlife consumption.

The edible nuts, of C. jacquemontii and Corylus colurna are often consumed by local human populations. Such as the Himalayan tribes, (Pangwal and Bhot of Himachal Pradesh).

They are used either raw or cooked, and can be used with parched rice (dry roasted). Chauhan et al., (2014). An edible oil is also obtained from the seed. The nut is also used as a flavouring in various dishes.

In the 1860s, Indian forester Hugh Cleghorn, recorded that nuts from this species were sold in the bazaar in Shimla, Himachal Pradesh, India.

Also the wild animals; such as birds, insects, etc. also feed on the seeds of the species. After falling to the ground they can also eaten by small rodents like pica (such as Ochotona macrotis), flying squirrel, rats and even by the Himalayan brown bear (Ursus arctos isabellinus) as reported by Vaidya (2003).

The leaves and young shoots are lopped (down) for use as cattle fodder, and as a fuel source along with maple (Acer spp.) and kharsu oak (Quercus semecarpifolia) in the Western Himalaya.

It is used in folk medicine, such as a massage oil (made from the seed) of the species is used for relieving muscular pain.

Nut rinds are used as dye. An extract obtained from the buds, flowers, leaves, nuts and bark (of the tree) by isolation and purification technique, which can then be used to moisturize skin, and also can be used to mobilize fluid in skin tissue and drain the fluid from such tissues (which may reduce puffy eyes) when applied to the skin.

Seed oil extracts of C. jacquemontii has also been tested for in-vitro anti-fungal activity against fungal pathogens such as Aspergillus niger, Aspergillus fumigates and Penicillium marneffei, with positive results found.

== Cultivation ==
This species is cultivated for its edible seed in Asia, and then nuts are distributed worldwide, but mainly to countries such as Turkey, Italy, Spain, France, Greece, India, Iran, Azerbaijan and China.

It is generally an easily grown plant, as it succeeds in most soils, but is in general more productive of seeds/nuts when grown on soils of moderate fertility. As it does less well, in rich heavy soils or poor ones, It will grow well in a loamy soil. and is very suitable for alkaline soils, but it will not tolerate very acidic soils (a pH of below 7).

Corylus jacquemontii trees are also fairly wind tolerant, and like other members of this genus, they can withstand transplanting well and they can be easily moved even when relatively large trees.

They are cold hardy to USDA Hardiness Zone 5 (−20 °F to −10 °F).

The trees could be used within gardens as an ornamental shade tree.

Compatibility between Corylus jacquemontii, Corylus fargesii and Corylus ferrox have yet to be evaluated in hazelnut breeding programs. But it has potential as it is thought to have non-suckering rootstock.

It maybe susceptible to EFB (Eastern Filbert Blight) but it had not yet been fully researched. Although a study in 2015 in the Republic of Georgia found the Corylus jacquemontii was susceptible to blight.

Specimen trees have frequently set fruit (nuts) in Kew Gardens, UK.

=== Propagation ===
Corylus jacquemontiican be propagated by seed or by layering.

The seed (or nut) ripens in mid to late autumn and may need to be protected from squirrels (if they are around). If kept in a cool and dry place, and also not shelled, the seed should store for up to 12 months. For best results the seed should be sown as soon as it is harvested (from the tree) in autumn, and sown in a cold frame. The seed should germinate during late winter or spring.

If using stored seed, they should be pre-soaked in warm water for up to 48 hours and then given 2 weeks of warm followed by 3–4 months cold stratification, to break the embryonic dormancy phase. They should germinate between 1 and 6 months at 20 °C. When the seedlings are large enough to handle (when the first pair of true leaves appear), prick the seedlings out into individual pots and then grow them in a cold frame or in a sheltered place outdoors for their first winter. They can then be planted out into their permanent positions in late spring or early summer (of the following year). Layering in autumn. Easy, it takes about 6 months.

Layering is carried out in autumn. Normally via ground layering or simple layering, one of the lower stems or branches (of the tree) is bent down and the target region is buried in the soil. They are then pinned to hold the branches in place. This process takes about 6 months, before the new plant can be separated from the older shrub.

== Conservation ==
Its conservation status is Data deficient (DD), according to the IUCN (last assessed in 2014).

The species has recently been subjected to pressures from global warming, climate change, and anthropogenic pressure (Gupta and Sharma, 2015).

Many of the forests where C. jacquemontii is a native species, are being rapidly degraded through over-exploitation (of resources) and also habitat destruction, due to the search for fodder, fuel, food and medicinal purposes and other uses.

It has started to suffer from poor seed regeneration, as only a few seeds grow into seedlings near the maternal plants, due to the effects of trampling and grazing by animals both by wild as well as domesticated animals like goat, sheep, cow etc.

It may become a threatened species in the future (Paul et al. 2019).
