= C. chinensis =

C. chinensis may refer to:

- Calyptraea chinensis, the Chinese hat snail or Chinese hat shell, a small sea snail species found in North-West Africa, in the Mediterranean, the North Sea, the Black Sea and the Atlantic Ocean
- Canna chinensis, a garden plant
- Corylus chinensis, the Chinese filbert or Chinese hazel, a deciduous tree species native to western China
- Cryptocarya chinensis, the Chinese cryptocarya, a medium-sized evergreen tree species native to the subtropical forests of Taiwan, southern China and Japan

== See also ==
- Chinensis (disambiguation)
