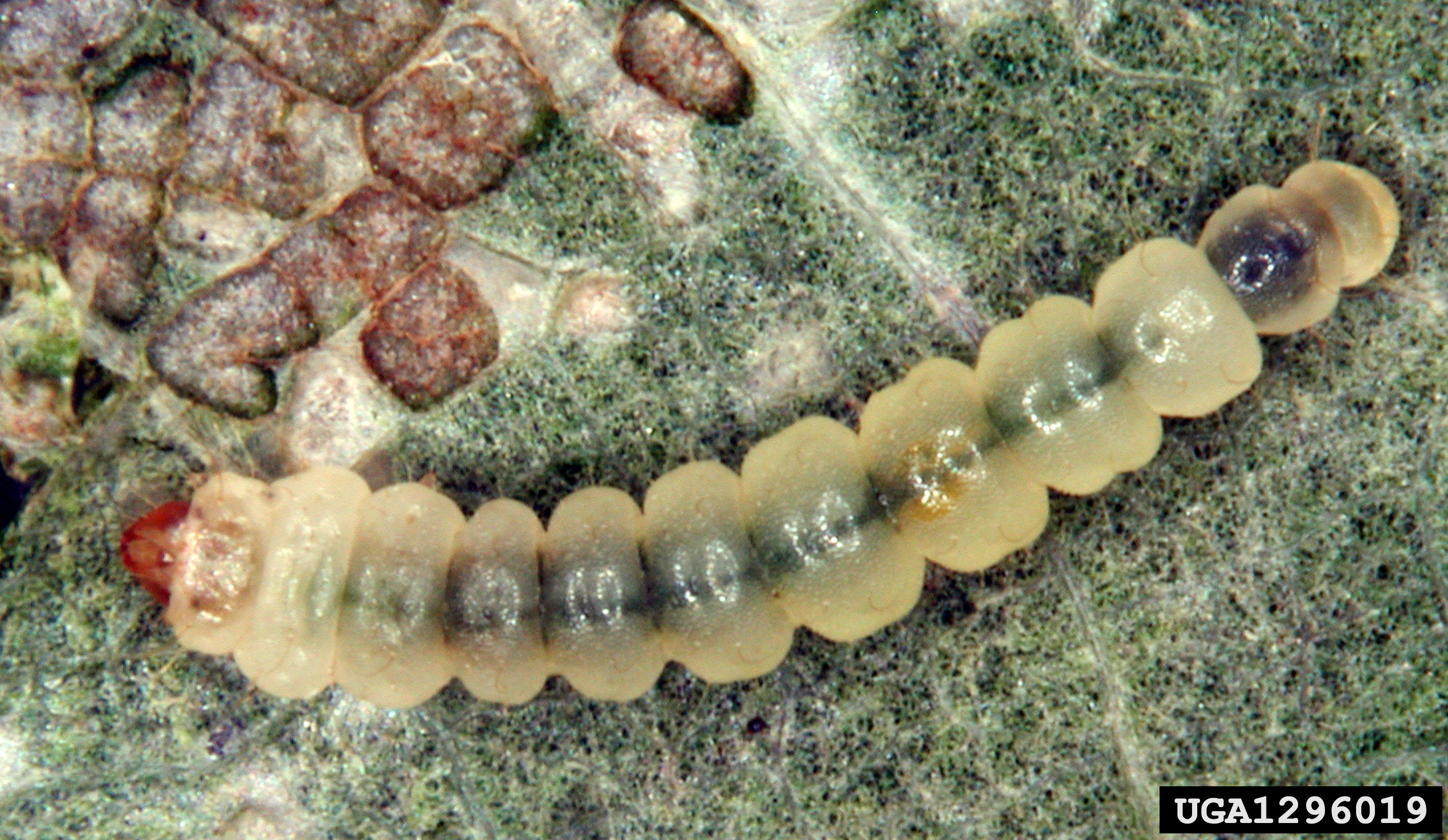

Scientific classification
- Domain: Eukaryota
- Kingdom: Animalia
- Phylum: Arthropoda
- Class: Insecta
- Order: Lepidoptera
- Family: Gracillariidae
- Genus: Phyllonorycter
- Species: P. froelichiella

Binomial name
- Phyllonorycter froelichiella (Zeller, 1839)

Synonyms
- Lithocolletis froelichiella Zeller, 1839

= Phyllonorycter froelichiella =

Species of moth

Phyllonorycter froelichiella is a moth of the family Gracillariidae. It is found in all of Europe, except Greece.

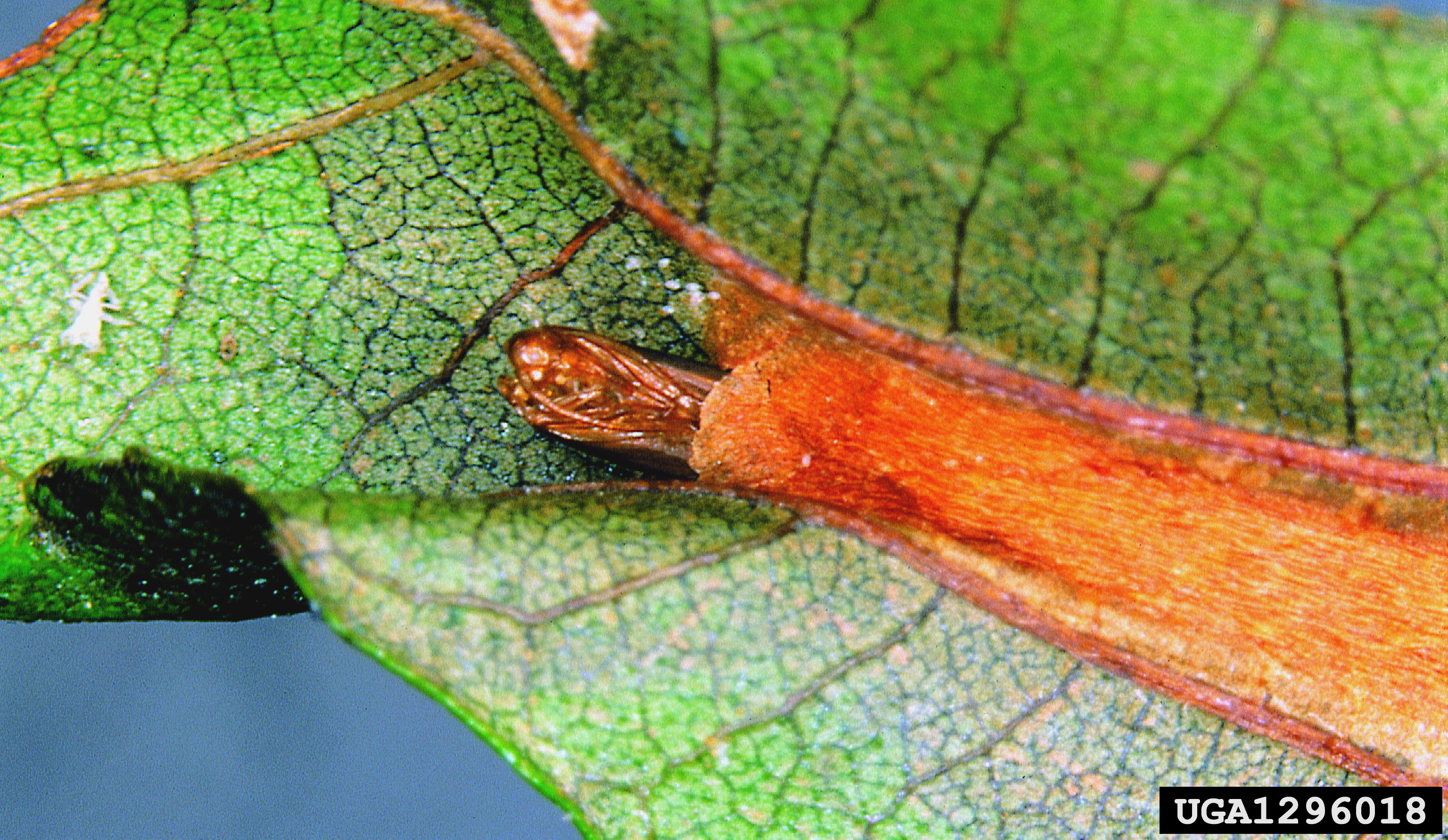
Pupa

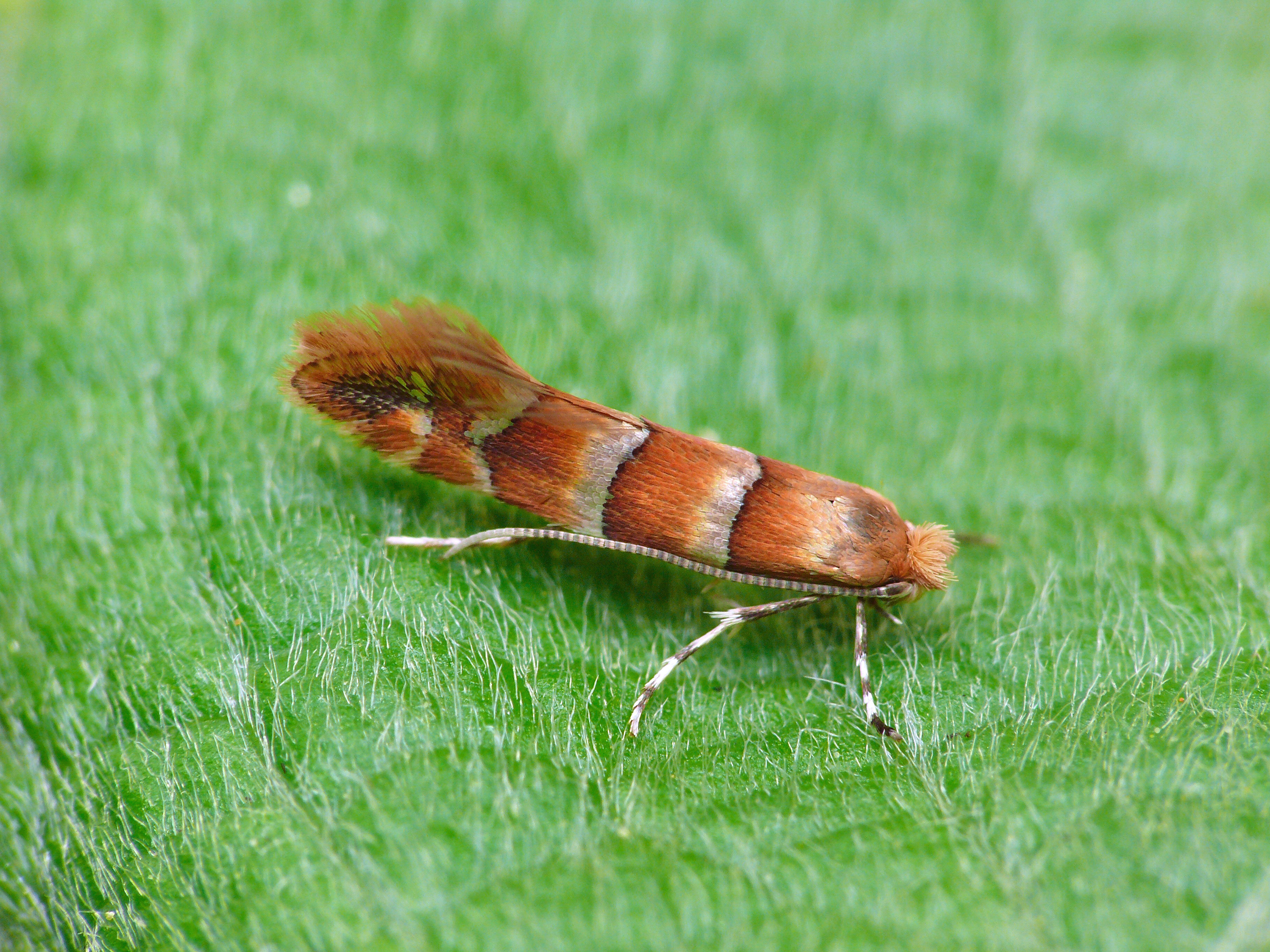
Imago

The wingspan is 9–10 mm. Differs from P. Nicellii as follows : forewings somewhat broader, more orange-tinged, markings more ochreous-tinged.

Adults are on wing from July to August in one generation in western Europe.

The larvae feed on Alnus glutinosa and Alnus incana, mining the leaves of their host plant.
