= Catkin =

Cylindrical flower cluster

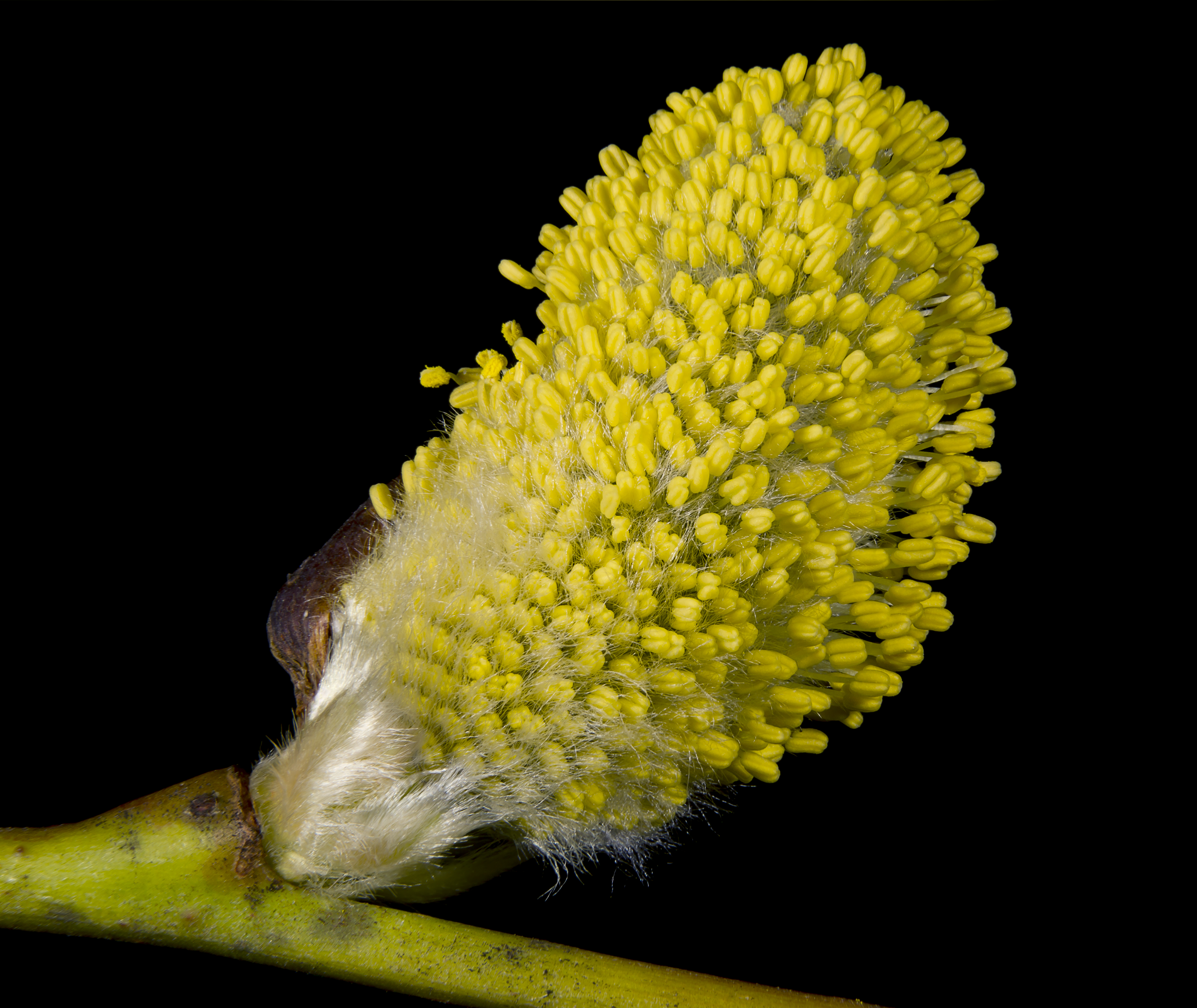
Detail of a male flowering catkin on a willow (Salix sp.)

A catkin or ament is a slim, cylindrical flower cluster (a spike), with inconspicuous or no petals, usually wind-pollinated (anemophilous) but sometimes insect-pollinated (as in Salix). It contains many, usually unisexual flowers, arranged closely along a central stem that is often drooping. Catkins are found in many plant families, including Betulaceae, Fagaceae, Moraceae, and Salicaceae.

== Occurrence ==
Catkin-bearing plants include many trees or shrubs such as birch, willow, oak, aspen, hickory, sweet chestnut, and sweetfern (Comptonia).

In many of these plants, only the male flowers form catkins, and the female flowers are single (hazel, oak), a cone (alder), or other types (mulberry). Corylus jacquemontii has male catkins and also female spikes. In other plants (such as poplar), both male and female flowers are borne in catkins. Populus alba has male catkins which are grey and the female catkins are greyish-green.

While the blooming months for catkins may vary due to factors such as climate change and latitude, the following are some general timeframes: Hazel catkins bloom from January to March, alder catkins from February to March, silver birch catkins from March to May, oak catkins from April to May, and white willow catkins from April to May.

In Britain, catkins can be seen in January or February, when many trees are bare for winter. They can even occur in December.

== Evolution ==
For some time, catkins were believed to be a key synapomorphy among the proposed Hamamelididae, also known as Amentiferae (i.e., literally plants bearing aments). Based on molecular phylogeny work, it is now believed that Hamamelididae is a polyphyletic group. This suggests that the catkin flower arrangement has arisen at least twice independently by convergent evolution, in Fagales and in Salicaceae. Such a convergent evolution raises questions about what the ancestral inflorescence characters might be and how catkins did evolve in these two lineages.

== Etymology ==
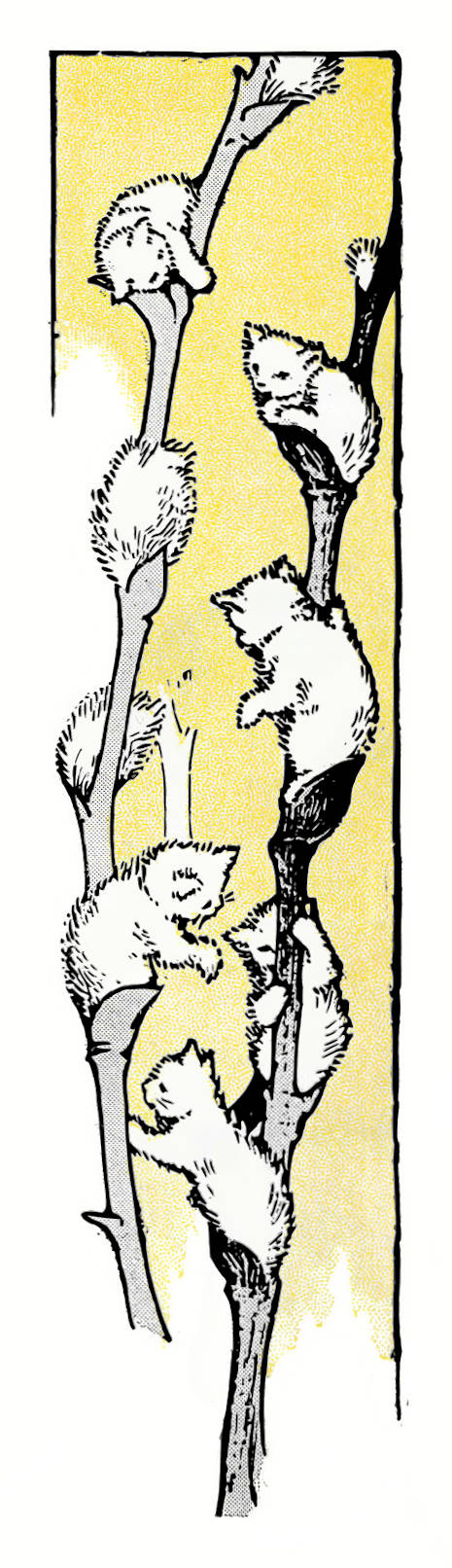
Etymology illustrated by pussy willow catkins from a children's book

The word catkin is a loanword from the Middle Dutch katteken, meaning "kitten" (compare also German Kätzchen). This name is due either to the resemblance of the lengthy sorts of catkins to a kitten's tail, or to the fine fur found on some catkins. Ament is from the Latin amentum, meaning "thong" or "strap".

== Gallery ==
Catkins in Fagales

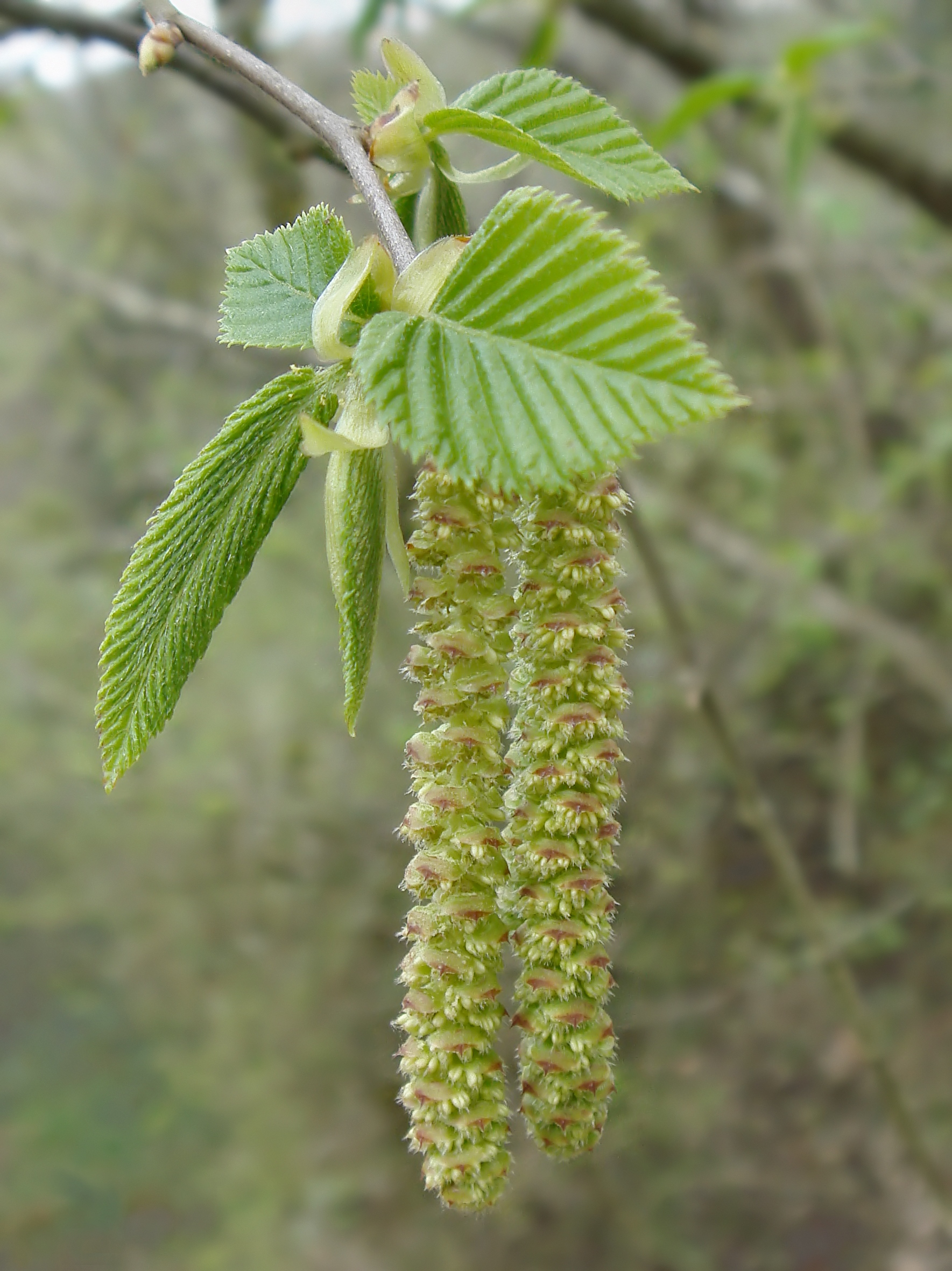
Male catkins of hop-hornbeam (Ostrya carpinifolia)

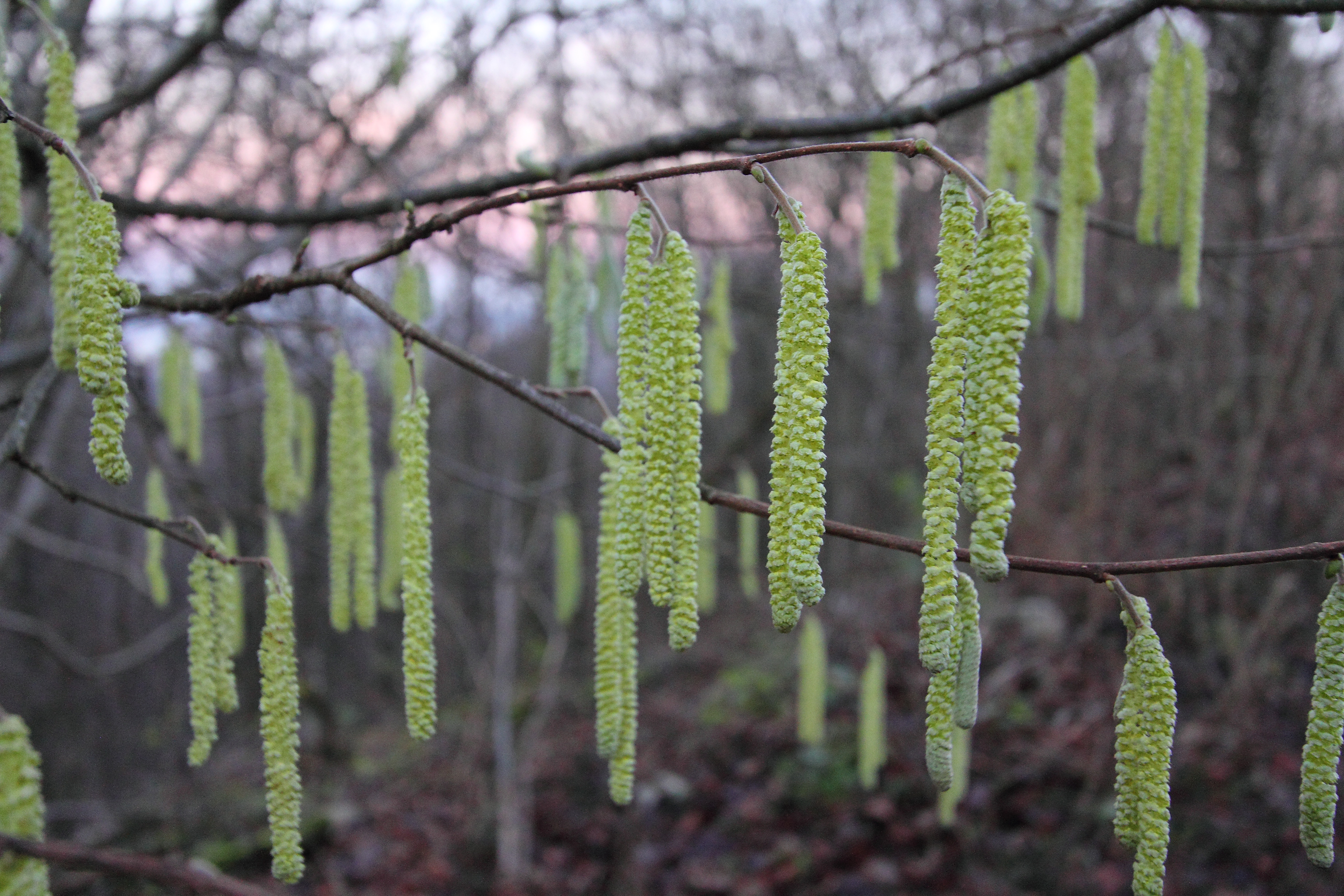
Young male catkins of hazel (Corylus avellana)

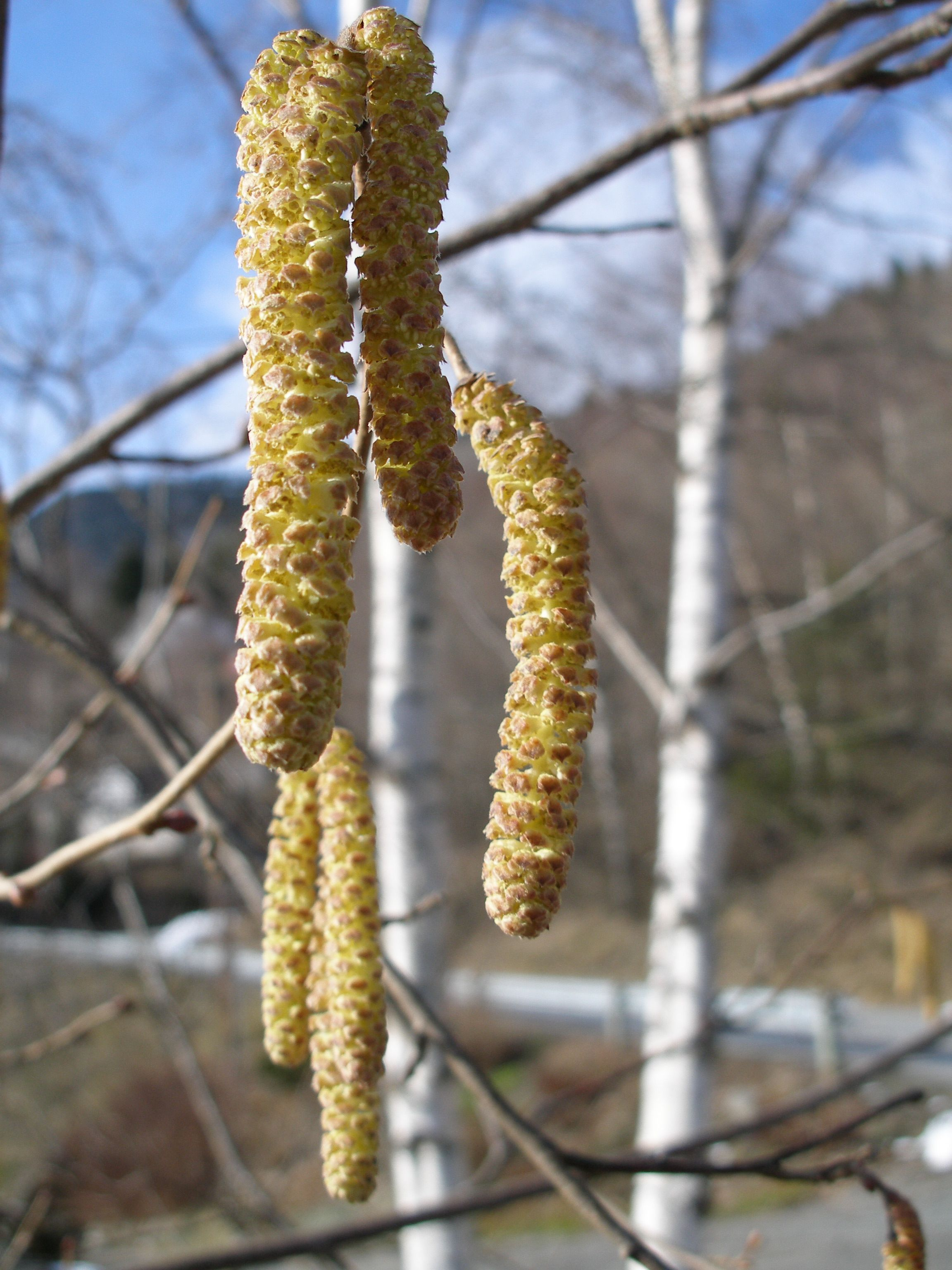
Mature male catkins of hazel (Corylus avellana)
Catkins in Salicaceae

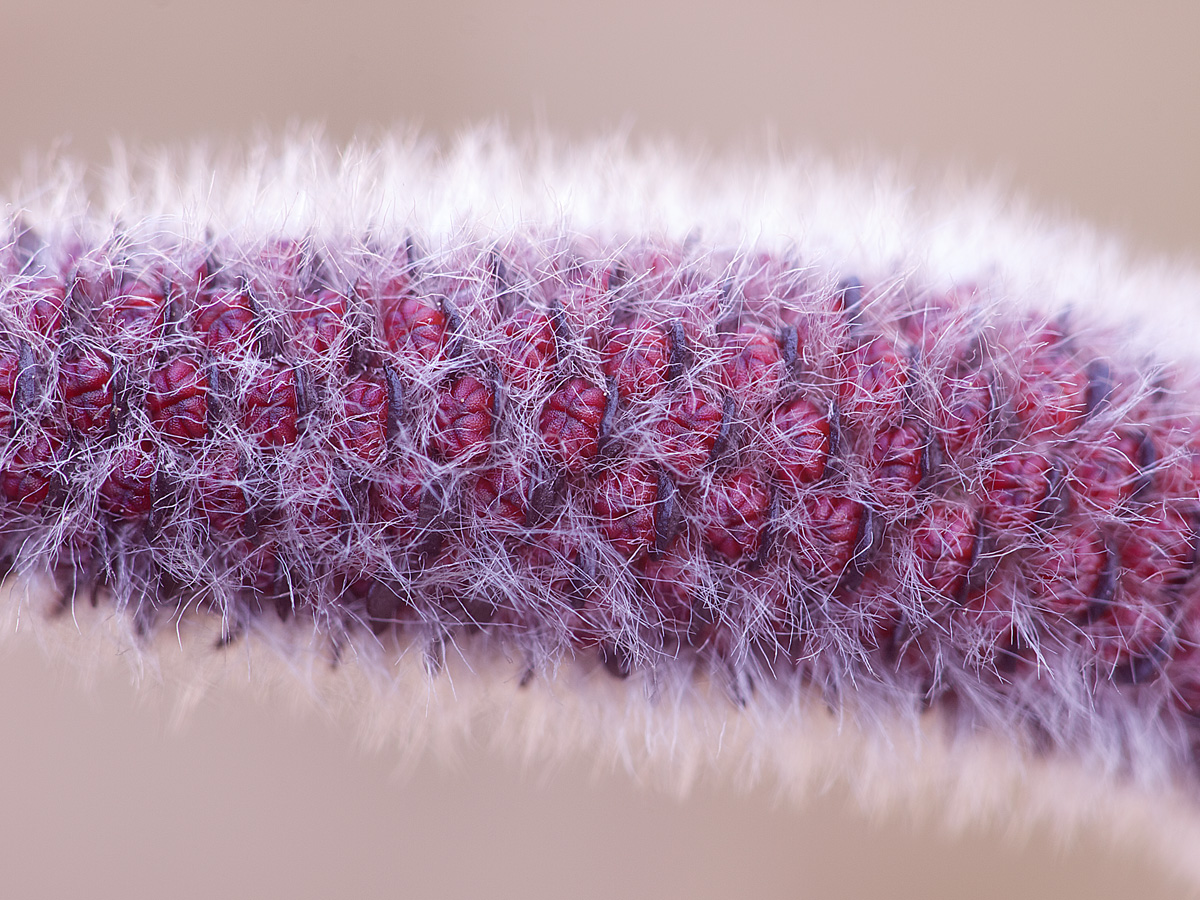
Young male catkin of a willow (Salix sp.)

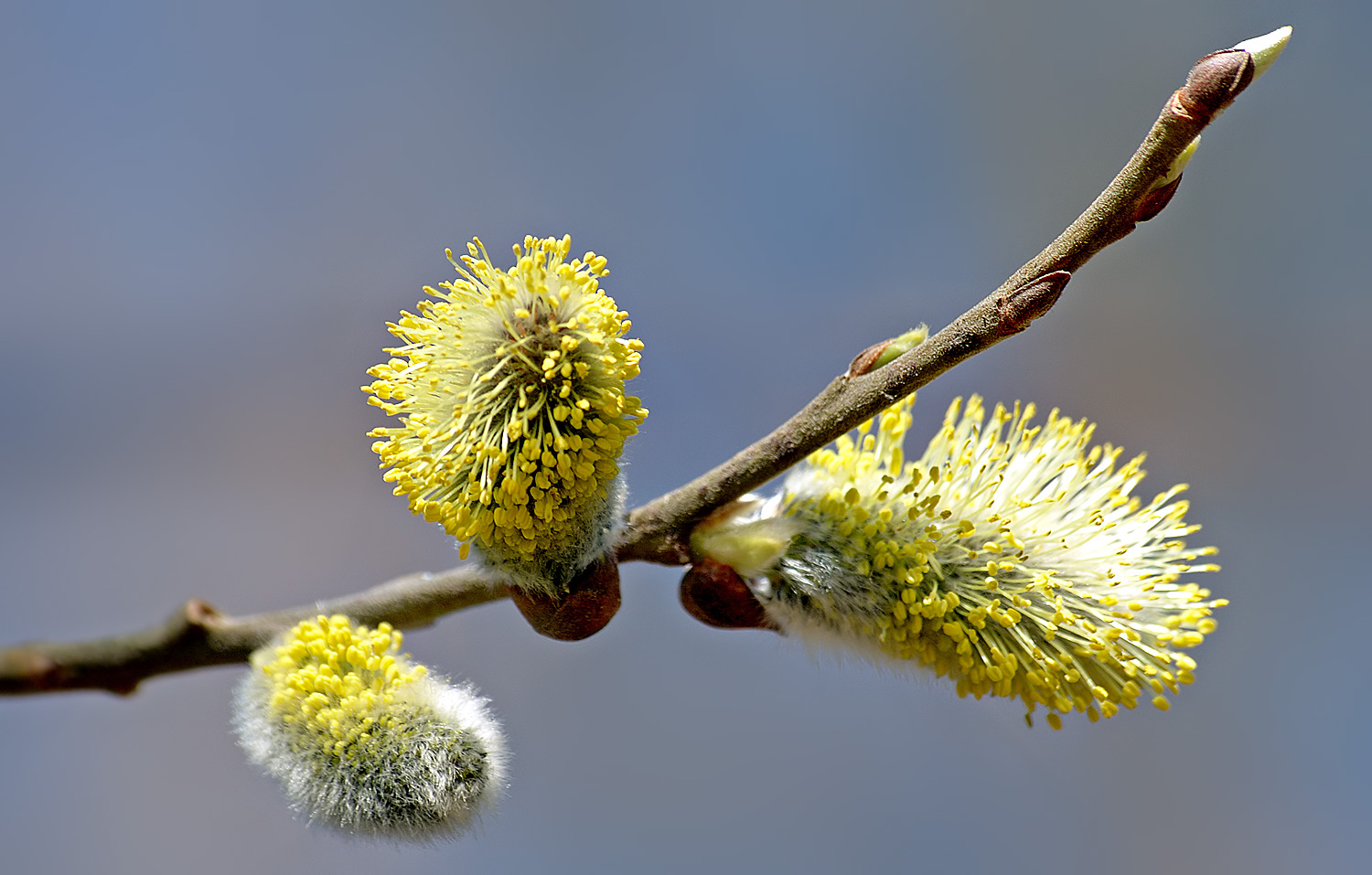
Three male catkins on a willow (Salix sp.)

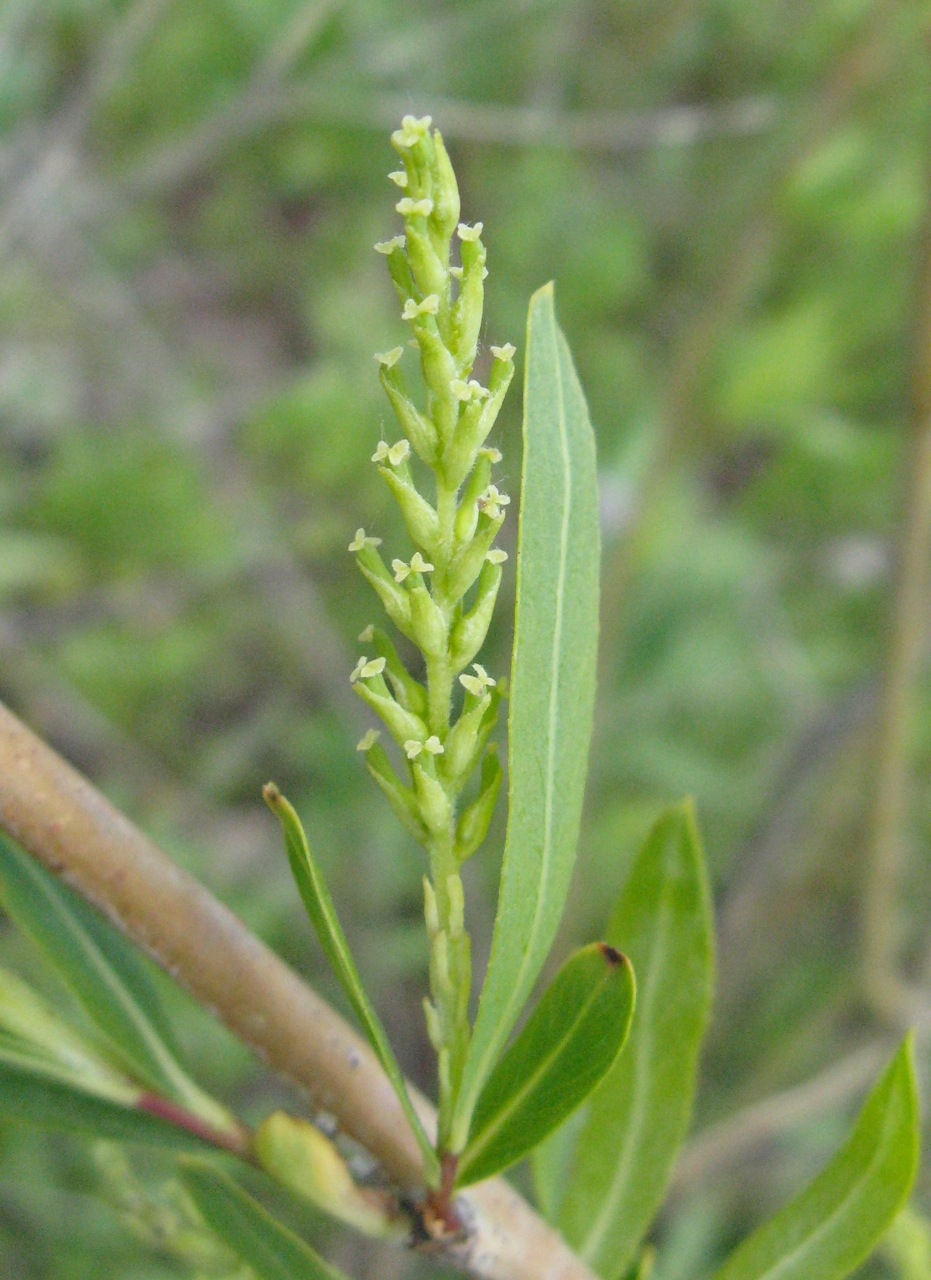
Female flowering catkin on a willow (Salix sp.)
