= Getahovit =

Village in Tavush, Armenia

Getahovit Գետահովիտ
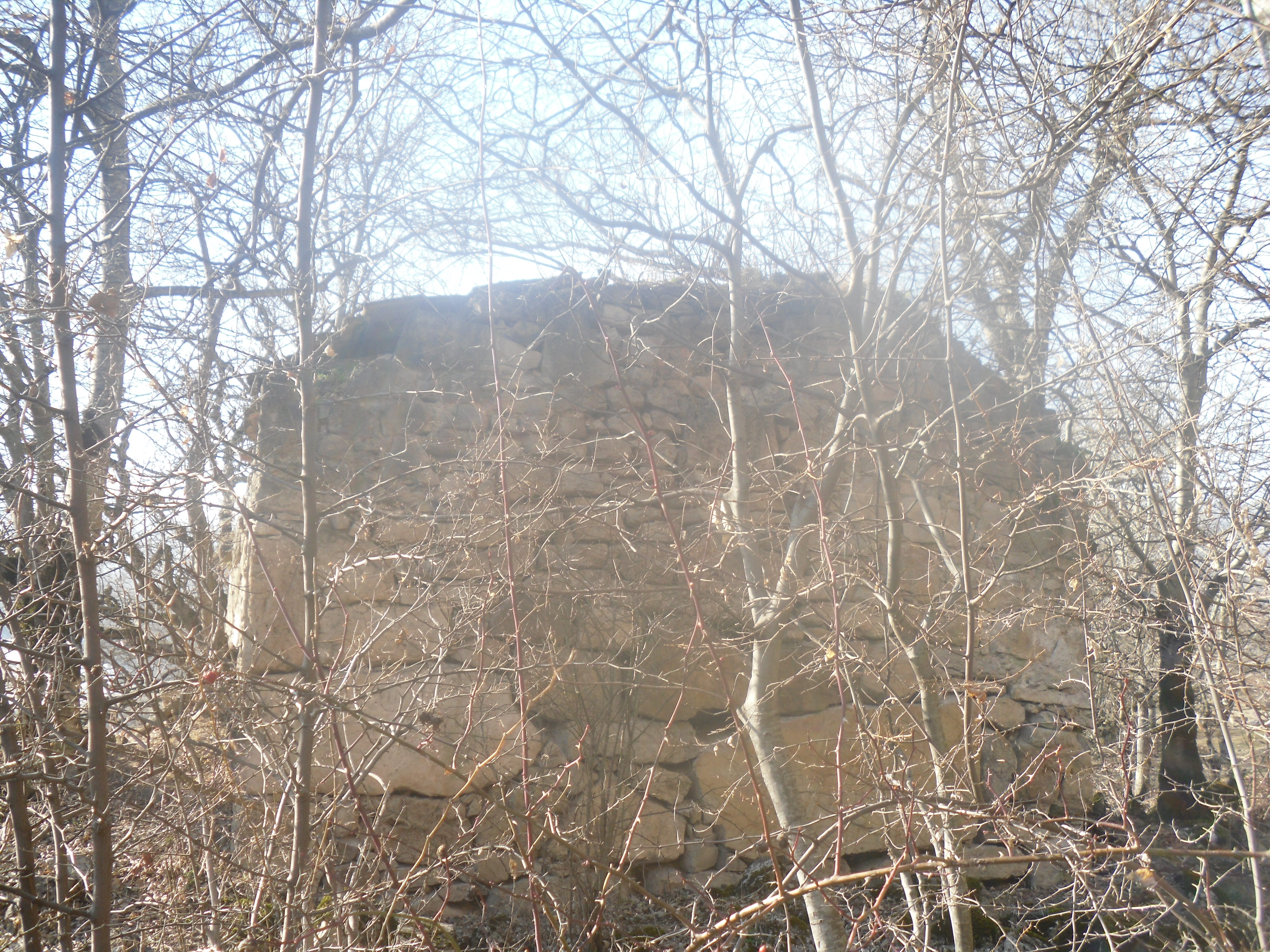
- Mijnashen Church near Getahovit

- Location within Armenia Location within Tavush
- Coordinates: 40°53′45″N 45°07′53″E
- Country: Armenia
- Province: Tavush
- Municipality: Ijevan
- Elevation: 835 m (2,740 ft)

Population (2011)
  - Total: 2,123
- Time zone: UTC+4 (AMT)

Getahovit (Armenian: Գետահովիտ) is a village in the Ijevan Municipality of the Tavush Province of Armenia.
