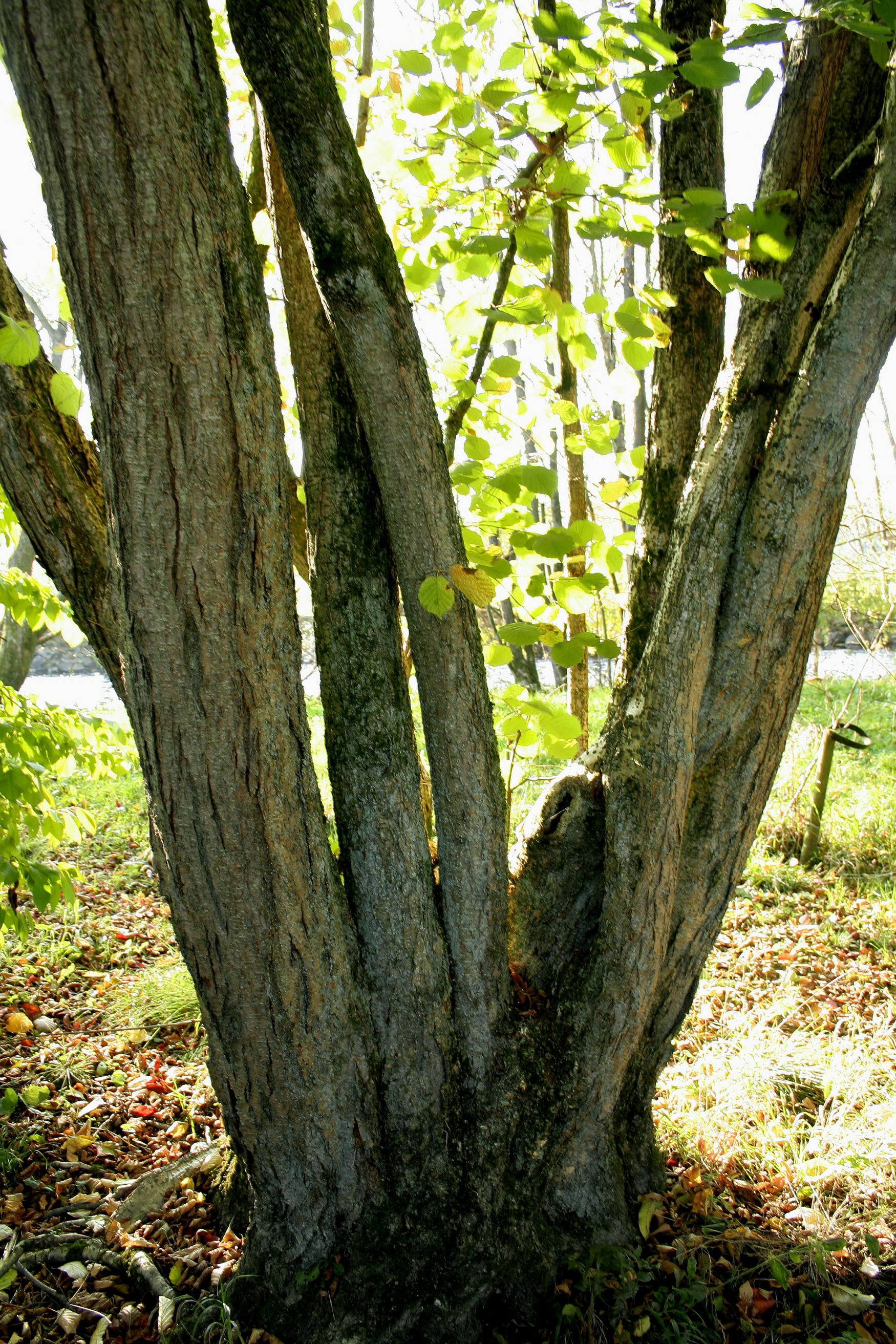

Conservation status
- Least Concern (IUCN 3.1)

Scientific classification
- Kingdom: Plantae
- Clade: Embryophytes
- Clade: Tracheophytes
- Clade: Angiosperms
- Clade: Eudicots
- Clade: Rosids
- Order: Fagales
- Family: Betulaceae
- Genus: Corylus
- Species: C. chinensis

Binomial name
- Corylus chinensis Franch.

Synonyms
- Corylus chinensis var. macrocarpa Hu; Corylus colurna var. chinensis (Franch.) Burkill; Corylus papyracea Hickel

= Corylus chinensis =

Species of tree

Corylus chinensis, common names Chinese filbert and Chinese hazel, is a deciduous shrub or tree native to south-central China. This tree is considered vulnerable due to its rarity.

== Description ==
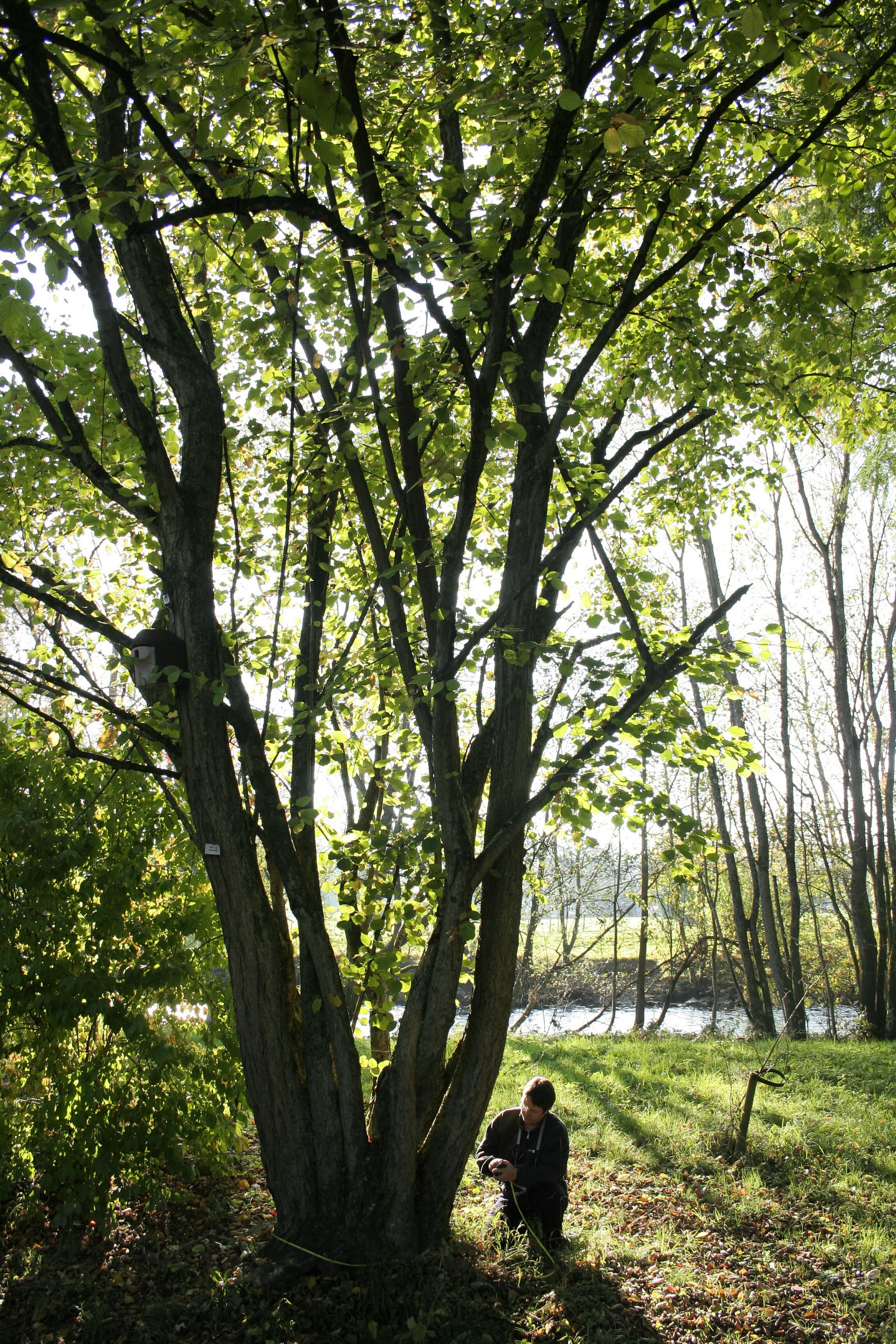
Image showing relative size

Corylus chinensis is a deciduous tree which grows up to 20 metres tall. It has gray-brown, fissured bark, with mottled streaks. The branchlets are a purplish-brown colour, and are slender and sparsely villous. The leaves range from ovate to obovate-elliptic and have a doubly serrated, irregular margin. It flowers from April to May, and fruits ripen in September and October.

== Distribution and habitat ==
Corylus chinensis is native to Henan, Hubei, Hunan, Shaanxi, Sichuan, and Yunnan provinces of south-central China. It grows on moist slopes of temperate and subtropical broadleaf forests from 1,200 to 3,500 metres elevation. It prefers sunny locations and typically grows in the forest canopy or forest edges on deep, fertile, well-drained neutral or acidic soils.

== Uses ==
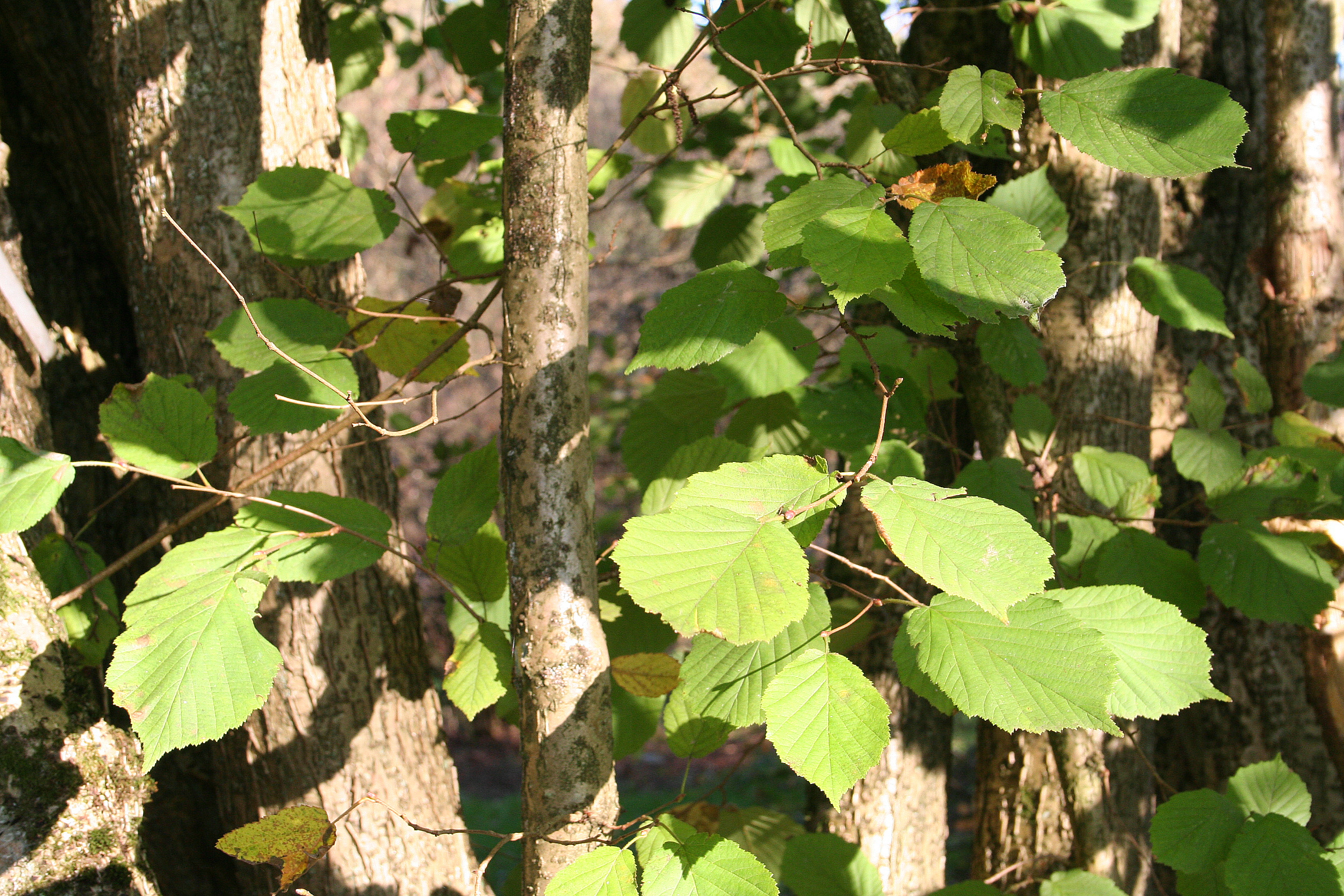
Foliage

Both the oil and seeds of Corylus chinensis are edible.
