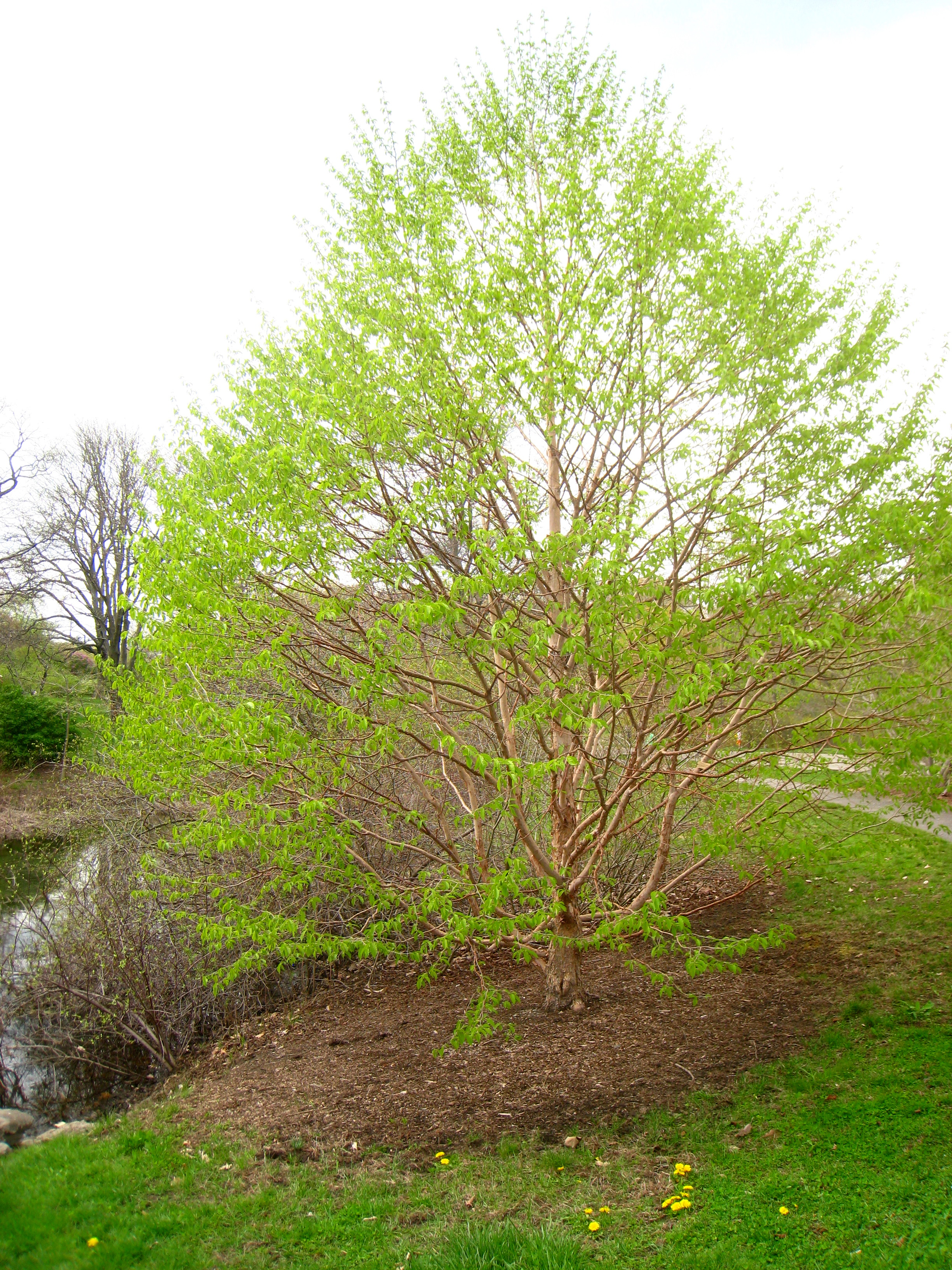

Conservation status
- Least Concern (IUCN 3.1)

Scientific classification
- Kingdom: Plantae
- Clade: Embryophytes
- Clade: Tracheophytes
- Clade: Angiosperms
- Clade: Eudicots
- Clade: Rosids
- Order: Fagales
- Family: Betulaceae
- Genus: Corylus
- Species: C. fargesii

Binomial name
- Corylus fargesii (Franch.) C.K.Schneid.

Synonyms
- Corylus mandshurica var. fargesii (Franch.) Burkill; Corylus rostrata var. fargesii Franch.

= Corylus fargesii =

Species of flowering plant

Corylus fargesii is a species of flowering plant in the family Betulaceae. It is a tree native to southern and central China including Inner Mongolia.

== Description ==
It can be a large tree, growing up to 25 metres tall. It flowers between May and July and fruits ripen in July and August.

== Distribution and habitat ==
Corylus fargesii is native to temperate forests in mountain valleys from 800 to 3,000 metres elevation. It grows in full sun to partial shade and grows in slightly acidic to neutral soils.
