= 1994 in paleontology =

Paleontology or palaeontology is the study of prehistoric life forms on Earth through the examination of plant and animal fossils. This includes the study of body fossils, tracks (ichnites), burrows, cast-off parts, fossilised feces (coprolites), palynomorphs and chemical residues. Because humans have encountered fossils for millennia, paleontology has a long history both before and after becoming formalized as a science. This article records significant discoveries and events related to paleontology that occurred or were published in the year 1994.

== Plants ==
=== Conifers ===
Name	Novelty	Status	Authors	Age	Type locality	Location	Notes	Images
Diploporus	Gen et sp nov	valid	Manchester	Middle Eocene	Clarno Formation	USA; Oregon	Fossil Yew Genus, type species D. torreyoides	
Taxus masonii	Sp nov	valid	Manchester	Middle Eocene	Clarno Formation	USA; Oregon	Fossil Yew species	
Torreya clarnensis	Sp nov	valid	Manchester	Middle Eocene	Clarno Formation	USA; Oregon	Fossil nutmeg yew species	

=== Angiosperms ===
Name	Novelty	Status	Authors	Age	Unit	Location	Notes	Images
Actinidia oregonensis	Sp nov	valid	Manchester	Middle Eocene	Clarno Formation	USA; Oregon	A Kiwi species	
Alangium eydei	Sp nov	valid	Manchester	Middle Eocene	Clarno Formation	USA; Oregon	A dogwood species	
Alangium rotundicarpum	Sp nov	valid	Manchester	Middle Eocene	Clarno Formation	USA; Oregon	A dogwood species	
Ampelocissus auriforma	Sp nov	valid	Manchester	Middle Eocene	Clarno Formation	USA; Oregon	A vitaceous species	
Ampelocissus scottii	Sp nov	valid	Manchester	Middle Eocene	Clarno Formation	USA; Oregon	A vitaceous species	
Ampelopsis rooseae	Sp nov	valid	Manchester	Middle Eocene	Clarno Formation	USA; Oregon	A vitaceous species	
Anamirta leiocarpa	Sp nov	valid	Manchester	Middle Eocene	Clarno Formation	USA; Oregon	A moonseed species	
Ankistrosperma	Gen et sp nov	valid	Manchester	Middle Eocene	Clarno Formation	USA; Oregon	A seed of uncertain placement. Type species A. spitzerae	
Anonaspermum bonesii	Sp nov	valid	Manchester	Middle Eocene	Clarno Formation	USA; Oregon	A custard apple relative	
Anonaspermum rotundum	Sp nov	valid	Manchester	Middle Eocene	Clarno Formation	USA; Oregon	A custard apple relative	
Anonymocarpa	Gen et sp nov	valid	Manchester	Middle Eocene	Clarno Formation	USA; Oregon	A seed of uncertain placement. Type species A. ovoidea	
Aphananthe maii	Sp nov	valid	Manchester	Middle Eocene	Clarno Formation	USA; Oregon	A cannabaceous species	
Ascosphaera	Gen et sp nov	valid	Manchester	Middle Eocene	Clarno Formation	USA; Oregon	A seed of uncertain placement. Type species A. eocenis	
Atriaecarpum clarnense	Sp nov	valid	Manchester	Middle Eocene	Clarno Formation	USA; Oregon	A moonseed species	
Axinosperma	Gen et sp nov	valid	Manchester	Middle Eocene	Clarno Formation	USA; Oregon	A seed of uncertain placement. Type species A. agnostum	
Bonesia	Gen et sp nov	valid	Manchester	Middle Eocene	Clarno Formation	USA; Oregon	A seed of uncertain placement. Type species B. spatulata	
Bumelia? globosa	Sp nov	jr synonym	(Manchester) Manchester	Middle Eocene	Clarno Formation	USA; Oregon	A lardizabalaceous species; Moved to Sargentodoxa globosa in 1999	
Bursericarpum oregonense	Sp nov	valid	Manchester	Middle Eocene	Clarno Formation	USA; Oregon	A torchwood family species	
Calycocarpum crassicrustae	Sp nov	valid	Manchester	Middle Eocene	Clarno Formation	USA; Oregon	A moonseed species	
Castanopsis crepetii	Sp nov	valid	Manchester	Middle Eocene	Clarno Formation	USA; Oregon	A chinkapin species	
Celtis burnhamae	Sp nov	valid	Manchester	Middle Eocene	Clarno Formation	USA; Oregon	A cannabaceous species	
Cleyera grotei	Sp nov	valid	Manchester	Middle Eocene	Clarno Formation	USA; Oregon	A pentaphylacaceous species	
Comicilabium	Gen et sp nov	valid	Manchester	Middle Eocene	Clarno Formation	USA; Oregon	An icacinaceous relative. type species C. atkinsii.	
Comminicarpa	Gen et sp nov	valid	Manchester	Middle Eocene	Clarno Formation	USA; Oregon	A seed of uncertain placement. Type species C. friisae	
Cornus clarnensis	Sp nov	valid	Manchester	Middle Eocene	Clarno Formation	USA; Oregon	A dogwood species	
Coryloides	Gen et sp nov	valid	Manchester	Middle Eocene	Clarno Formation	USA; Oregon	A hazelnut relative, Type species C. hancockii	
Cuneisemen	Gen et sp nov	valid	Manchester	Middle Eocene	Clarno Formation	USA; Oregon	A seed of uncertain placement. Type species C. truncatum	
Curvitinospora	Gen et sp nov	valid	Manchester	Middle Eocene	Clarno Formation	USA; Oregon	A moonseed relative. Type species C. formanii	
Davisicarpum limacioides	Sp nov	valid	Manchester	Middle Eocene	Clarno Formation	USA; Oregon	A moonseed species.	
Dentisemen	Gen et sp nov	valid	Manchester	Middle Eocene	Clarno Formation	USA; Oregon	A seed of uncertain placement. Type species D. parvum	
Deviacer	Gen et sp nov	valid	Manchester	Middle Eocene	Clarno Formation	USA; Oregon	A milkwort genus. Type species D. wolfei	
Diploclisia auriformis	Comb nov	jr synonym	(Hollick) Manchester	Paleocene/Eocene	"King Salmon Lake flora"	USA; Alaska	A moonseed species. Moved from Carpolithes auriformis (1936); Moved to Stephania auriformis in 2018	
Durocarpus	Gen et sp nov	valid	Manchester	Middle Eocene	Clarno Formation	USA; Oregon	A seed of uncertain placement. Type species D. cordatus	
Emmenopterys dilcheri	Sp nov	valid	Manchester	Middle Eocene	Clarno Formation	USA; Oregon	A rubiaceous species.	
Eohypserpa scottii	Sp nov	valid	Manchester	Middle Eocene	Clarno Formation	USA; Oregon	A moonseed species.	
Eucommia constans	Sp nov	valid	Magallón-Puebl & Cevallos-Ferriz	Miocene - Pleistocene	Pié de Vaca Formation	Mexico	Youngest Eucommia sp. in North America.	
Ferrignocarpus	Gen et sp nov	valid	Manchester	Middle Eocene	Clarno Formation	USA; Oregon	A seed of uncertain placement. Type species F. bivalvis	
Fimbrialata	Gen et sp nov	valid	Manchester	Middle Eocene	Clarno Formation	USA; Oregon	A seed of uncertain placement. Type species F. wingii	
Fortunearites	Gen et sp nov	valid	Manchester	Middle Eocene	Clarno Formation	USA; Oregon	A witch-hazel relative, type species F. endressii	
Fragarites	Gen et sp nov	valid	Manchester	Middle Eocene	Clarno Formation	USA; Oregon	A seed of uncertain placement. Type species F. ramificans	
Globulicarpium	Gen et sp nov	valid	Manchester	Middle Eocene	Clarno Formation	USA; Oregon	A seed of uncertain placement. Type species G. levigatum	
Hexacarpellites	Gen et sp nov	valid	Manchester	Middle Eocene	Clarno Formation	USA; Oregon	A seed of uncertain placement. Type species H. hallii	
Hydrangea knowltonii	Sp nov	valid	Manchester	Middle Eocene	Clarno Formation	USA; Oregon	A Hydrangea species.	
Joejonesia	Gen et sp nov	valid	Manchester	Middle Eocene	Clarno Formation	USA; Oregon	A seed of uncertain placement. Type species J. globosa	
lodes chandlerae	Sp nov	valid	Manchester	Middle Eocene	Clarno Formation	USA; Oregon	An icacinaceous species.	
Iodicarpa	Gen et sp nov	valid	Manchester	Middle Eocene	Clarno Formation	USA; Oregon	An icacinaceous relative. type species I. parvum, includes I. lenticularis	
Kardiasperma	Gen et sp nov	valid	Manchester	Middle Eocene	Clarno Formation	USA; Oregon	A hazelnut relative, type species K. parvum	
Laurocalyx wheelerae	Sp nov	valid	Manchester	Middle Eocene	Clarno Formation	USA; Oregon	A laural relative	
Laurocarpum hancockii	Sp nov	valid	Manchester	Middle Eocene	Clarno Formation	USA; Oregon	A laural relative	
Laurocarpum nutbedensis	Sp nov	valid	Manchester	Middle Eocene	Clarno Formation	USA; Oregon	A laural relative	
Laurocarpum raisinoides	Sp nov	valid	Manchester	Middle Eocene	Clarno Formation	USA; Oregon	A laural relative	
Lignicarpus	Gen et sp nov	valid	Manchester	Middle Eocene	Clarno Formation	USA; Oregon	A seed of uncertain placement. Type species L. crassimuri	
Ligniglobus	Gen et sp nov	valid	Manchester	Middle Eocene	Clarno Formation	USA; Oregon	A seed of uncertain placement. Type species L. sinuosifibrae	
Lindera clarnensis	Sp nov	valid	Manchester	Middle Eocene	Clarno Formation	USA; Oregon	A spicebush	
Lunaticarpa	Gen et sp nov	valid	Manchester	Middle Eocene	Clarno Formation	USA; Oregon	A seed of uncertain placement. Type species L. curvistriata	
Magnolia muldoonae	Sp nov	valid	Manchester	Middle Eocene	Clarno Formation	USA; Oregon	A Magnolia species	
Magnolia paroblonga	Sp nov	valid	Manchester	Middle Eocene	Clarno Formation	USA; Oregon	A Magnolia species	
Magnolia tiffneyi	Sp nov	valid	Manchester	Middle Eocene	Clarno Formation	USA; Oregon	A Magnolia species	
Mastixicarpum occidentale	Sp nov	valid	Manchester	Middle Eocene	Clarno Formation	USA; Oregon	A Tupelo relative	
Meliosma beusekomii	sp nov	valid	Manchester	Middle Eocene	Clarno Formation	USA; Oregon	A sabiaceous species.	
Meliosma bonesii	sp nov	valid	Manchester	Middle Eocene	Clarno Formation	USA; Oregon	A sabiaceous species.	
Meliosma elongicarpa	sp nov	valid	Manchester	Middle Eocene	Clarno Formation	USA; Oregon	A sabiaceous species.	
Meliosma leptocarpa	sp nov	valid	Manchester	Middle Eocene	Clarno Formation	USA; Oregon	A sabiaceous species.	
Microphallus	Gen et sp nov	valid	Manchester	Middle Eocene	Clarno Formation	USA; Oregon	A seed of uncertain placement. Type species M. perplexus	
Nephrosemen	Gen et sp nov	valid	Manchester	Middle Eocene	Clarno Formation	USA; Oregon	A seed of uncertain placement. Type species N. reticulatus	
Nyssa scottii	sp nov	valid	Manchester	Middle Eocene	Clarno Formation	USA; Oregon	A Tupelo relative	
Nyssa spatulata	Comb nov	valid	(Scott) Manchester	Middle Eocene	Clarno Formation	USA; Oregon	A Tupelo, new comb for Palaeonyssa spatulata Scott, 1954	
Omsicarpium	Gen et sp nov	valid	Manchester	Middle Eocene	Clarno Formation	USA; Oregon	A seed of uncertain placement. Type species O. striatum	
Palaeoallophylus globosa	Sp nov	valid	Manchester	Middle Eocene	Clarno Formation	USA; Oregon	A soapberry species.	
Palaeoallophylus gordonii	Sp nov	valid	Manchester	Middle Eocene	Clarno Formation	USA; Oregon	A soapberry species.	
Paleopanax	Gen et sp nov	valid	Manchester	Middle Eocene	Clarno Formation	USA; Oregon	A ginseng genus, type species P. oregonensis	
Paleoplatycarya? hickeyi	Sp nov	valid	Manchester	Middle Eocene	Clarno Formation	USA; Oregon	A Platycarya relative species.	
Parthenocissus clarnensis	Sp nov	valid	Manchester	Middle Eocene	Clarno Formation	USA; Oregon	A vitaceous species	
Pasternackia	Gen et sp nov	valid	Manchester	Middle Eocene	Clarno Formation	USA; Oregon	A seed of uncertain placement. Type species P. pusilla	
Pentoperculum	Gen et comb nov	valid	Manchester	Middle Eocene	London Clay	UK; England	A Sumac relative. A new genus for Dracontomelon minimus (Reid & Chandler, 1933)	
Pileosperma	Gen et sp nov	valid	Manchester	Middle Eocene	Clarno Formation	USA; Oregon	A seed of uncertain placement. Type species P. minutum, also includes P. ovatum	
Pistachioides	Gen et sp nov	valid	Manchester	Middle Eocene	Clarno Formation	USA; Oregon	A seed of uncertain placement. Type species P. striata	
Platanus hirticarpa	Sp nov	valid	Manchester	Middle Eocene	Clarno Formation	USA; Oregon	A platanaceous Infructescence species.	
Polygrana nutbedense	Gen et sp nov	valid	Manchester	Middle Eocene	Clarno Formation	USA; Oregon	A seed of uncertain placement. Type species P. dictyum	
Polygrana	Gen et sp nov	valid	Manchester	Middle Eocene	Clarno Formation	USA; Oregon	A seed of uncertain placement. Type species P. nutbedense	
Prunus olsonii	Sp nov	valid	Manchester	Middle Eocene	Clarno Formation	USA; Oregon	A cherry/plum species.	
Prunus weinsteinii	Sp nov	valid	Manchester	Middle Eocene	Clarno Formation	USA; Oregon	A cherry/plum species.	
Pteronepelys	Gen et sp nov	valid	Manchester	Middle Eocene	Clarno Formation	USA; Oregon	A seed of uncertain placement. Type species P. wehrii	Pteronepelys wehrii
Pulvinisperma	Gen et sp nov	valid	Manchester	Middle Eocene	Clarno Formation	USA; Oregon	A seed of uncertain placement. Type species P. minutum	
Pyrenacantha occidentalis	Sp nov	valid	Manchester	Middle Eocene	Clarno Formation	USA; Oregon	An icacinaceous species.	
Pyrisemen	Gen et sp nov	valid	Manchester	Middle Eocene	Clarno Formation	USA; Oregon	A seed of uncertain placement. Type species P. attenuatum	
Quintacava	Gen et sp nov	valid	Manchester	Middle Eocene	Clarno Formation	USA; Oregon	A seed of uncertain placement. Type species Q. velosida	
Rhus rooseae	Sp nov	valid	Manchester	Middle Eocene	Clarno Formation	USA; Oregon	A Sumac species	
Sabia prefoetida	Comb nov	valid	(Becker) Manchester	Late Eocene	Ruby flora	USA; Montana	A sabiaceous species. Moved from Symplocarpus prefoetidus Becker 1969	
Sambucuspermites	Gen et sp nov	valid	Manchester	Middle Eocene	Clarno Formation	USA; Oregon	A seed of uncertain placement. Type species S. rugulosus	
Saxifragispermum tetragonalis	Sp nov	valid	Manchester	Middle Eocene	Clarno Formation	USA; Oregon	A willow relative	
Scabraecarpium	Gen et sp nov	valid	Manchester	Middle Eocene	Clarno Formation	USA; Oregon	A seed of uncertain placement. Type species S. clarnense	
Scalaritheca	Gen et sp nov	valid	Manchester	Middle Eocene	Clarno Formation	USA; Oregon	A seed of uncertain placement. Type species S. biseriata	
Scaphicarpium	Gen et sp nov	valid	Manchester	Middle Eocene	Clarno Formation	USA; Oregon	A seed of uncertain placement. Type species S. radiatum	
Schisandra oregonensis	Sp nov	valid	Manchester	Middle Eocene	Clarno Formation	USA; Oregon	A magnolia vine species.	
Sphaerosperma	Gen et sp nov	valid	Manchester	Middle Eocene	Clarno Formation	USA; Oregon	A seed of uncertain placement. Type species S. riesii	
Sphenosperma	Gen et sp nov	valid	Manchester	Middle Eocene	Clarno Formation	USA; Oregon	A seed of uncertain placement. Type species S. baccatum	
Stockeycarpa	Gen et sp nov	valid	Manchester	Middle Eocene	Clarno Formation	USA; Oregon	A seed of uncertain placement. Type species S. globosa	
Striatisperma	Gen et sp nov	valid	Manchester	Middle Eocene	Clarno Formation	USA; Oregon	A seed of uncertain placement. Type species S. coronapunctatum	
Symplocos nooteboomii	Sp nov	valid	Manchester	Middle Eocene	Clarno Formation	USA; Oregon	A Symplocaceae species.	
Tanyoplatanus	Gen et sp nov	valid	Manchester	Middle Eocene	Clarno Formation	USA; Oregon	A platanaceous Infructescence genus. Type species T. cranei.	
Tapiscia occidentalis	Sp nov	valid	Manchester	Middle Eocene	Clarno Formation	USA; Oregon	A tapisciaceous species	
Tenuisperma	Gen et sp nov	valid	Manchester	Middle Eocene	Clarno Formation	USA; Oregon	A seed of uncertain placement. Type species T. ellipticum	
Tiffneycarpa	Gen et sp nov	valid	Manchester	Middle Eocene	Clarno Formation	USA; Oregon	A seed of uncertain placement. Type species T. scleroidea	
Tinomiscoidea occidentalis	Sp nov	valid	Manchester	Middle Eocene	Clarno Formation	USA; Oregon	A moonseed species	
Tinospora elongata	Sp nov	valid	Manchester	Middle Eocene	Clarno Formation	USA; Oregon	A moonseed species	
Thanikaimonia	Gen et sp nov	valid	Manchester	Middle Eocene	Clarno Formation	USA; Oregon	A moonseed genus. Type species T. geniculata.	
Tinospora hardmanae	Sp nov	valid	Manchester	Middle Eocene	Clarno Formation	USA; Oregon	A moonseed species	
Trema nucilecta	Sp nov	valid	Manchester	Middle Eocene	Clarno Formation	USA; Oregon	A cannabaceous species	
Trigonostela	Gen et sp nov	valid	Manchester	Middle Eocene	Clarno Formation	USA; Oregon	A seed of uncertain placement. Type species T. oregonensis	
Tripartisemen	Gen et sp nov	valid	Manchester	Middle Eocene	Clarno Formation	USA; Oregon	A seed of uncertain placement. Type species T. bonesii	
Triplascapha	Gen et sp nov	valid	Manchester	Middle Eocene	Clarno Formation	USA; Oregon	A seed of uncertain placement. Type species T. collinsonae	
Triplexivalva	Gen et sp nov	valid	Manchester	Middle Eocene	Clarno Formation	USA; Oregon	A seed of uncertain placement. Type species T. rugata	
Trisepticarpium	Gen et sp nov	valid	Manchester	Middle Eocene	Clarno Formation	USA; Oregon	A seed of uncertain placement. Type species T. minutum	
Truncatisemen	Gen et sp nov	valid	Manchester	Middle Eocene	Clarno Formation	USA; Oregon	A seed of uncertain placement. Type species T. sapotoides	
Ulospermum	Gen et sp nov	valid	Manchester	Middle Eocene	Clarno Formation	USA; Oregon	A seed of uncertain placement. Type species U. hardingae	
Wheelera	Gen et sp nov	valid	Manchester	Middle Eocene	Clarno Formation	USA; Oregon	A seed of uncertain placement. Type species W. lignicrusta	
Vitis tiffneyi	Sp nov	valid	Manchester	Middle Eocene	Clarno Formation	USA; Oregon	A vitaceous species	

== Arthropods ==
=== Insects ===
Name	Novelty	Status	Authors	Age	Unit	Location	Notes	Images
Acanthognathus poinari	Sp nov	Valid	Baroni Urbani & De Andrade	Burdigalian	Dominican amber	Dominican Republic	first fossil Acanthognathus species	
Aeshna andancensis	Sp nov	Valid	Nel & Brisac	Turolian	Montagne d'Andance	France	An Aeshna dragonfly	Aeshna andancensis
Aeshna cerdanica	Sp nov	Valid	Nel & Martínez-Delclòs	Vallesian	Bellver de Cerdanya	Spain	An Aeshna dragonfly	Aeshna cerdanica
Aeschnophlebia miocenica	Sp nov	Valid	Nel & Escuillé	Turolian	Montagne d'Andance	France	An Aeschnophlebia dragonfly	Aeschnophlebia miocenica
Anochetus ambiguus	Sp nov	Valid	De Andrade	Burdigalian	Dominican amber	Dominican Republic	A ponerin ant	Anochetus ambiguus
Anochetus conisquamis	Sp nov	Valid	De Andrade	Burdigalian	Dominican amber	Dominican Republic	A ponerin ant	Anochetus conisquamis
Anochetus dubius	Sp nov	Valid	De Andrade	Burdigalian	Dominican amber	Dominican Republic	A ponerin ant	Anochetus dubius
Anochetus exstinctus	Sp nov	Valid	De Andrade	Burdigalian	Dominican amber	Dominican Republic	A ponerin ant	Anochetus exstinctus
Anochetus intermedius	Sp nov	Valid	De Andrade	Burdigalian	Dominican amber	Dominican Republic	A ponerin ant	Anochetus intermedius
Anochetus lucidus	Sp nov	Valid	De Andrade	Burdigalian	Dominican amber	Dominican Republic	A ponerin ant	Anochetus lucidus
Calopteryx andancensis	Sp nov	Valid	Nel & Brisac	Turolian	Montagne d'Andance	France	A Calopteryx damselfly	Calopteryx andancensis
Dlusskyidris	Gen et comb nov.	Valid	Bolton	Santonian	Taimyr amber	Russia	A Sphecomyrminae ant. a new genus for Palaeomyrmex zherichini Dlussky 1975.	Palaeomyrmex zherichini
Forficula paleoligura	Sp nov	Valid	Nel, Albouy, Caussanel, & Jamet	Oligocene		France	An earwig	Forficula paleoligura
Odontomachus pseudobauri	Sp nov.	Valid	De Andrade	Burdigalian	Dominican Amber	Dominican Republic	A myrmicin ant	Odontomachus pseudobauri
Odontomachus spinifer	Sp nov.	Valid	De Andrade	Burdigalian	Dominican Amber	Dominican Republic	A myrmicin ant	Odontomachus spinifer
Protoaristenymphes	Gen et sp nov	Valid	Nel & Henrotay	Toarcian		Luxembourg	A Mesochrysopid lacewing, type species P. bascharagensis	Protoaristenymphes bascharagensis
Sympecma incerta	Comb. nov	Valid	Piton	Piacenzian	Lake Chambon	France	A Lestid damselfly, new combination for Lestes incertus	Sympecma incerta

=== Trilobites ===
Name	Novelty	Status	Authors	Age	Type locality	Country	Notes	Images
Parabouleia eldredgei	Sp nov	Valid	Edgecombe, Vaccari & Waisfeld	Early Devonian	Talacasto Formation	Argentina	A calmoniid	
Talacastops	Gen et sp nov	Valid	Edgecombe, Vaccari & Waisfeld	Early Devonian	Talacasto Formation	Argentina	A calmoniid, type species is T. zarelae	

== Molluscs ==
=== Bivalves ===
Name	Novelty	Status	Authors	Age	Unit	Location	Notes	Images
Fordilla germanica	sp nov	Valid	Elicki	Early Cambrian	Zwetau Formation	Germany	early Cambrian bivalve species	

== Fishes ==
=== Newly named bony fishes ===
Name	Novelty	Status	Authors	Age	Unit	Location	Notes	Images
Megalocoelacanthus	Gen. et sp. nov	valid	Schwimmer, Stewart & Williams	late Santonian to mid-Campanian	Blufftown Formation; Niobrara Formation	United States	A latimeriid coelacanth. The type species is M. dobiei.	

== Archosauromorphs ==
- Aff. Rebbachisaurus gastroliths documented.
- The "Talkeetna Mountains Hadrosaur" specimen was discovered in a quarry being excavated for road material. The quarry is near the Glenn Highway, approximately 150 miles northeast of Anchorage. That fall, excavation began, and was resumed in the summer of 1996.

=== Newly named pseudosuchians ===
Name	Novelty	Status	Authors	Age	Unit	Location	Notes	Images
Galtonia	Gen et sp nov	Valid	Hunt & Lucas	Late Triassic (late Carnian)	New Oxford Formation	United States	A relative of Revueltosaurus.	
Pekinosaurus	Gen et sp nov	Junior synonym	Hunt & Lucas	Late Triassic (late Carnian)	Cumnock Formation	United States	A junior synonym of Revueltosaurus.	

=== Newly named basal dinosauromorphs ===
Name	Novelty	Status	Authors	Age	Unit	Location	Notes	Images
Marasuchus	Gen et comb nov	Valid	Sereno & Arcucci	Middle Triassic (Ladinian)	Chañares Formation	Argentina	A basal dinosauriform; new genus for "Lagosuchus" liloensis Romer (1972).	Marasuchus liloenisis

=== Newly named dinosaurs ===
Data courtesy of George Olshevsky's dinosaur genera list.

Name	Novelty	Status	Authors	Age	Unit	Location	Notes	Images
Afrovenator	Gen et sp nov	Valid	Sereno, Wilson, Larsson, Dutheil, & Sues		Tiourarén Formation	Niger		Afrovenator abakensis
Alwalkeria	Gen et comb nov	Valid	Chatterjee & Creisler		Maleri Formation	India		Alwalkeria
Alxasaurus	Gen et sp nov	Valid	Russell & Dong			Mongolia		Alxasaurus
“Amphicoelicaudia”		nomen nudum	Cheng			China	described as Huabeisaurus allocotus in 2000	Huabeisaurus allocotus
Caenagnathasia	Gen et sp nov	Valid	Currie, Godfrey, & Nesov	Turonian - Coniacian	Bissekty Formation	Uzbekistan		Caenagnathasia martinsoni
Cryolophosaurus	Gen et sp nov	Valid	Hammer & Hickerson	Pliensbachian	Hanson Formation	Ross Dependency		Cryolophosaurus
Koparion	Gen et sp nov	Valid	Chure	Kimmeridgian	Morrison Formation	USA (Utah)		
Monolophosaurus	Gen et sp nov	Valid	Zhao & Currie	Bathonian - Callovian	Shishugou Formation	China		Monolophosaurus jiangi
Mymoorapelta	Gen et sp nov	Valid	Kirkland & Carpenter	Kimmeridgian - Tithonian	Morrison Formation	USA (Colorado)		Mymoorapelta maysi
Pelecanimimus	Gen et sp nov	Valid	Perez-Moreno, Sanz, Buscalioni, Moratalla, Ortega, & Rasskin-Gutman	Barremian	Calizas de La Huérguina Formation	Spain		Pelecanimimus
Phuwiangosaurus	Gen et sp nov	Valid	Martin, Buffetaut, & Suteethorn	Valanginian - Hauterivian	Sao Khua Formation	Thailand		Phuwiangosaurus
Sinornithoides	Gen et sp nov	Valid	Russell & Dong	Aptian - Albian	Ejinhoro Formation	China		Sinornithoides youngi
Sinraptor	Gen et sp nov	Valid	Currie & Zhao	Late Jurassic	Shishugou Formation	China		Sinraptor dongi
Timimus	Gen et sp nov	Valid	Rich & Vickers-Rich	Albian	Eumeralla Formation	Australia		Timimus hermani
“Tonouchisaurus”		nomen nudum	Barsbold		early Cretaceous	Mongolia		
Yingshanosaurus	Gen et sp nov	Valid	Zhou	Kimmeridgian	Shaximiao Formation	China		

=== Birds ===
Name	Status	Novelty	Authors	Age	Unit	Location	Notes	Images
Berruornis	Valid	Gen et sp nov.	Mourer-Chauviré	Late Paleocene		France	A Strigidae. Type species B. orbisantiqui	
Bubo osvaldoi	Valid	Sp. nov.	Arredondo & Olson	?Pleistocene	Cave deposits	Cuba	A Strigidae.	
Falco duboisi	Valid	Sp. nov.	Cowles	Holocene	Cave deposits	Réunion	A Falconidae.	
Mascarenachen	jr synonym	Gen et sp nov.	Cowles	Holocene	Réunion	Réunion	An Anatidae, type species M. kervazoi; The species was transferred to Alopochen in 1999.	
Mascarenotus grucheti	Valid	Sp. nov.	Mourer-Chauviré, Bour, Moutou, & Ribes	Holocene		Réunion	A Strigidae.	
Messelastur	Valid	Gen et sp nov.	Peters	Middle Eocene	Messel Formation	Germany; Hessen	A Messelasturidae, Type species M. gratulator.	
Microcarbo serventyorum	Valid	Sp. nov.	van Tets	Holocene	peat swamp	Australia; Western Australia	A Phalacrocoracidae.	
Neuquenornis	Valid	Gen. nov. et Sp. nov.	Chiappe & Calvo	Santonian-Coniacian	Rio Colorado Formation	Argentina	An Avisauridae, Type species N. volans.	
Nycticorax borbonensis	jr synonym	Sp. nov.	Cowles	Holocene		Réunion	An Ardeidae, junior synonym of Nycticorax duboisi.	
Otogornis	Valid	Gen et sp nov.	Hou	Early Cretaceous		China; Inner Mongolia	A Longirostravidae, type species O. genghisi.	
Presbyornis isoni	Valid	Sp. nov.	Olson	Late Paleocene	Aquia Formation	USA; Maryland	A Presbyornithidae	
Puffinus spelaeus	Valid	Sp. nov.	Holdaway & Worthy	Late Quaternary	South Island, cave deposits	New Zealand	A Procellariidae.	
Stephanoaetus mahery	Valid	Sp. nov.	Goodman	Holocene. (Subrecent)	Madagascar	Madagascar	An Accipitridae.	
Wanshuina	Valid	Gen et sp nov.	Hou	Paleocene	Doumu Formation	China	A Rallidae, type species W. lii	

== Plesiosaurs ==
- Plesiosaur gastroliths documented.

=== New taxa ===
Name	Status	Authors	Notes
Morturneria	Valid	Chatterjee Creisler	

== Pterosaurs ==
=== New taxa ===
Name	Status	Authors	Age	Unit	Location	Notes	Images
Arthurdactylus	Valid	Frey Martill	Early Cretaceous (late Aptian/early Albian)	Crato Formation	Brazil	A pteranodontoid pterosaur.	
Montanazhdarcho	Valid	Padian, K., Horner de Ricqlès, A.J.	Late Cretaceous (Judithian)	Two Medicine Formation	United States	An azhdarchid from Montana.	
"Wyomingopteryx"	nomen nudum	Bakker	Late Jurassic (Kimmeridgian-Tithonian)	Morrison Formation	United States		
Zhejiangopterus	Valid	Cai, Z. Wei, F.	Late Cretaceous (early Campanian)	Tangshang Formation	China	A Chinese azhdarchid.	Zhejiangopterus

== Other diapsids ==
=== New taxa ===
Name	Status	Authors		Age	Unit	Location	Notes
Lucianosaurus	Valid Non-Dinosaurian Taxon	Hunt	S. G. Lucas	Late Triassic (Norian)	Bull Canyon Formation	United States	
Tecovasaurus	Valid Non-Dinosaurian Taxon	Hunt	S. G. Lucas	Late Triassic (late Carnian)	Tecovas Formation	United States	

== Synapsids ==
=== Newly named mammals ===
Name	Novelty	Status	Authors	Age	Unit	Location	Notes	Images
Microparamys paisi	Sp nov	Jr synonym	Estravís	Early Eocene	Silveirinha Formation	Portugal	An ischyromyid rodent, reassigned to the genus Corbarimys in 1999	
