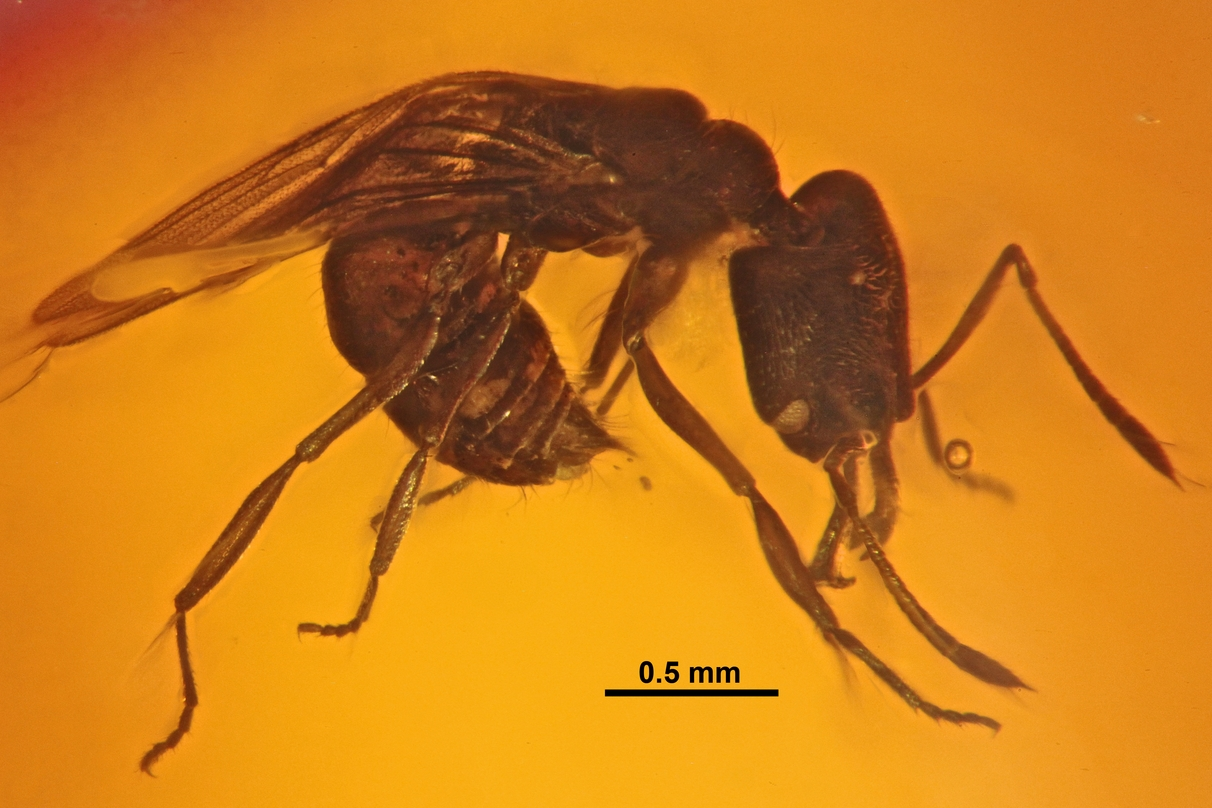
- Anochetus corayi holotype

Scientific classification
- Kingdom: Animalia
- Phylum: Arthropoda
- Clade: Pancrustacea
- Class: Insecta
- Order: Hymenoptera
- Family: Formicidae
- Genus: Anochetus
- Species: †A. corayi

Binomial name
- †Anochetus corayi Baroni Urbani, 1980

= Anochetus corayi =

Anochetus corayi Temporal range: Burdigalian?

Extinct species of ant

Anochetus corayi is an extinct species of ant in the subfamily Ponerinae known from one possibly Miocene fossil found on Hispaniola. A. corayi is one of eight species in the ant genus Anochetus to have been described from fossils found in Dominican amber and is one of a number of Anochetus species found in the Greater Antillies.

== History and classification ==
Anochetus corayi is known from a solitary fossil insect which is an inclusion in a transparent yellow chunk of Dominican amber. The amber was produced by the extinct Hymenaea protera, which formerly grew on Hispaniola, across northern South America and up to southern Mexico. The specimen was collected from an unspecified amber mine in fossil bearing rocks of the Cordillera Septentrional mountains of northern Dominican Republic. Associated fossil foraminifera date the amber from at least the Burdigalian stage of the Miocene, the associated fossil coccoliths may be as old as the Middle Eocene. This age range is due to the host rock being secondary deposits for the amber, and the Miocene the age range is only the youngest that it might be.

At the time of description, the holotype specimen was preserved in the State Museum of Natural History Stuttgart amber collections in Baden-Württemberg, Germany. The holotype fossil was first studied by entomologist Cesare Baroni Urbani of the University of Basle with his 1980 type description of the new species being published in the journal Stuttgarter Beiträge zur Naturkunde. Serie B (Geologie und Paläontologie). The specific epithet corayi is a patronym honoring Mr Armin Coray in recognition of the illustration work he provided for the type description and a number of other amber fossils.

Anochetus corayi is one of eight Anochetus which have been described from Dominican amber and was the first of those species to be described. The second fossil species to be described was A. brevidentatus in 1991. The remaining six species; A. ambiguus, A. conisquamis, A. dubius, A. exstinctus, A. intermedius, and A. lucidus were all described by De Andrade in the a large 1994 paper on Dominican amber Odontomachiti fossils. A number of modern species live in the Greater Antilles, with at least three modern species found on Hispaniola.

== Description ==
The Anochetus corayi type specimen is a small and well preserved alate female. The specimen has an estimated body length of 3.4 millimetres (0.13 in), with a 0.60 millimetres (0.024 in) long head and 0.40 millimetres (0.016 in) long mandibles. The overall coloration of the species is a chestnut brown, with the slightly lighter coxae and gaster, while the wings have dark brown veins and pterostigma and an overall uniform brownish membrane. The mandibles are generally short and notably thick with a flare in width from the base to tips and have a strong convex curvature to them. The apical teeth on each mandible blade are slightly shorter than the ventral teeth. Both the mesonotum and pronotum show a nearly flat upper surface area and the widest point of the trunk is at the propodeum. The propodeum sports two short, obtuse, spines on the rear edge, while the petiole has a single longer spine centrally placed which is anteroventrally compressed.
