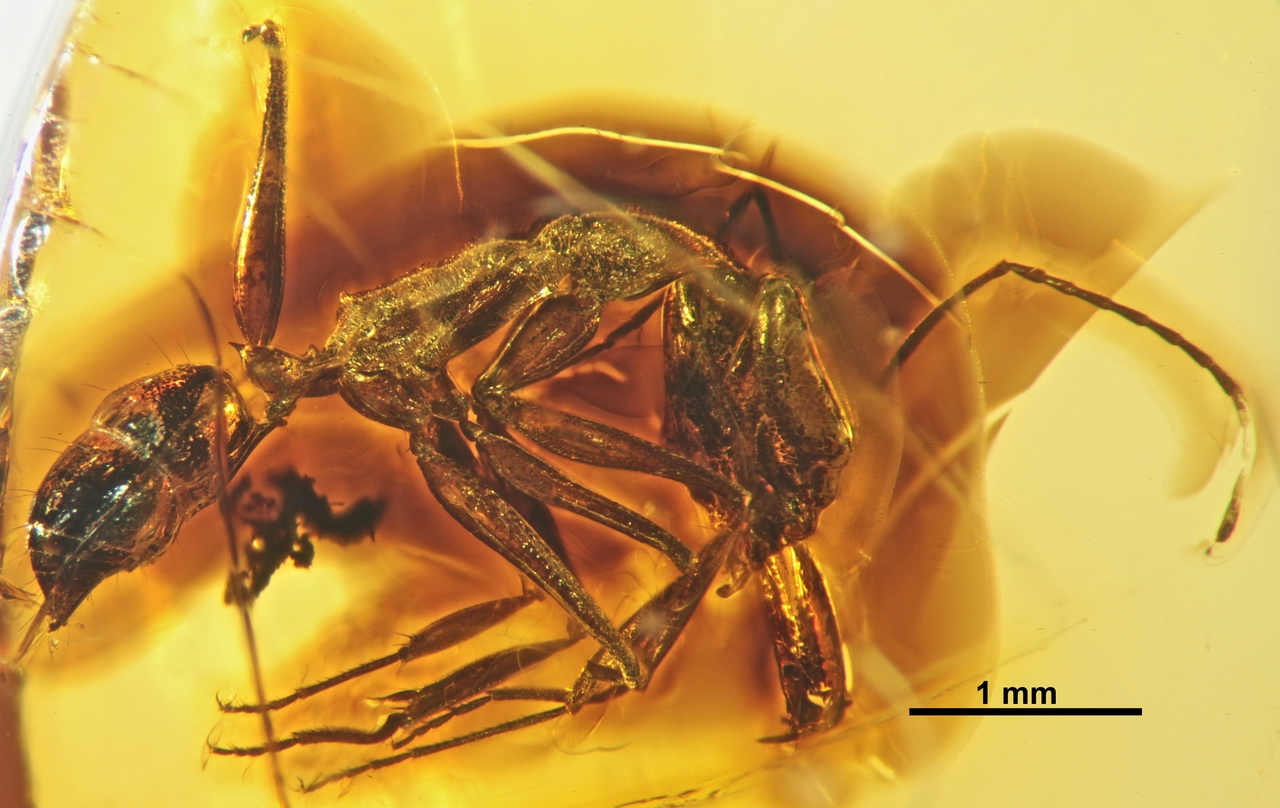
- Anochetus dubius holotype

Scientific classification
- Kingdom: Animalia
- Phylum: Arthropoda
- Clade: Pancrustacea
- Class: Insecta
- Order: Hymenoptera
- Family: Formicidae
- Genus: Anochetus
- Species: †A. dubius

Binomial name
- †Anochetus dubius De Andrade, 1994

= Anochetus dubius =

Anochetus dubius Temporal range: Burdigalian?

Extinct species of ant

Anochetus dubius is an extinct species of ant in the subfamily Ponerinae known from two possibly Miocene fossils found on Hispaniola. A. dubius is one of eight species in the ant genus Anochetus to have been described from fossils found in Dominican amber and is one of a number of Anochetus species found in the Greater Antilles.

== History and classification ==
Anochetus dubius is known from the solitary fossil insect which, along with two soil particles, is an inclusion in a transparent yellow chunk of Dominican amber. The amber was produced by the extinct Hymenaea protera, which formerly grew on Hispaniola, across northern South America, and up to southern Mexico. The specimen was collected from an undetermined amber mine in fossil-bearing rocks of the Cordillera Septentrional mountains of northern Dominican Republic. The amber dates from at least the Burdigalian stage of the Miocene, based on studying the associated fossil foraminifera, and may be as old as the Middle Eocene, based on the associated fossil coccoliths. This age range is due to the host rock being secondary deposits for the amber, and the Miocene as the age range is only the youngest that it might be.

At the time of description, the holotype specimen, number "Do-4192", was preserved in the State Museum of Natural History Stuttgart amber collections in Baden-Württemberg, Germany. The holotype fossil was first studied by entomologist Maria L. De Andrade of the University of Basle with her 1991 type description of the new species being published in the journal Stuttgarter Beiträge zur Naturkunde. Serie B (Geologie und Paläontologie). The specific epithet dubius is derived from the Latin dubius meaning "doubtful", a reference to the uncertain affinities to any specific modern Anochetus species group.

The species is one of eight Anochetus which have been described from Dominican amber. Two species were described prior to A. dubius: A. corayi in 1980 and A. brevidentatus in 1991. The remaining five species—A. ambiguus, A. conisquamis, A. exstinctus, A. intermedius, and A. lucidus—were all described by De Andrade in the same 1994 paper as A. dubius. A number of modern species live in the Greater Antilles, with at least three modern species found on Hispaniola.

== Description ==
The Anochetus dubius type specimen is well preserved, though it is missing some body structures such as both hind tarsi and tibiae, and the entire specimen is surrounded by a brownish bacterial growth. The specimen has an estimated body length of 5.25 millimetres (0.207 in), with a 1.12-millimetre-long (0.044 in) head and 0.88-millimetre-long (0.035 in) mandibles. The overall coloration of the body is a brown darkening on the head ad gaster, with the coxae and portions of the trochanters and femora being a reddish tone. The mandibles are just under the width of the head and about one-quarter the length, flare in width from the base to tips, and have between them ten teeth which decrease in size from the tips to the bases. The apical three teeth on each mandible blade are elongated and slender for grasping prey, with the apical two teeth longer than the third tooth. Both the mesonotum and pronotum have a slight U-shaped profile, with the undersides of each curved upwards. The propodium sports short spines, 0.04 millimetres (0.0016 in) long, on the rear edge, while the petiole has two longer spines, 0.10 millimetres (0.0039 in) long, placed near the center of the petiolar node.
