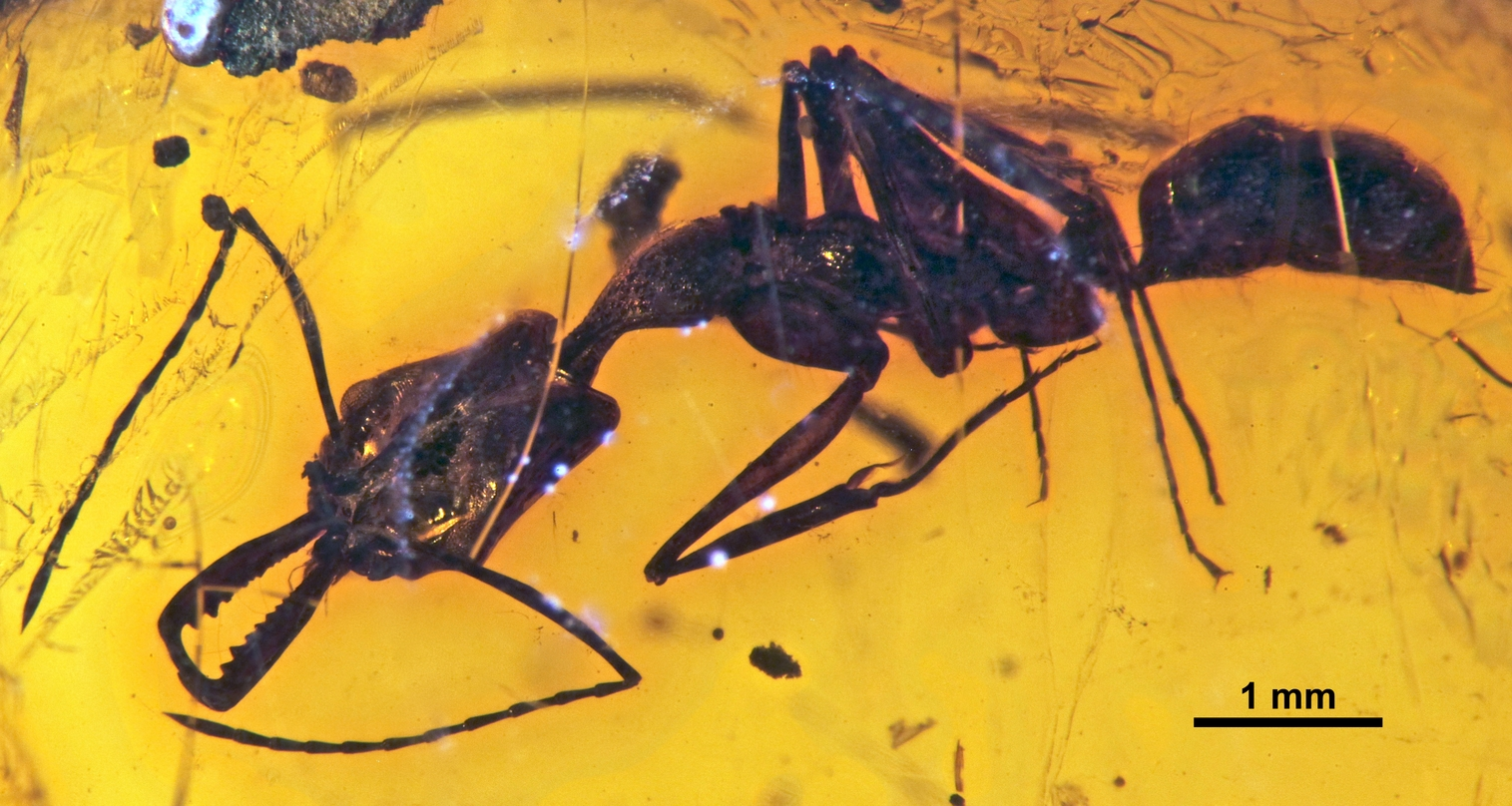
- Anochetus exstinctus holotype

Scientific classification
- Kingdom: Animalia
- Phylum: Arthropoda
- Clade: Pancrustacea
- Class: Insecta
- Order: Hymenoptera
- Family: Formicidae
- Genus: Anochetus
- Species: †A. exstinctus

Binomial name
- †Anochetus exstinctus De Andrade, 1994

= Anochetus exstinctus =

Anochetus exstinctus Temporal range: Burdigalian?

Extinct species of ant

Anochetus exstinctus is an extinct species of ant in the subfamily Ponerinae known from two possibly Miocene fossils found on Hispaniola. A. exstinctus is one of eight species in the ant genus Anochetus to have been described from fossils found in Dominican amber and is one of a number of Anochetus species found in the Greater Antillies.

== History and classification ==
Anochetus exstinctus is known from three solitary fossil insects, which are inclusions in yellow transparent chunks of Dominican amber. The amber was produced by the extinct Hymenaea protera, which formerly grew on Hispaniola, across northern South America and up to southern Mexico. The specimens were collected from an undetermined amber mine in fossil-bearing rocks of the Cordillera Septentrional mountains, northern Dominican Republic. The amber dates from at least the Burdigalian stage of the Miocene, based on studying the associated fossil foraminifera, and may be as old as the Middle Eocene, based on the associated fossil coccoliths. This age range is due to the host rock being secondary deposits for the amber, and the Miocene age range is only the youngest that it might be.

At the time of description, the holotype specimen, number D-5479, and the paratype, number D-3734, were preserved in the State Museum of Natural History Stuttgart amber collections. A third fossil was identified from a photograph as most likely belonging to the species but unavailable for study. The holotype and paratype fossils were first studied by entomologist Maria L. De Andrade of the University of Basle, with her 1994 type description of the new species being published in the journal Stuttgarter Beiträge zur Naturkunde. Serie B (Geologie und Paläontologie). The specific epithet is derived from the Latin exstinctus, which means "extinct".

The species is one of eight Anochetus species which have been described from Dominican amber. Two species were described prior to A. exstinctus, A. corayi in 1980 and A. brevidentatus in 1991. The remaining five species, A. ambiguus, A. conisquamis, A. dubius, A. intermedius, and A. lucidus, were all described by De Andrade in the same 1994 paper as A. exstinctus. A number of modern species live in the Greater Antilles, with at least three modern species found on Hispaniola.

== Description ==
Both the Anochetus exstinctus type specimens are well preserved, though the paratype is missing some body structures, including the apical portion of the right antenna and portions of all three right legs. The specimens have a body length between 7.0 and 7.48 millimetres (0.276 and 0.294 in), with a 1.44–1.48 millimetres (0.057–0.058 in) long head and 1.08–1.16 millimetres (0.043–0.046 in) long mandibles. The overall coloration of the body is brown, with the coxae and portions of the trochanters and femora being a reddish tone. The mandibles are just under the width of the head and about two-thirds the length, flare in width from the base to tips, and have between twelve and thirteen teeth which decrease in size from the tips to the bases. The apical three teeth on each mandible blade are elongated and slender for grasping prey, with the apical two teeth longer than the third tooth. Both the mesonotum and pronotum have a slight "u"-shaped profile, with the undersides of each curved upwards. The propodium sports short spines, 0.08 millimetres (0.0031 in) long, on the rear edge, while the petiole has two longer spines, 0.12 millimetres (0.0047 in) placed near the center of the petiolar node.
