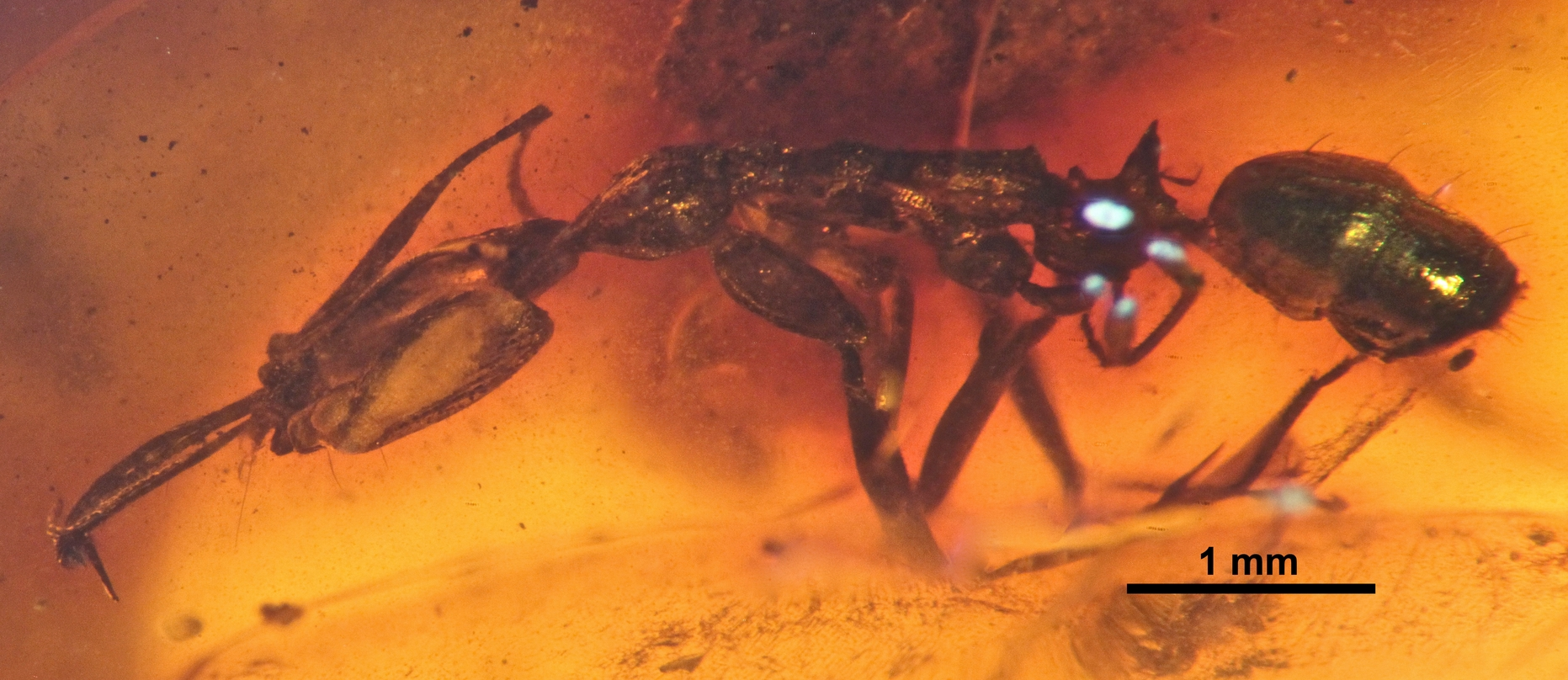
- Anochetus ambiguus paratype

Scientific classification
- Kingdom: Animalia
- Phylum: Arthropoda
- Clade: Pancrustacea
- Class: Insecta
- Order: Hymenoptera
- Family: Formicidae
- Genus: Anochetus
- Species: †A. ambiguus

Binomial name
- †Anochetus ambiguus De Andrade, 1994

= Anochetus ambiguus =

Anochetus ambiguus Temporal range: Burdigalian?

Extinct species of ant

Anochetus ambiguus is an extinct species of ant in the subfamily Ponerinae known from two possibly Miocene fossils found on Hispaniola. A. ambiguus is one of eight species in the ant genus Anochetus to have been described from fossils found in Dominican amber and is one of a number of Anochetus species found in the Greater Antillies.

== History and classification ==
Anochetus ambiguus is known from two solitary fossil insects which, are inclusions in dark yellow transparent chunks of Dominican amber. The amber was produced by the extinct Hymenaea protera, which formerly grew on Hispaniola, across northern South America and up to southern Mexico. The specimens were collected from an undetermined amber mine in fossil bearing rocks of the Cordillera Septentrional mountains, northern Dominican Republic. The amber dates from at least the Burdigalian stage of the Miocene, based on studying the associated fossil foraminifera and may be as old as the Middle Eocene, based on the associated fossil coccoliths. This age range is due to the host rock being secondary deposits for the amber, and the Miocene the age range is only the youngest that it might be.

At the time of description, the holotype specimen, number D-3346, and the paratype, number D-4015, were preserved in the State Museum of Natural History Stuttgart amber collections. The fossils were first studied by entomologist Maria L. De Andrade of the University of Basle with her 1994 type description of the new species being published in the journal Stuttgarter Beiträge zur Naturkunde. Serie B (Geologie und Paläontologie). The specific epithet ambiguus is derived from the Latin ambiguus which mean "uncertain or variable".

The species is one of eight Anochetus species which have been described from Dominican amber. Two species were described prior to A. ambiguus, A. corayi in 1980 and A. brevidentatus in 1991. The remaining five species; A. conisquamis, A. dubius, A. exstinctus, A. intermedius, and A. lucidus were all described by De Andrade in the same 1994 paper as A. ambiguus. A number of modern species live in the Greater Antilles, with at least three modern species found on Hispaniola.

== Description ==
The Anochetus ambiguus specimens are well preserved, though the paratype shows some distortion from the amber moving after entombment and both are missing some body structures. The specimens have estimated body lengths between 5.62–5.94 millimetres (0.221–0.234 in). The overall coloration of A. ambiguus is a brown to dark brown, with femora, petiole, and trochanters a reddish tone. The mandibles are just under one-third the length of the head, flare in width from the base to tips and have between 7 and 9 teeth which decrease in size from the tips to the bases. The apical three teeth on each mandible blade are elongated and slender for grasping prey. Both the mesonotum and pronotum have a slight "u" shaped profile, with the undersides of each curved upwards. The propodium sports short spines, 0.04 millimetres (0.0016 in) long, on the rear edge, while the petiole has longer spines centrally placed and reaching 0.10 millimetres (0.0039 in) in length.
