= Anochetus brevidentatus =

Anochetus brevidentatus Temporal range: Burdigalian?

Scientific classification
- Kingdom: Animalia
- Phylum: Arthropoda
- Clade: Pancrustacea
- Class: Insecta
- Order: Hymenoptera
- Family: Formicidae
- Genus: Anochetus
- Species: †A. brevidentatus

Binomial name
- †Anochetus brevidentatus MacKay, 1991

Extinct species of ant

Anochetus brevidentatus is an extinct species of ant in the subfamily Ponerinae known from two possibly Miocene fossils found on Hispaniola. A. ambiguus is one of eight species in the ant genus Anochetus to have been described from fossils found in Dominican amber and is one of a number of Anochetus species found in the Greater Antillies.

== History and classification ==
Anochetus brevidentatus is known from two solitary fossil insects which are inclusions in transparent chunks of Dominican amber. The amber was produced by the extinct Hymenaea protera, which formerly grew on Hispaniola, across northern South America, and up to southern Mexico. The type specimen was collected from the La Toca Mine near las Aguitas, while the second specimen is from an undetermined amber mine. Both are from fossil bearing rocks of the Cordillera Septentrional mountains in the northern Dominican Republic. The amber dates from at least the Burdigalian stage of the Miocene, based on studying the associated fossil foraminifera and may be as old as the Middle Eocene, based on the associated fossil coccoliths. This age range is due to the host rock being secondary deposits for the amber, and the Miocene age range is only the youngest that it might be.

At the time of description, the holotype specimen was preserved in the Museum of Comparative Zoology at Harvard University. The holotype fossil was first studied by entomologist William MacKay with his 1991 type description of the new species being published in the Journal of the New York Entomological Society. The specific epithet brevidentatus is derived Latin as a reference to the short length of the spines on the petiole. The second known specimen was identified by entomologist Maria L. De Andrade of the University of Basle from a specimen in the State Museum of Natural History Stuttgart amber collections and briefly described in 1994.

A. brevidentatus is one of eight Anochetus species which have been described from Dominican amber. One species, A. corayi, was published earlier than A. brevidentatus, being described in 1980. The remaining six species; A. ambiguus, A. conisquamis, A. dubius, A. exstinctus, A. intermedius, and A. lucidus were all described by De Andrade in the same 1994 paper. A number of modern species live in the Greater Antilles, with at least three modern species found on Hispaniola.

== Description ==
The Anochetus ambiguus type specimen is well preserved, though it shows some distortion from the amber moving after entombment and is missing some body structures. The second specimen has an estimated body length of 6.0 millimetres (0.24 in). The mesosoma has distinct fine striae covering most of its surface and the gaster is smooth and shiny. The upper side of the head, mandibles, pronotum, and gaster sport sparse erect hairs. The mandibles have a flare in width near the center of their length and sport between 9 and 10 teeth with the apical three teeth on each mandible blade elongated and slender for grasping prey. The propodium sports short spines on the rear edge, while the petiole two spines which angle vertically up from the petiole face.
