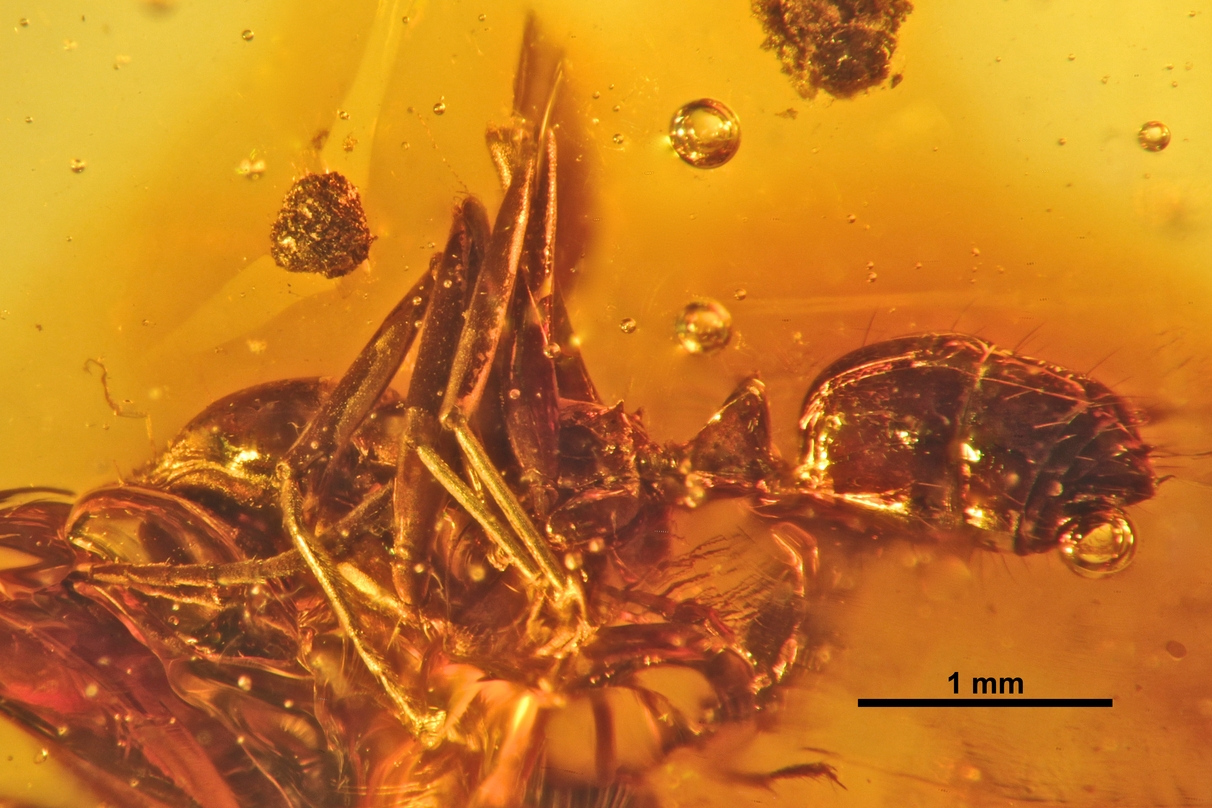
- Anochetus lucidus holotype

Scientific classification
- Kingdom: Animalia
- Phylum: Arthropoda
- Clade: Pancrustacea
- Class: Insecta
- Order: Hymenoptera
- Family: Formicidae
- Genus: Anochetus
- Species: †A. lucidus

Binomial name
- †Anochetus lucidus De Andrade, 1994

= Anochetus lucidus =

Anochetus lucidus Temporal range: Burdigalian?

Extinct species of ant

Anochetus lucidus is an extinct species of ant in the subfamily Ponerinae known from two possibly Miocene fossils found on Hispaniola. A. lucidus is one of eight species in the ant genus Anochetus to have been described from fossils found in Dominican amber and is one of a number of Anochetus species found in the Greater Antilles.

== History and classification ==
Anochetus lucidus is known from just two fossil insects, which were inclusions in a single yellow transparent chunk of Dominican amber, which was cut into two pieces for the study of the fossils. The amber was produced by the extinct Hymenaea protera, which formerly grew on Hispaniola, across northern South America and up to southern Mexico. The specimens were collected from an undetermined amber mine in fossil bearing rocks of the Cordillera Septentrional mountains, northern Dominican Republic. The amber dates from at least the Burdigalian stage of the Miocene, based on studying the associated fossil foraminifera and may be as old as the Middle Eocene, based on the associated fossil coccoliths. This age range is due to the host rock being secondary deposits for the amber, and the Miocene the age range is only the youngest that it might be.

At the time of description, the holotype specimen, number D-2846-1, and the paratype, number D-2846-2, were preserved in the State Museum of Natural History Stuttgart amber collections. The fossils were first studied by entomologist Maria L. De Andrade of the University of Basle with her 1994 type description of the new species being published in the journal Stuttgarter Beiträge zur Naturkunde. Serie B (Geologie und Paläontologie). The specific epithet is derived from the Latin lucidus which mean "shining" in reference to the distinct shining nature of the exoskeleton.

The species is one of eight Anochetus species which have been described from Dominican amber. Two species were described prior to A. lucidus, A. corayi in 1980 and A. brevidentatus in 1991. The remaining five species; A. ambiguus, A. conisquamis, A. dubius, A. exstinctus, and A. intermedius were all described by De Andrade in the same 1994 paper as A. lucidus. A number of modern species live in the Greater Antilles, with at least three modern species found on Hispaniola.

== Description ==
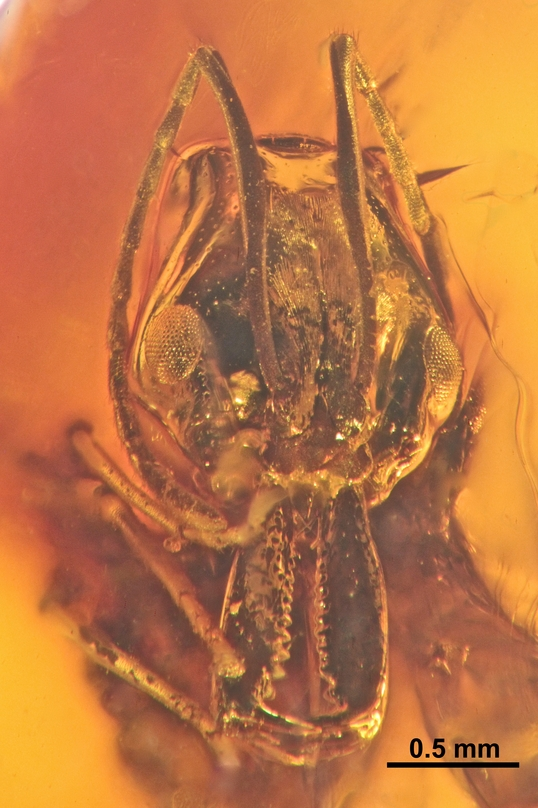
A. lucidus head

The Anochetus lucidus type specimens are well preserved. Portions of the legs from a possible third specimen are also present in the amber. The species has an estimated body length of between 5.72–5.88 millimetres (0.225–0.231 in), with a 1.28–1.32 millimetres (0.050–0.052 in) long head and 0.96–1.00 millimetre (0.038–0.039 in) long mandibles. The overall coloration of the body is a reddish-brown with the legs and trunk shading into a chestnut brown and all of the exoskeletal integument being distinctly shiny. The mandibles are shorter than the width of the head, with the mandible blades being distinctly broad and having fifteen teeth on each blade, which decrease in size from the tips to the bases. The apical three teeth on each mandible blade are elongated and slender for grasping prey. Both the mesonotum and pronotum have a slight "u" shaped profile, with the undersides of each curved upwards. The propodium sports well developed spines, 0.08 millimetres (0.0031 in) long while the petiole has short spines that are centrally placed.
