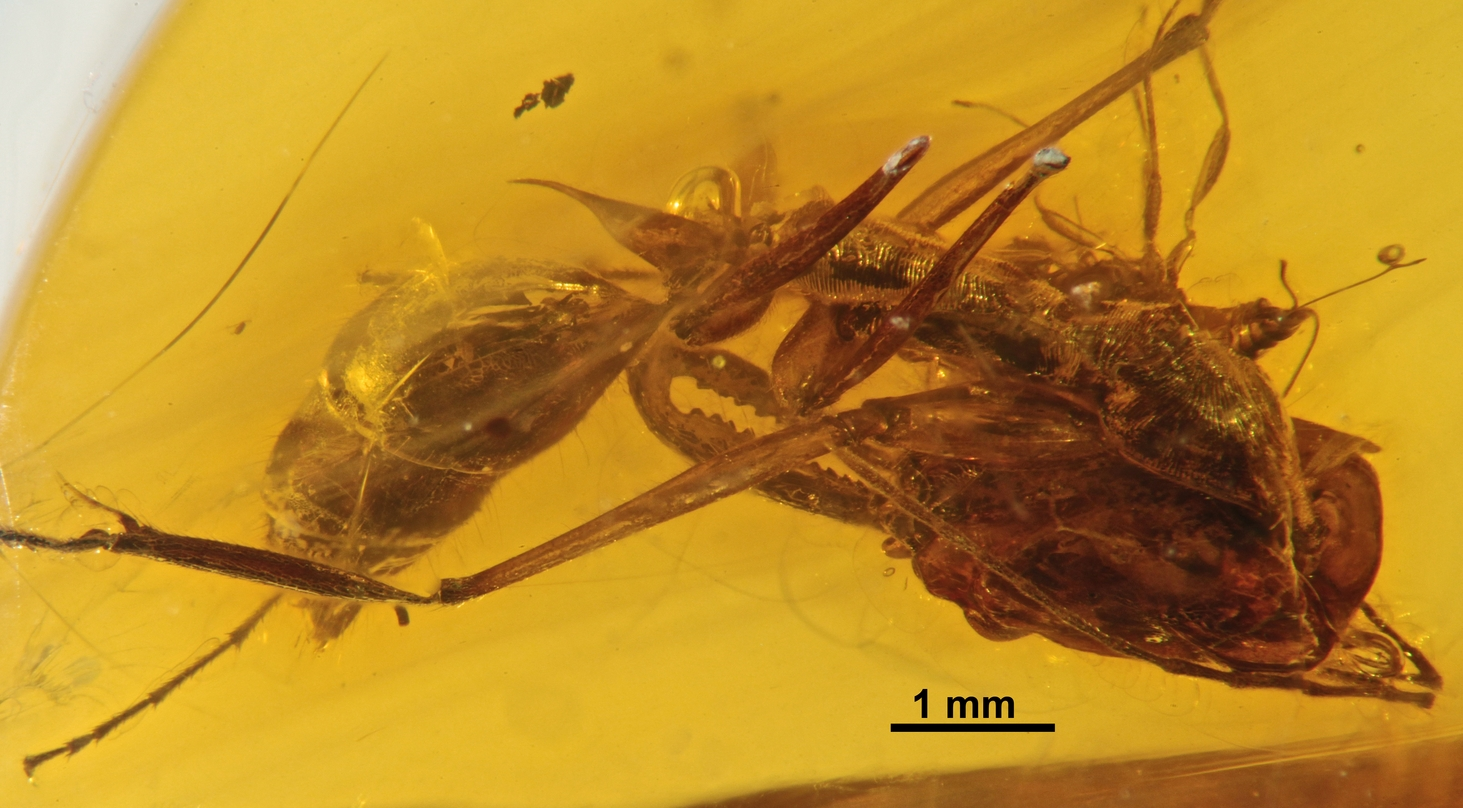
- Odontomachus spinifer holotype

Scientific classification
- Kingdom: Animalia
- Phylum: Arthropoda
- Clade: Pancrustacea
- Class: Insecta
- Order: Hymenoptera
- Family: Formicidae
- Genus: Odontomachus
- Species: †O. spinifer

Binomial name
- †Odontomachus spinifer De Andrade, 1994

= Odontomachus spinifer =

Odontomachus spinifer Temporal range: Burdigalian?

Extinct species of ant

Odontomachus spinifer is an extinct species of ant in the subfamily Ponerinae known from one possibly Miocene fossil found on Hispaniola. O. spinifer is one of two species in the ant genus Odontomachus to have been described from fossils found in Dominican amber and is one of a number of Odontomachus species found in the Greater Antilles.

== History and classification ==
Odontomachus spinifer is known from a solitary fossil insect which, along with a microhymenopteran, is an inclusion in a transparent yellow chunk of Dominican amber. The amber was produced by the extinct Hymenaea protera, which formerly grew on Hispaniola, across northern South America, and up to southern Mexico. The specimen was collected from an undetermined amber mine in fossil-bearing rocks of the Cordillera Septentrional mountains of northern Dominican Republic. The amber dates from at least the Burdigalian stage of the Miocene, based on studying the associated fossil foraminifera, and may be as old as the Middle Eocene, based on the associated fossil coccoliths. This age range is due to the host rock being secondary deposits for the amber, and the Miocene as the age range is only the youngest that it might be.

At the time of description, the holotype specimen, number "Do-2215", was preserved in the State Museum of Natural History Stuttgart amber collections in Baden-Württemberg, Germany. The holotype fossil was first studied by entomologist Maria L. De Andrade of the University of Basle with her 1994 type description of the new species being published in the journal Stuttgarter Beiträge zur Naturkunde. Serie B (Geologie und Paläontologie). The specific epithet spinifer is derived from the Latin word which means "bearing a spine", a reference to the large projection on the top of the petiole.

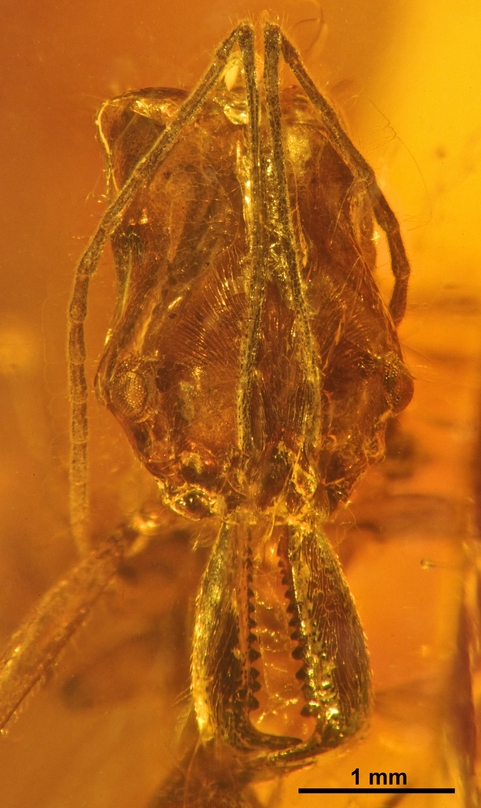
The O. spinifer holotype head

Based on the head structure, O. spinifer was suggested to be part of the O. haematodus species group, closely placed with the species O. affinis, O. mayi, and O. panamensis. The three modern species are from Brazil and Guyana up through Panama and Costa Rica. The two modern species found on the island of Hispaniola, O. bauri and O. insularis are not closely placed to O. spinifer, having different structuring of the heads upper surface. When first described, O. spinifer was one of two Odontomachus species that had been described from fossils. It and Odontomachus pseudobauri were both described by De Andrade from Dominican amber in the same paper. A third species Odontomachus paleomyagra, the first compression fossil species, was described in 2014 from a worker found in Priabonian age lignite deposits of the Most Basin, Czech Republic.

== Description ==
The O. spinifer worker is approximately 11.08 mm (0.44 in) in length, and has a shining exoskeleton of yellowish red to reddish brown tones. The smooth exoskeleton has tiny punctuation found across the top of the head, mandibles, petiole node and the gaster. In contrast the frons, antennae depressions, pronotum, mesonotum and underside of the petiole are distinguished by varying degrees of striation. The head is large with a rectangular outline, being two-thirds longer than wide, with the rear margin of the head wider than the maximum width of the pronotum. The mandibles are almost as long as the head is wide and the chewing margin has twelve teeth increasing in size towards the tip, while the apex of each has three teeth, a preapical, intercalary, and an apical tooth. The antennae have notably long scapes that extend past the rear margin of the head capsule and curve slightly along their length. The first funicular segments of the antennae are double the length of the second segment and longer than any of the other 10 segments. The mesonotum and propodeum have an elongated slender profile, as does the petiole, while the gaster is bell shaped along the connection with the petiole and the sting is partially retracted. There is a notably large backward curving spine formed from the upper surface of the petiole, being longer than the width of the petiole.
