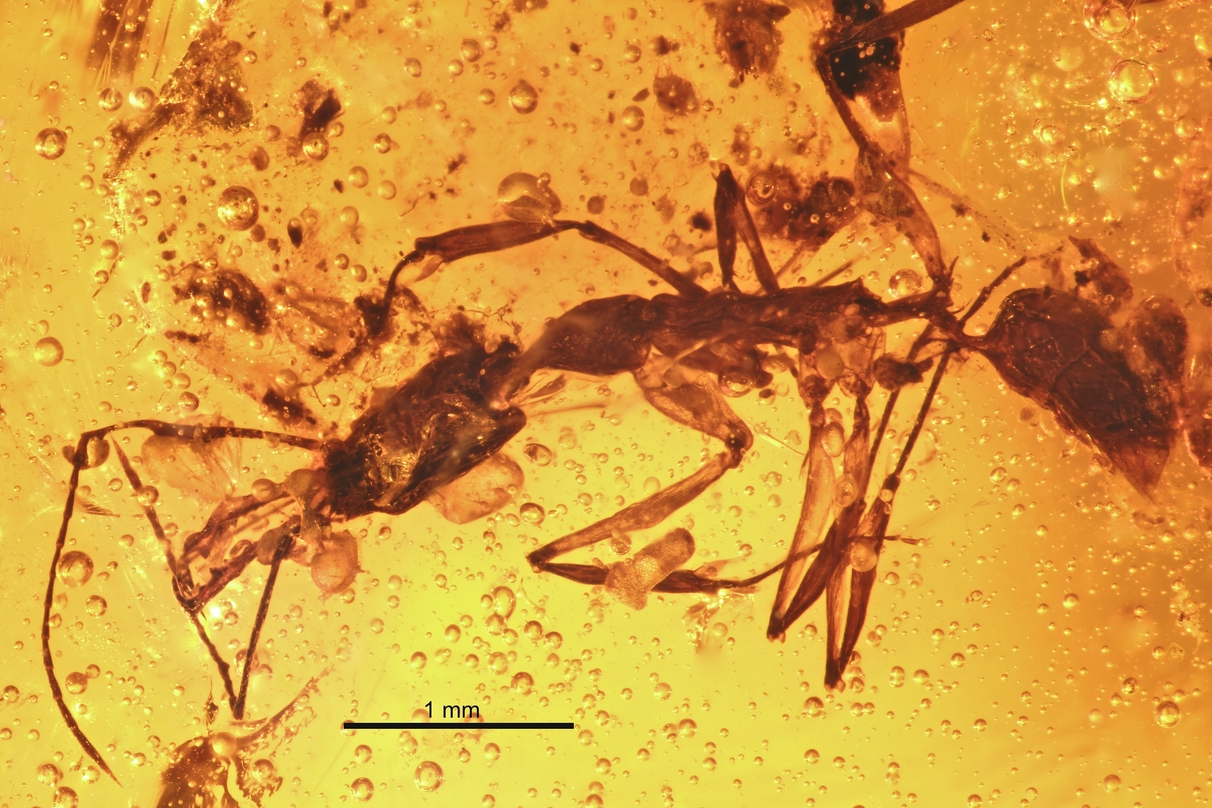
- Anochetus intermedius holotype

Scientific classification
- Kingdom: Animalia
- Phylum: Arthropoda
- Clade: Pancrustacea
- Class: Insecta
- Order: Hymenoptera
- Family: Formicidae
- Genus: Anochetus
- Species: †A. intermedius

Binomial name
- †Anochetus intermedius De Andrade, 1994

= Anochetus intermedius =

Anochetus intermedius Temporal range: Burdigalian?

Extinct species of ant

Anochetus intermedius is an extinct species of ant in the subfamily Ponerinae known from two possibly Miocene fossils found on Hispaniola. A. intermedius is one of eight species in the ant genus Anochetus to have been described from fossils found in Dominican amber and is one of a number of Anochetus species found in the Greater Antilles.

== History and classification ==
Anochetus intermedius is known from a solitary fossil insect which, along with two flies, three other ants, and two springtails, is an inclusion in a transparent yellow chunk of Dominican amber. The amber was produced by the extinct Hymenaea protera, which formerly grew on Hispaniola, across northern South America and up to southern Mexico. The specimen was collected from an undetermined amber mine in fossil bearing rocks of the Cordillera Septentrional mountains of northern Dominican Republic. The amber dates from at least the Burdigalian stage of the Miocene, based on studying the associated fossil foraminifera and may be as old as the Middle Eocene, based on the associated fossil coccoliths. This age range is due to the host rock being secondary deposits for the amber, and the Miocene the age range is only the youngest that it might be.

At the time of description, the holotype specimen was preserved in the Natural History Museum, London amber collections in London, England. The holotype fossil was first studied by entomologist Maria L. De Andrade of the University of Basle with her 1991 type description of the new species being published in the journal Stuttgarter Beiträge zur Naturkunde. Serie B (Geologie und Paläontologie). The specific epithet is derived from the Latin intermedius meaning "intermediate".

The species is one of eight Anochetus which have been described from Dominican amber. Two species were described prior to A. intermedius, A. corayi in 1980 and A. brevidentatus in 1991. The remaining five species; A. ambiguus, A. conisquamis, A. dubius, A. exstinctus, and A. lucidus were all described by De Andrade in the same 1994 paper as A. intermedius. A number of modern species live in the Greater Antilles, with at least three modern species found on Hispaniola.

== Description ==
The Anochetus intermedius type specimen is fairly well preserved, though some body structures were lost prior to entombment and the specimen shows distortions along its full length from the resin flowing after entombment. The specimen has an estimated body length of 4.56 millimetres (0.180 in), with a 0.80 millimetres (0.031 in) long head and 0.84 millimetres (0.033 in) long mandibles. The overall coloration of the body is a chestnut-yellow, with the coxae, femora, trochanters and mandible blades a yellowish tone, while the head, mandible tips, antennae, tibiae and tarsi are all brownish. The mandibles are one quarter times longer than the width of the head and just over the length, slightly flaring in width from the base to tips and have seven teeth on the left mandible, eight teeth on the right, all of which decrease in size from the tips to the bases. The apical three teeth on each mandible blade are elongated and slender for grasping prey. Both the mesonotum and pronotum have a slight "u" shaped profile, with the undersides of each curved upwards. The propodium sports short spines, 0.04 millimetres (0.0016 in) long, on the rear edge, while the petiole has longer spines, 0.12 millimetres (0.0047 in), centrally placed.
