= Syndesus ambericus =

Syndesus ambericus Temporal range: Burdigalian?

Scientific classification
- Kingdom: Animalia
- Phylum: Arthropoda
- Clade: Pancrustacea
- Class: Insecta
- Order: Coleoptera
- Suborder: Polyphaga
- Infraorder: Scarabaeiformia
- Family: Lucanidae
- Genus: Syndesus
- Species: †S. ambericus

Binomial name
- †Syndesus ambericus Woodruff, 2009

Species of beetle

Syndesus ambericus is an extinct species of stag beetles in the subfamily Syndesinae known from a single possibly Miocene fossil found on Hispaniola. S. ambericus is the first species of stag beetle to have been described from fossils found in Dominican amber and is one of four species from amber, and the only stag beetle species known from the Caribbean.

== History and classification ==
Syndesus ambericus is known from a single fossil insect which is an inclusion in a transparent chunk of Dominican amber. The amber was produced by the extinct Hymenaea protera, which formerly grew on Hispaniola, across northern South America and up to southern Mexico. The fossil was first noted as interesting in 1983 in a private amber collection in the Dominican Republic. It was subsequently reported as an unidentified lucanid in a 1992 paper. Between the first examination in 1983 and reexamination of the fossil in 1998 the fossil was broken and subsequently repaired. The holotype amber specimen, number 502873, is currently housed in the Department of Paleobiology in the National Museum of Natural History in Washington, D.C. The holotype fossil is composed of a complete adult individual that was collected from an amber mine, possibly the Palo Quemado mine, in fossil bearing rocks of the Cordillera Septentrional mountains, northern Dominican Republic. The amber dates from at least the Burdigalian stage of the Miocene, based on studying the associated fossil foraminifera and may be as old as the Middle Eocene, based on the associated fossil coccoliths. This age range due to the host rock being secondary deposits for the amber and the Miocene the age range is only the youngest that it might be. The fossil was examined by entomologist Robert E. Woodruff of the Florida State Collection of Arthropods. Woodruff's 2009 type description of the new species was published in the entomology systematics journal Insecta Mundi. The specific epithet ambericus is in recognition of the amber mining company Amberica, which has helped to bring notable amber fossils to the attention of paleontologists.

== Description ==
The Syndesus ambericus holotype is a male with a total length of 13 millimetres (0.51 in) and a height of 4 millimetres (0.16 in) and having an overall convex, cylindrical shaped body. The coloration of S. ambericus is not described in the type description, and only a mention of golden colored hairs along the fore-wing margins is made. The head has antennae that are composed of at least an unknown number of segments with the seven visible segments modified into a lamellate structure. The broad head sports two, nearly round, large eyes and sharp projections placed in front of them. As is typical for members for lucanids, the mandibles are highly modified into horn like structures. They are elongated to two thirds the length of the pronotum with symmetrical structure and bearing three teeth. A small projection at the front edge of the pronotum is present but not notably developed and the pronotum is lined with punctation, pits on the surface. The overall morphology is very similar to the living species Syndesus cornutus, which is native to Australia, making the placement of the species in Syndesus firm. The two species are distinguished by the mandible features, with S. cornutus having longer mandibles that have only two teeth. S. cornutus has less continuous punctures on the pronotum and a much larger projection at the front edge.
