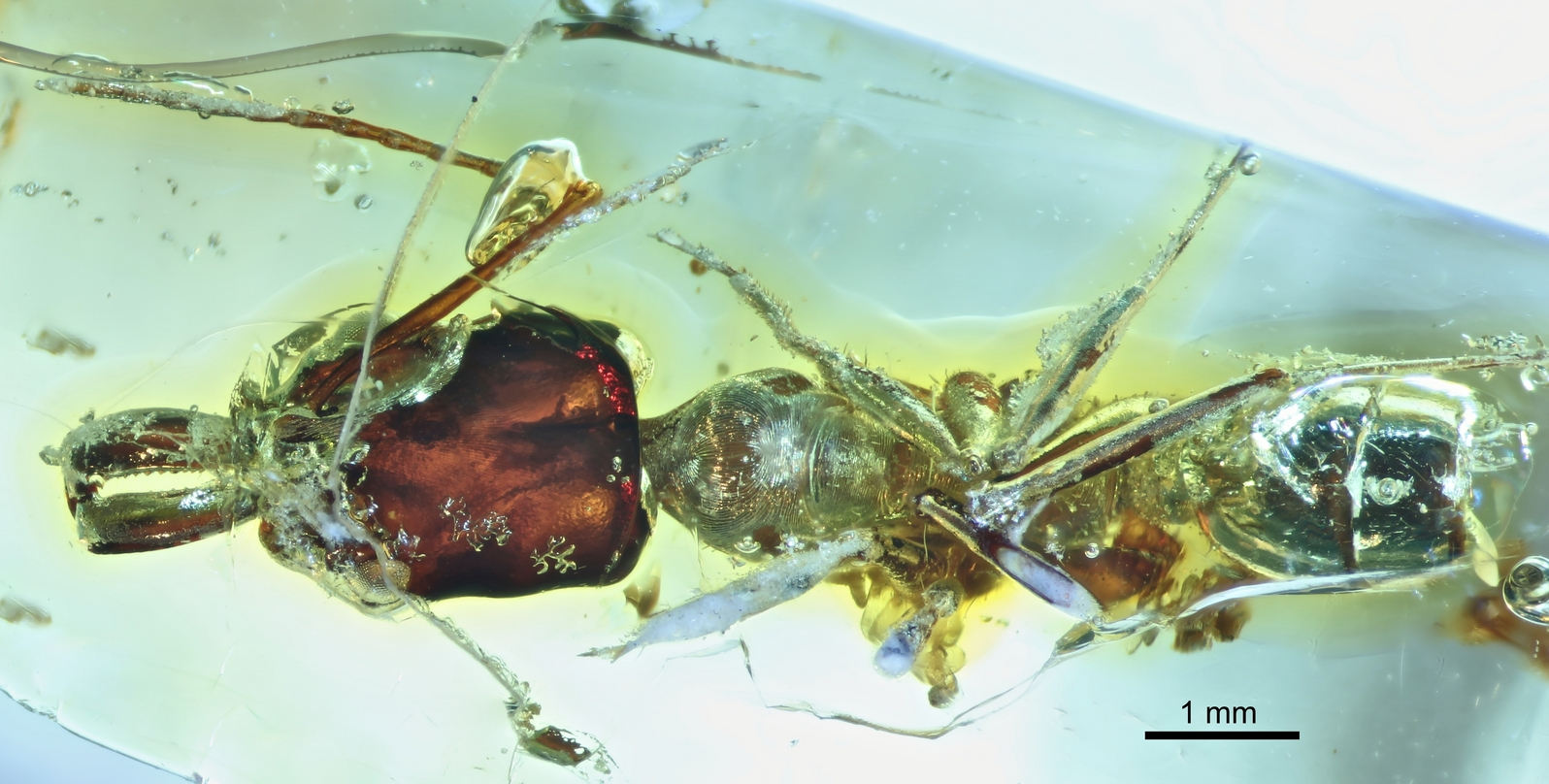
- Odontomachus pseudobauri holotype

Scientific classification
- Kingdom: Animalia
- Phylum: Arthropoda
- Clade: Pancrustacea
- Class: Insecta
- Order: Hymenoptera
- Family: Formicidae
- Genus: Odontomachus
- Species: †O. pseudobauri

Binomial name
- †Odontomachus pseudobauri De Andrade, 1994

= Odontomachus pseudobauri =

Odontomachus pseudobauri Temporal range: Burdigalian?

Extinct species of ant

Odontomachus pseudobauri is an extinct species of ant in the subfamily Ponerinae known from one possibly Miocene fossil found on Hispaniola. O. pseudobauri is one of two species in the ant genus Odontomachus to have been described from fossils found in Dominican amber and is one of a number of Odontomachus species found in the Greater Antilles.

== History and classification ==
Odontomachus pseudobauri is known from a solitary fossil insect which, along with a coleopteran and a dipteran, is an inclusion in a transparent yellow chunk of Dominican amber purchased from an amber dealer in Basel, Switzerland. The amber was produced by the extinct Hymenaea protera, which formerly grew on Hispaniola, across northern South America, and up to southern Mexico. The specimen was collected from an undetermined amber mine in fossil-bearing rocks of the Cordillera Septentrional mountains of northern Dominican Republic. The amber dates from the Burdigalian stage of the Miocene, based on studying the associated fossil foraminifera, and may be as old as the Middle Eocene, based on the associated fossil coccoliths. This age range is due to the host rock being secondary deposits for the amber, and the Miocene as the age range is only the youngest that it might be.

At the time of description, the holotype specimen, number "BMNHP-II32", was preserved in the Natural History Museum, London amber collections in London, England. The holotype fossil was first studied by entomologist Maria L. De Andrade of the University of Basle with her 1994 type description of the new species being published in the journal Stuttgarter Beiträge zur Naturkunde. Serie B (Geologie und Paläontologie). The specific epithet pseudobauri is derived from the Greek Latin word pseudo which means "false", and bauri from the modern species Odontomachus bauri.

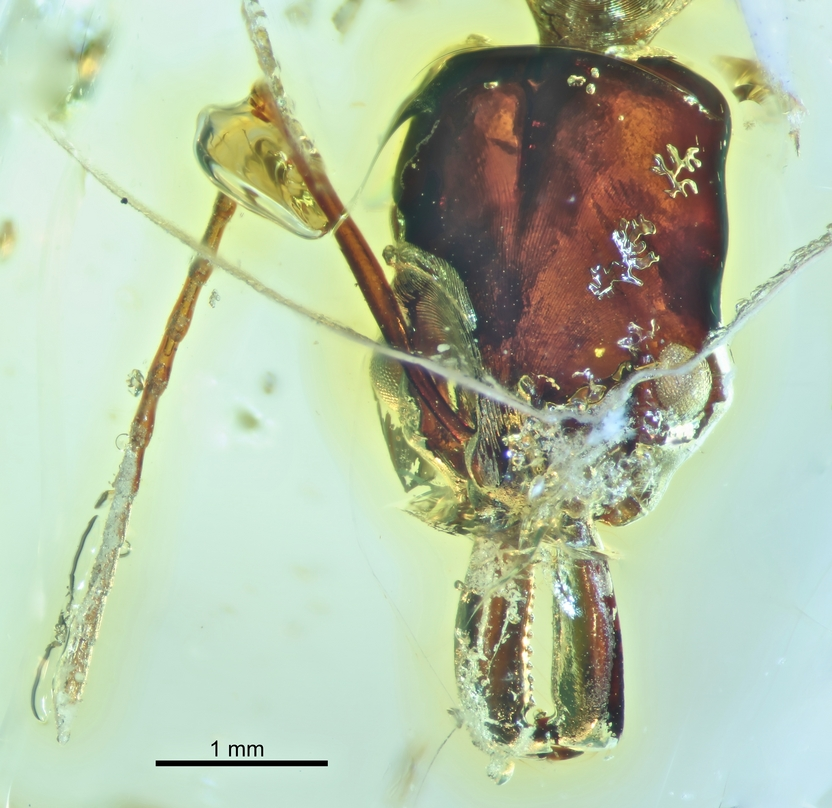
head of the O. pseudobauri holotype

Based on the head structure, O. pseudobauri was suggested to be part of the O. haematodus species group, closely placed with the species O. bauri. The modern species is found in the Galápagos Islands, tropical regions of South and Central America, and most of the West Indies except the Bahamas and Cuba. O. bauri is one of two modern species found on the island of Hispaniola, and based on the similarities to O. pseudobauri De Andrade suggested the latter species might have been ancestral to the modern species. When first described, O. pseudobauri was one of two Odontomachus species that had been described from fossils. It and Odontomachus spinifer were both described by De Andrade from Dominican amber in the same paper. A third species Odontomachus paleomyagra, the first compression fossil species, was described in 2014 from a worker found in Priabonian age lignite deposits of the Most Basin, Czech Republic.

== Description ==
The O. pseudobauri worker is approximately 9.28 mm (0.37 in) in length, and has a shining exoskeleton of orange along the body, reddish head and mandibles, and brownish tones on the gaster. The smooth exoskeleton has tiny punctuation found across the rear and sides of the head, in the front areas of the antennae depressions, and over the gaster. In contrast the frons back across the rear areas of the antennae sockets are striated, with the striae becoming finer towards the rear of the depressions. The head has a rectangular outline, being 1/3 longer than wide, with the rear margin of the head wider than the maximum width of the pronotum. The mandibles are 3/4 as long as the head is wide and the chewing margin of the right mandible having 14 teeth, while there are 13 teeth in the left. The teeth of both margins increase in size towards the tip, while the apex of each has three teeth, a preapical, intercalary, and an apical tooth. The antennae have notably long scapes that extend past the rear margin of the head capsule. The first funicular segments of the antennae are 3/4 the length of the second segment. The pronotum and propodeum each have convex upper profiles, with approximately 25 concentric striae circling the pronotum. There is a large backward curving spine formed from the upper domed surface of the petiole, being a little narrower than the width of the petiole, and a smaller process is positioned on the forward underside area of the petiole. The worker is incomplete, missing the legs and antenna of the left side plus tip sections of the right legs. The third through end segments of the gaster are shrunken and missing.
