= Blue amber =

Rare variety of amber resin with a blue color

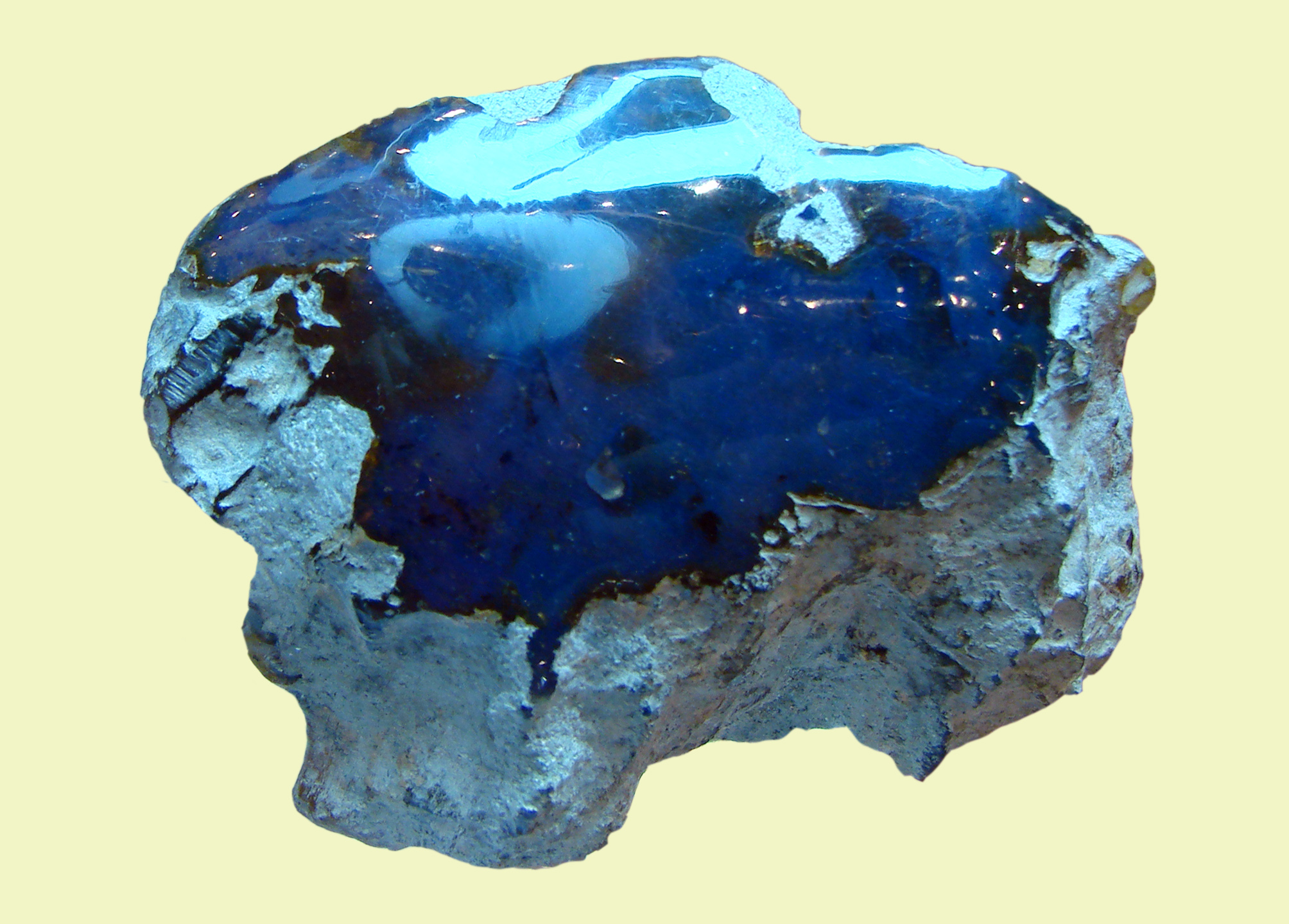
Dominican blue amber

Blue amber is a rare variety of amber resin that exhibits a blue coloration. Blue amber has been most commonly found in the Dominican Republic—especially in the amber mines around the city of Santiago and, less commonly, in the eastern half of the country. In the modern age, it was discovered at about the same time as Dominican amber.

== Causes of coloration ==
Vittorio Bellani and Enrico Giulotto at the University of Pavia, Italy, studied several amber specimens by means of optical absorption, fluorescence spectroscopy, and time-resolved fluorescence measurements. The resulting spectral analysis revealed that the emission and excitation spectra were similar in shape to those of diluted solutions of anthracene, perylene, and tetracene, and suggest that the fluorescent hydrocarbon responsible for the blueness is most likely perylene.

Despite their findings, the presence of these aromatic hydrocarbons has not been confirmed in samples of blue amber. While all types of amber tested displayed a fluorescence, blue amber fluoresced with a greater intensity, even though the absorption extinction coefficient was larger for red and yellow amber.

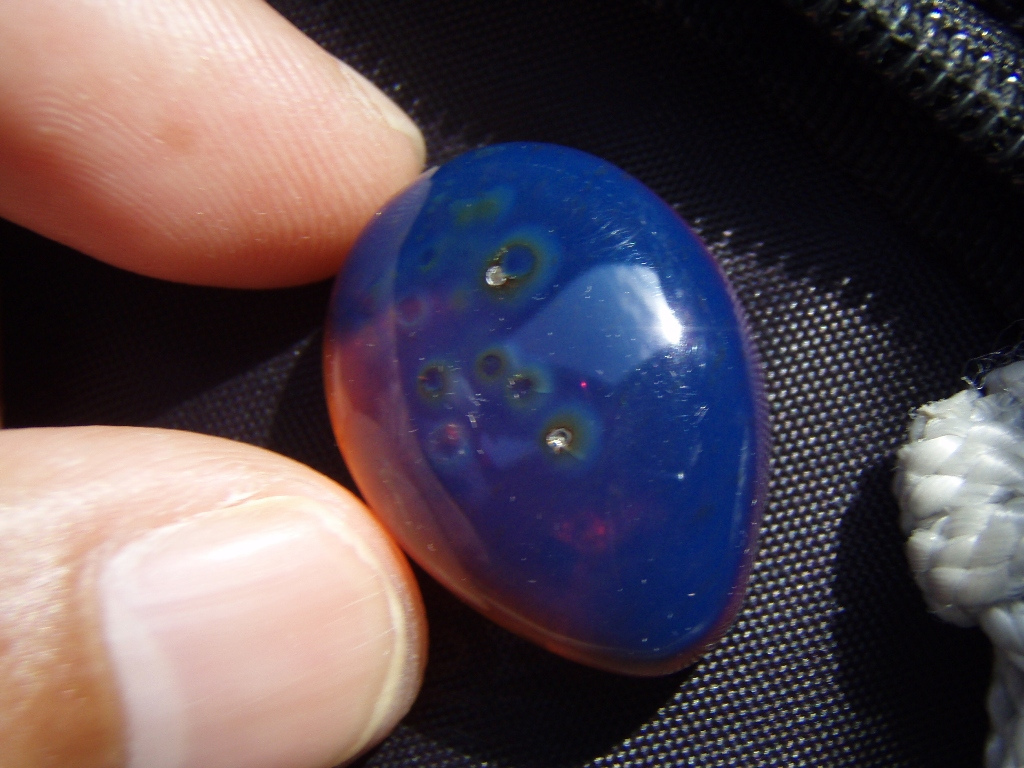
Polished blue amber under direct sunlight

Although there are several theories about the origin of Dominican blue amber, there is a great probability that it owes its existence to ingredients such as anthracene as a result of 'incomplete combustion' due to forest fires among the extinct species Hymenaea protera trees about 25 to 40 million years ago.

This effect is only possible in some specimens of Dominican amber category, in some Mexican ambers from Chiapas and some ambers from Indonesia. Any other amber (such as Baltic amber) will not display this phenomenon, because its original resin is not from the Hymenaea protera tree.

=== Appearance ===
Under artificial light, the amber appears like ordinary amber, but under sunlight it has an intense fluorescent blue glow. When held against the sun it will appear like ordinary amber, and under ultraviolet light it will glow a bright milky-blue.

Blue amber emits a very agreeable smell, which is different from regular amber when it is being cut and polished.

== See also ==
- Dominican amber
- Ammolite
- Copal
- List of minerals
