= Pico Diego de Ocampo =

Mountain in the Cordillera Septentrional in Dominican Republic

Diego de Ocampo
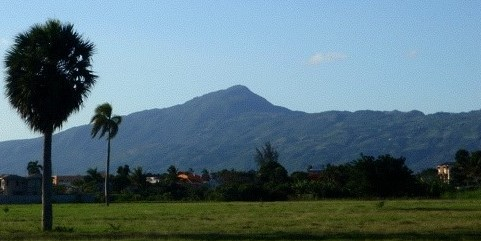
- View of the southern slope of Diego de Ocampo

Highest point
- Elevation: 1,250 m (4,100 ft)

Geography
- Location within the Dominican Republic
- Country: Dominican Republic
- Province: Santiago Province
- Range coordinates: 19°34′48″N 70°44′42″W
- Parent range: Cordillera Septentrional

Pico Diego de Ocampo is the highest point in the Cordillera Septentrional in Santiago Province, Dominican Republic.

Located north of Santiago, the peak has been called the city's main natural monument, together with the Yaque River.

== Etymology ==
This peak was named after Diego de Ocampo, a 16th-century rebel slave leader who hid away in the mountains, pillaged and sabotaged plantations in Concepción de la Vega, San Juan de la Maguana, Azua de Compostela and Bahoruco. He made a truce with the Spanish authorities, but rebelled again soon after. Later on he was captured and executed by Spanish troops, according to Governor Cerrato and the Oidor Grajeada in 1546.
