= Paleopanax =

Paleopanax Temporal range: Middle Eocene, 45–43 Mya

Scientific classification
- Kingdom: Plantae
- Clade: Tracheophytes
- Clade: Angiosperms
- Clade: Eudicots
- Clade: Asterids
- Order: Apiales
- Family: Araliaceae
- Genus: †Paleopanax; Manchester
- Species: †P. oregonensis

Binomial name
- †Paleopanax oregonensis Manchester

Extinct genus of flowering plants

Paleopanax is an extinct genus of flowering plant in the Ginseng and Ivy family, Araliaceae, containing the single species Paleopanax oregonensis. The species is solely known from the middle Eocene sediments exposed in north central Oregon and was first described from a series of isolated fossil fruits in siltstones.

== History and classification ==
Paleopanax oregonensis has been identified from a single location in the Clarno Formation, the Clarno nut beds, type locality for both the formation and the species. The nut beds are approximately 3 kilometres (1.9 mi) east of the unincorporated community of Clarno, Oregon, and currently considered to be middle Eocene in age, based on averaging zircon fission track radiometric dating which yielded an age of 43.6 and 43.7 ± 10 million years ago and argon–argon dating radiometric dating which yielded a 36.38 ± 1.31 to 46.8 ± 3.36 Mya date. The average of the dates resulted in an age range of 45 to 43 Mya. The beds are composed of silica and calcium carbonate cemented tuffaceous sandstones, siltstones, and conglomerates which preserve either a lake delta environment, or alternatively periodic floods and volcanic mudflows preserved with hot spring activity.

The genus and species was described from a series of type specimens, the holotype specimen OMSI pb810, and a pair of paratypes which are currently preserved in the paleobotanical collections of the Oregon Museum of Science and Industry in Portland, Oregon. The fossils were part of a group of approximately 20,000 specimens collected from 1942 to 1989 by Thomas Bones, A. W. Hancock, R. A. Scott, Steven R. Manchester, and a number of high school students.

The Paleopanax specimens were studied by paleobotanist Steven R. Manchester of the University of Florida. He published his 1994 type description for A. oregonensis in the Journal Palaeontographica Americana. In his type description Manchester noted the generic name is derived from the Greek word Paleo meaning "old" and Panax meaning "ginseng" in reference to the ginseng family. The specific epithet oregonensis was chosen in recognition of the state of Oregon where the fossils were found. Paleopanax and fossil leaves of the genus Dendropanax, from the Eocene of Tennessee, are considered the two oldest reliable records of Araliaceae.

== Description ==
The fruits of Paleopanax oregonensis are bilaterally symmetrical with a wide elliptical shape in face view and bicarpellate structure. The fruits have an overall length ranging between 4.5–5.6 millimetres (0.18–0.22 in) and a width between 5.4–6.6 centimetres (2.1–2.6 in). Each carpel is D-shaped in face view, with two to three arched longitudinal grooves which run across the carpel face and join at the ventral axis. The preserved pedicels are no more than 2 millimetres (0.079 in) long. The apex of the fruit sports two recurved styles which arise parallel to each other and are between 2.0–3.0 millimetres (0.079–0.118 in) long. Overall the fruit structure is very similar to those of the living Pseudopanax davidii. The two species are distinguished by the style structure, with Pseudopanax davidii having a single forked style, while Paleopanax oregonensis has two separate styles.
