= Dominican amber =

Amber from the Dominican Republic

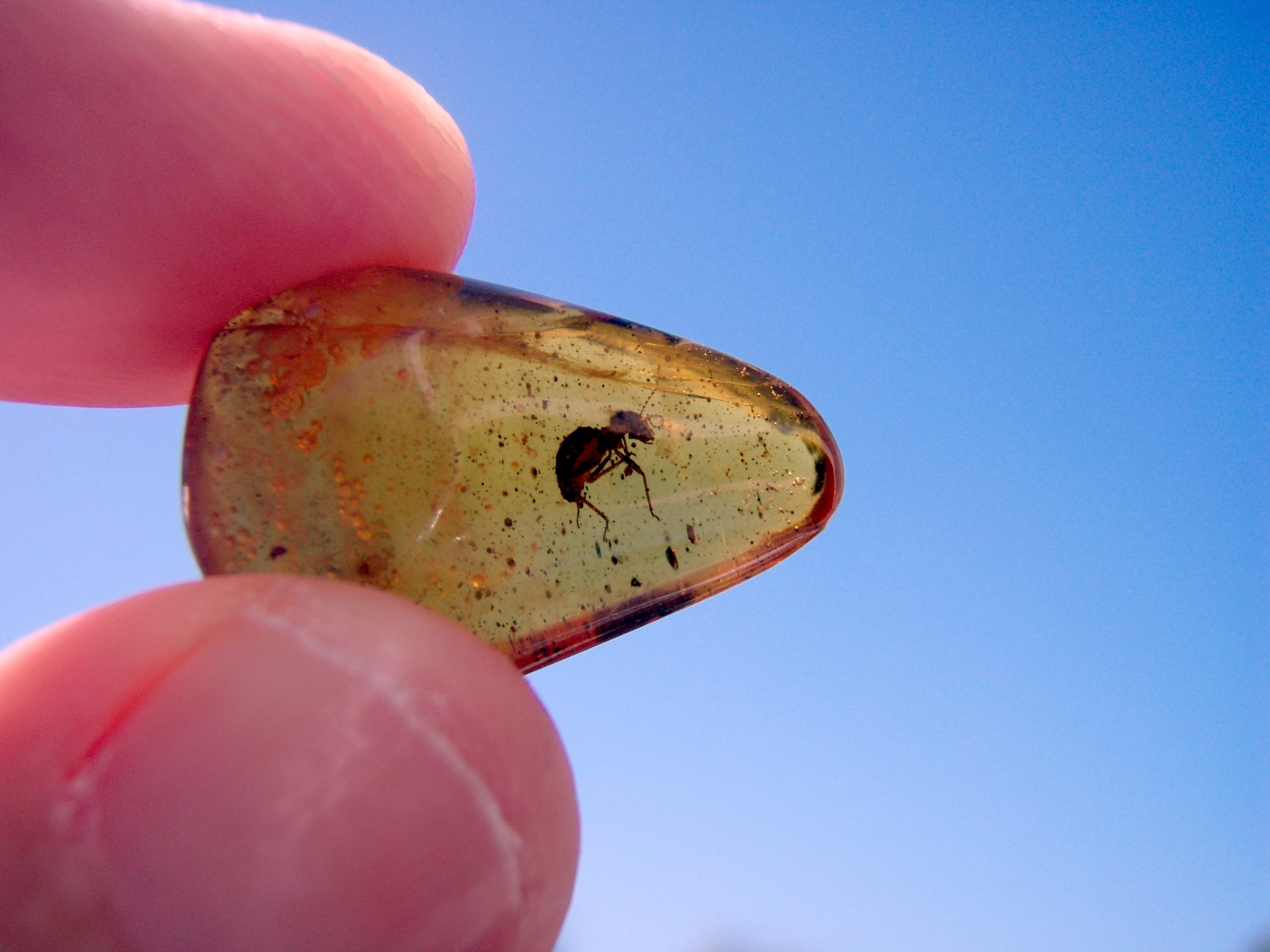
Worker termite in Dominican amber

Dominican amber is derived from resin of the extinct tree Hymenaea protera. This amber, mined in the Dominican Republic, differentiates itself from Baltic amber by being nearly always transparent, and it has a higher number of fossil inclusions. This has enabled the detailed reconstruction of the ecosystem of a long-vanished tropical forest.

== Age ==
The age of the amber has been controversial. A study in the early 1990s returned a date up to 40 million years old. However, other authors have suggested a date in the Miocene, around 20–15 million years old, based on marine microfossils found in the sediment the amber is contained in.

== Mining sites ==
There are three main sites in the Dominican Republic where amber is found: La Cordillera Septentrional, in the north, and Bayaguana and Sabana de la Mar, in the east. In the northern area, the amber-bearing unit is formed of clastic rocks, washed down with sandstone fragments and other sediments that accumulated in a deltaic environment, even in water of some depth.

In the eastern area, the amber is found in a sediment formation of organic-rich laminated sand, sandy clay, intercalated lignite, and as well as some solvated beds of gravel and calcarenite.

Both areas seem to have been part of the same sedimentary basin but were later disrupted by movements along major faults.

== Mining ==
Dominican amber, especially Dominican blue amber, is mined through bell pitting, which is extremely dangerous. The bell pit is basically a foxhole dug with whatever tools are available. Machetes do the start, some shovels, picks and hammers may participate eventually. The pit itself goes as deep or safe as possible, sometimes vertical, sometimes horizontal, but never level. It snakes into hill sides, drops away, joins up with others, goes straight up and pops out elsewhere. 'Foxhole' applies indeed: rarely are the pits large enough to stand in, and then only at the entrance. Miners crawl around on their knees using short-handled picks, shovels and machetes.

There are few to no safety measures. A pillar or so may hold back the ceiling from time to time but only if the area has previously collapsed. Candles are the only source of light. Humidity inside the mines is at 100%. Since the holes are situated high on mountainsides and deep inside said mountains, the temperature is cool and bearable, but after several hours the air becomes stale. During rain the mines are forced to close. The holes fill up quickly with water, and there is little point in pumping it out again (although sometimes this is done) because the unsecured walls may crumble.

== Export restrictions ==
The Ministry of Energy and Mining prohibited the export of raw or semi-processed amber with the goal of promoting domestic jewellery production in 2016. In 2018, the Ministry lifted most of the ban and permitted the export of 80% of Dominican amber, no matter its processing state. Since 2019, the Ministry determines the quantities of amber which may be exported, and any entity seeking to export amber from the Dominican Republic must obtain a certificate of non-objection from the Ministry.

== Variations ==
Dominican amber can be found in many colors, besides the obvious amber. Yellow and honey colored are fairly common. There is also red and green in smaller quantities and the rare blue amber (fluorescent).

The blue amber reportedly is found mostly in Palo Quemado mine south from La Cumbre.

The Museo del Ambar Dominicano, in Puerto Plata, as well as the Amber World Museum in Santo Domingo have collections of amber specimens.

== Paleobiology ==
Numerous organisms have been described from amber specimens including:

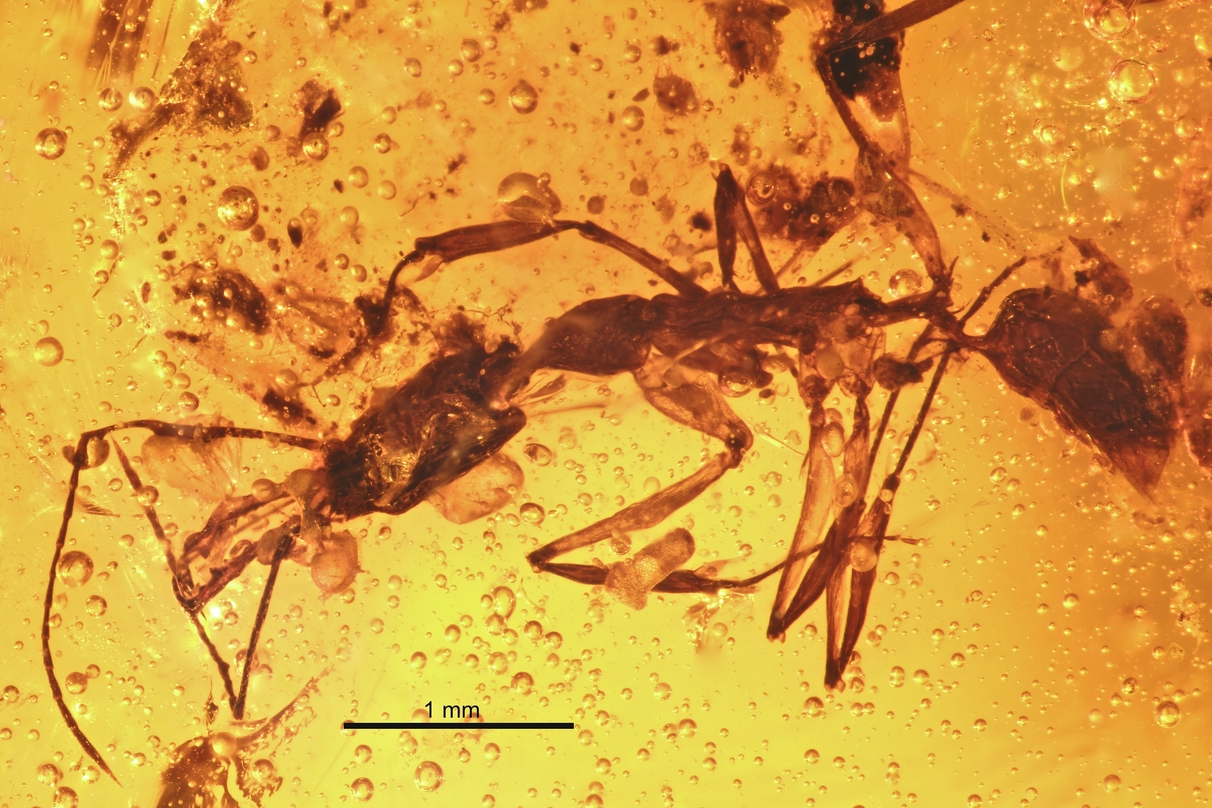
Anochetus intermedius, an ant

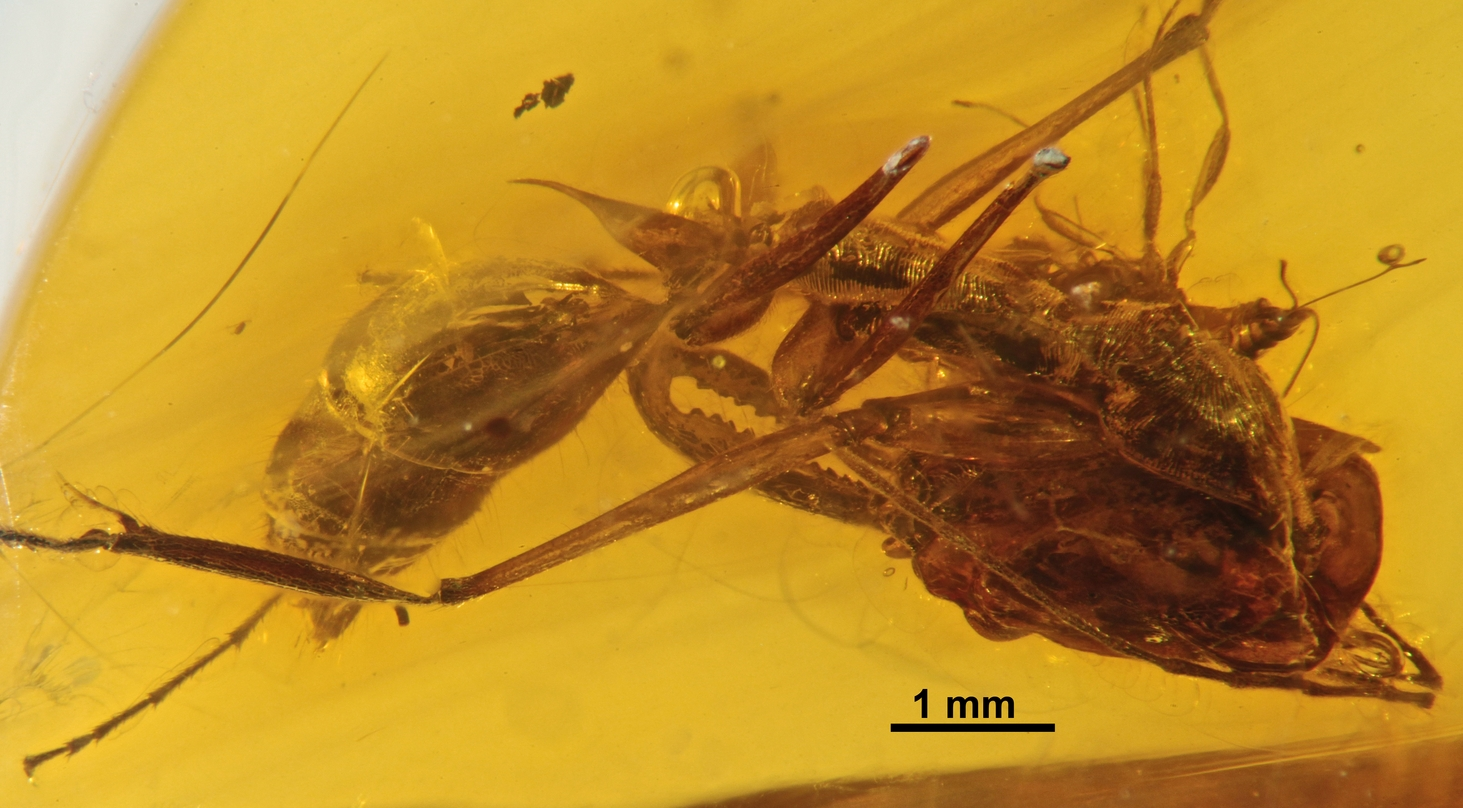
Odontomachus spinifer

=== Protozoans ===
- Paleoleishmania neotropicum
- Trypanosoma antiquus

=== Flora ===
- Discoflorus neotropicus
- Hymenaea protera
- Palaeoraphe
- Roystonea palaea

=== Funga ===
- Parmelia ambra

=== Fauna ===
- Acanthostichus hispaniolicus
- Anelaphus velteni
- Anochetus ambiguus
- Anochetus brevidentatus
- Anochetus conisquamis
- Anochetus corayi
- Anochetus dubius
- Anochetus exstinctus
- Anochetus intermedius
- Anochetus lucidus
- Apterostigma electropilosum
- Apterostigma eowilsoni
- Araneagryllus
- Augochlora leptoloba
- Azteca alpha
- Azteca eumeces
- Cephalotes jansei
- Dicromantispa electromexicana
- Dicromantispa moronei
- Eickwortapis
- Electromyrmococcus
- Elaphidion inclusum
- Elaphidion tocanum
- Formicodiplogaster myrmenema
- Leptofoenus pittfieldae
- Lutzomyia adiketis
- Neocorynura electra
- Nesagapostemon
- cf. Nesoctites
- Odontomachus pseudobauri
- Odontomachus spinifer
- Oligochlora
- Palaeoplethodon
- Paradoryphoribius
- Plectromerus grimaldii
- Plectromerus tertiarius
- Pterolophosoma otiliae
- Sphaerodactylus dommeli
- Stizocera evanescens
- Syndesus ambericus
- Tainosia
- Termitaradus mitnicki
- Tertiapatus dominicanus
- Triatoma dominicana
- Tyrannasorus rex

== See also ==
- Lagerstätte
- Japanese amber
