= Rhus rooseae =

Rhus rooseae Temporal range: Middle Eocene 45-43mya

Scientific classification
- Kingdom: Plantae
- Clade: Tracheophytes
- Clade: Angiosperms
- Clade: Eudicots
- Clade: Rosids
- Order: Sapindales
- Family: Anacardiaceae
- Genus: Rhus
- Species: †R. rooseae

Binomial name
- †Rhus rooseae Manchester

Extinct species of flowering plant

Rhus rooseae is an extinct species of flowering plants in the sumac family, Anacardiaceae, solely known from the middle Eocene sediments exposed in north central Oregon. The species was first described from a series of isolated fossil seeds in chert.

== History and classification ==
Rhus rooseae has been identified from a single location in the Clarno Formation, the Clarno nut beds, type locality for both the formation and the species. The nut beds are approximately 3 kilometres (1.9 mi) east of the unincorporated community of Clarno, Oregon, and currently considered to be middle Eocene in age, based on averaging zircon fission track radiometric dating which yielded an age of 43.6 and 43.7 ± 10 million years ago and Argon–argon dating radiometric dating which yielded a 36.38 ± 1.31 to 46.8 ± 3.36 mya date. The average of the dates resulted in an age range of 45 to 43 mya. The beds are composed of silica and calcium carbonate cemented tuffaceous sandstones, siltstones, and conglomerates which preserve either a lake delta environment, or alternatively periodic floods and volcanic mudflows preserved with hot spring activity.

The species was described from a series of type specimens, the holotype specimen USNM 355036, which is currently preserved in the paleobotanical collections of the National Museum of Natural History in Washington, D.C., and nine paratype specimens which are in the University of Florida collections. The fossils were part of approximately 20,000 specimens collected from 1942 to 1989 by Thomas Bones, A. W. Hancock, R. A. Scott, Steven R. Manchester, and a number of high school students.

The Rhus rooseae specimens were studied by paleobotanist Steven R. Manchester of the University of Florida. He published his 1994 type description for R. rooseae in the Journal Palaeontographica Americana. The specific epithet rooseae was chosen in recognition of work done by Carrie L. Roose during the preparation of Clarno flora project.

== Description ==
The fruits of Rhus rooseae are bilaterally symmetrical with an subelliptic shape and both the tip and base rounded. The seeds have an overall length ranging between 3.3–4.3 millimetres (0.13–0.17 in) and a width between 4.2–5.1 centimetres (1.7–2.0 in). The seeds are identified as belonging to a Rhus species by the exterior morphology and by the structure of the vascular supply system. The mesocarp of the fruit hosts between 25 and 30 prominent vascular bundles which run longitudinally along the fruit surface. Also, as is typical of Rhus species, the fruits are flattened along the plane of symmetry and elliptic in cross section. The funicular depression where the petiole would have attached is located in the plane of symmetry, and so is a corresponding bulge on the opposite side of the fruit.
