= Cornus clarnensis =

Cornus clarnensis Temporal range: Middle Eocene 45-43mya

Scientific classification
- Kingdom: Plantae
- Clade: Tracheophytes
- Clade: Angiosperms
- Clade: Eudicots
- Clade: Asterids
- Order: Cornales
- Family: Cornaceae
- Genus: Cornus
- Species: †C. clarnensis

Binomial name
- †Cornus clarnensis Manchester

Extinct species of flowering plant

Cornus clarnensis is an extinct species of flowering plant in the dogwood family, Cornaceae, solely known from the middle Eocene sediments exposed in north central Oregon. The species was first described from a series of isolated fossil seeds in chert.

== History and classification ==
Cornus clarnensis has been identified from a single location in the Clarno Formation, the Clarno nut beds, type locality for both the formation and the species. The nut beds are approximately 3 kilometres (1.9 mi) east of the unincorporated community of Clarno, Oregon, and currently considered to be middle Eocene in age, based on averaging zircon fission track radiometric dating which yielded an age of 43.6 and 43.7 ± 4.36 million years ago and Argon–argon dating radiometric dating which yielded a 36.38 ± 1.31 to 46.8 ± 3.36 mya date. The average of the dates resulted in an age range of 45 to 43 mya. The beds are composed of silica and calcium carbonate cemented tuffaceous sandstones, siltstones, and conglomerates which preserve either a lake delta environment, or alternatively periodic floods and volcanic mudflows preserved with hot spring activity.

The species was described from a series of type specimens, the holotype specimen USNM 422378, which is currently preserved in the paleobotanical collections of the National Museum of Natural History in Washington, D.C., and four paratype specimens. Two of the paratypes are also in the National Museum collections, while the remaining two are in the University of Florida collections in Gainesville, Florida. The fossils were part of a group of approximately 20,000 specimens collected from 1942 to 1989 by Thomas Bones, Alonzo W. Hancock, R. A. Scott, Steven R. Manchester, and a number of high school students.

The Cornus clarnensis specimens were studied by paleobotanist Steven R. Manchester of the University of Florida. He published his 1994 type description for C. clarnensis in the journal Palaeontographica Americana. In his type description Manchester noted the specific epithet clarnensis was chosen in recognition of the town of Clarno located just west of the nut beds.

== Description ==
The fruits of Cornus clarnensis are generally globose to ellipsoidal in shape and either bilocular or trilocular. The fruits have an overall length ranging between 4.2–5.0 millimetres (0.17–0.20 in) and a maximum width between 3.8–4.4 millimetres (0.15–0.17 in). The exterior surface has a series of about ten grooves running longitudinally from the base to the apex. The septum does not possess a central vascular bundle, indicating a placement into the Cornaceae, while the overall fruit shape confirms it is a Cornus species.
