= State Museum of Natural History Stuttgart =

Science museum in Stuttgart, Germany

Coordinates: 48°48′19″N 9°11′25″E

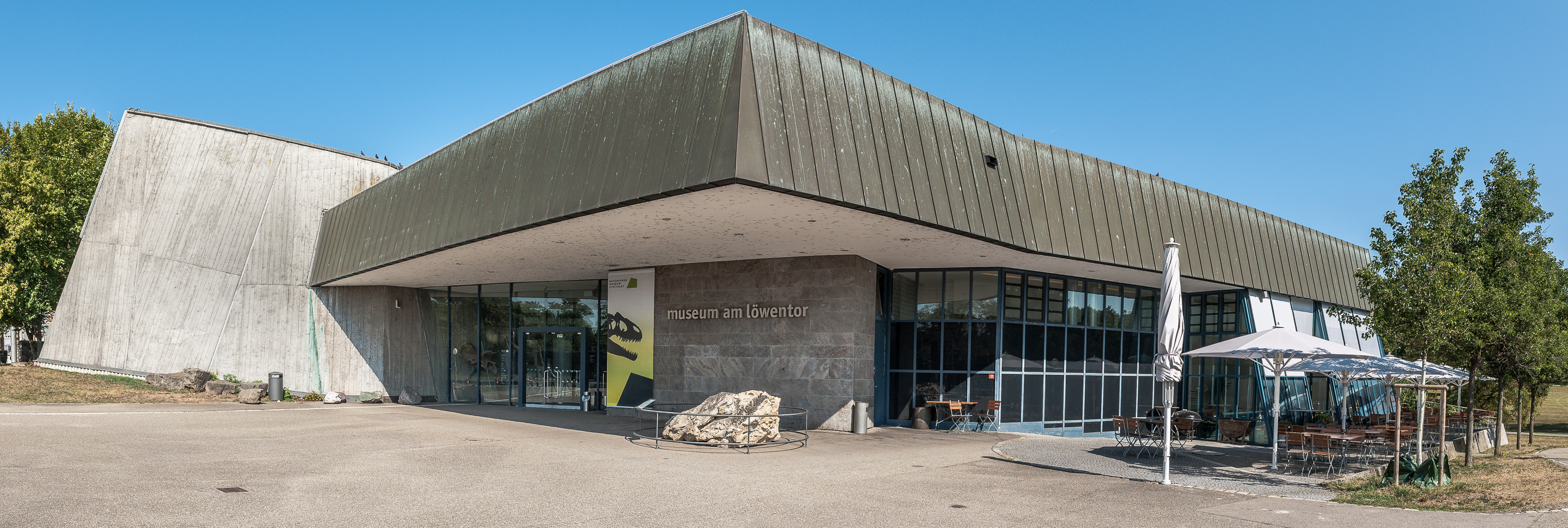
Museum am Löwentor

State Museum of Natural History Stuttgart

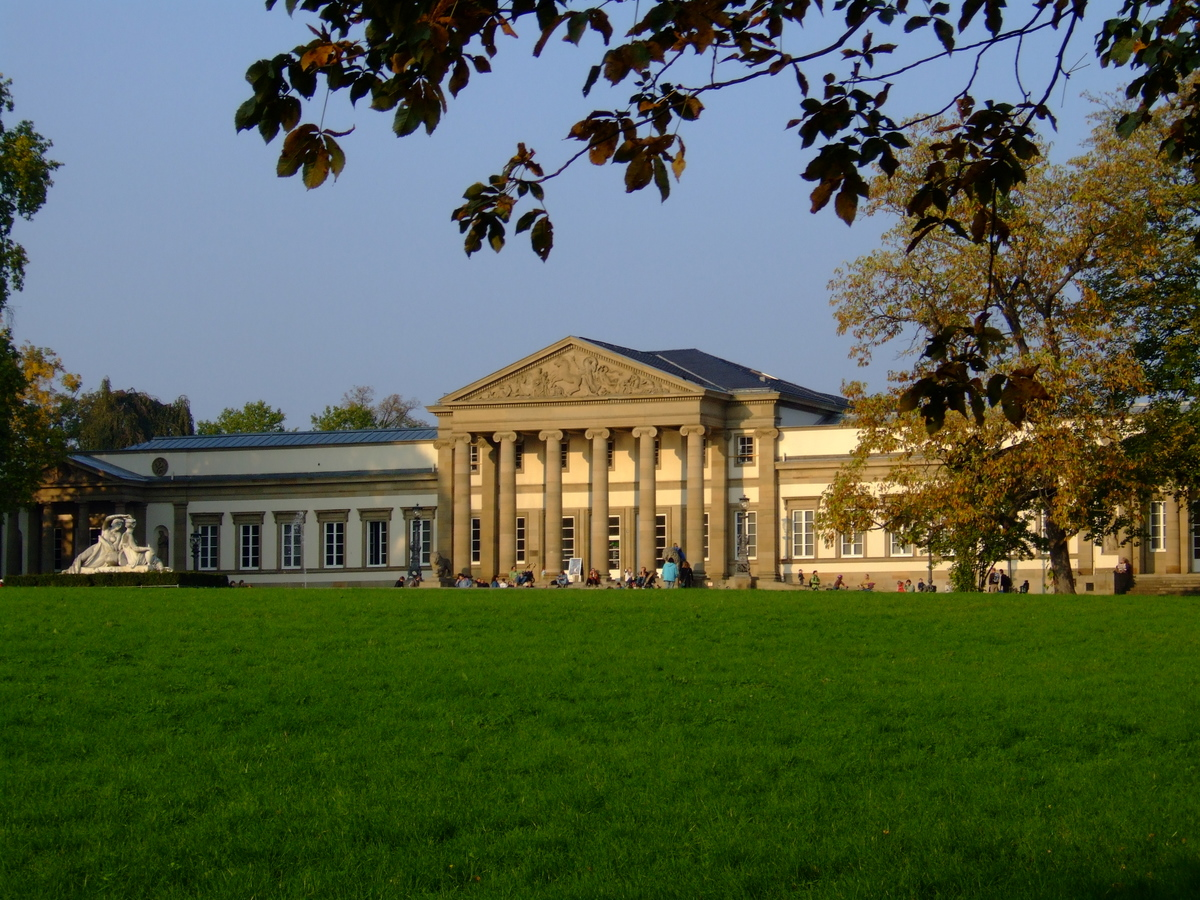
Rosenstein Palace, the museum's exhibition building for extant animals and ecology. View from the castle gardens

The State Museum of Natural History Stuttgart (German: Staatliches Museum für Naturkunde Stuttgart), abbreviated SMNS, is one of the two state of Baden-Württemberg's natural history museums. Together with the State Museum of Natural History Karlsruhe (Staatliches Museum für Naturkunde Karlsruhe) it is one of the most important repositories for state-owned natural history collections.

Exhibitions are shown in two buildings, both situated in the Rosenstein park in Stuttgart: the Löwentor Museum (German: Museum am Löwentor) houses the paleontology and geology exhibitions. At the same time, the Museum Rosenstein in Rosenstein Palace focuses on biology and natural history. Every year, the SMNS is visited by about 110,069 people.

== History ==
Prior to World War II, the natural history collection of Baden-Württemberg was located at the Neckarstraße in downtown Stuttgart. Part of the exhibits were destroyed during the war, when the original building was destroyed by fire after the Allied bombing. Luckily, most of the exhibits were sourced out and survived the war. Some specimens were also recovered form the rubble of the destroyed old museum building, including a spectacular plesiosaur (Meyerasaurus) today mounted in 3D in the Löwentor Museum exhibition.

The biological specimens of the State's collection are displayed at the castle Rosenstein since 1954. For the paleontological collection, the construction of a new exhibition building began in 1981 and was finished in 1985.

The principal exhibition area of Löwentor Museum consists of a single room, made up of three floors and over 3500 square meters (37'600 square feet) of exhibition area. The room has a height of up to 11 meters.

== Permanent exhibition ==
The Museum am Löwentor exhibition focuses mainly on fossils from its home state of Baden-Württemberg in southwestern Germany, and other localities in Germany. The state is rich in fossils, including several famous classical localities. Especially well exposed are terrestrial and marine Triassic, marine Jurassic and terrestrial Cenozoic sediments. Therefore, the museum exhibits the early prosauropod dinosaur Plateosaurus and other terrestrial animals from the Lower and Upper Triassic (Buntsandstein and Keuper, respectively), a wide range of marine fossils, mainly invertebrates, from the Muschelkalk, and a plethora of ichthyosaurs, pliosaurs and plesiosaurs, as well as sharks from the Posidonia Shale and other Lower Jurassic formations. Furthermore, exquisite Jurassic ammonites and other invertebrates are shown in large numbers. The Cenozoic is represented by invertebrates and mainly vertebrates from various German localities, including a pleistocene elephant and a copy of a mammoth mummy. Also on exhibit is the skull of the prehistoric man of Steinheim (Homo steinheimensis). The museum also houses a spectacular collection of plant and animal fossils in amber.

== Repatriation ==
In 2023 the museum was one of seven German museums to return Māori and Moriori remains to the Museum of New Zealand Te Papa Tongarewa in New Zealand.

== See also ==
- List of museums in Germany
- List of natural history museums
