= Mesothorax =

Segment of an insect body

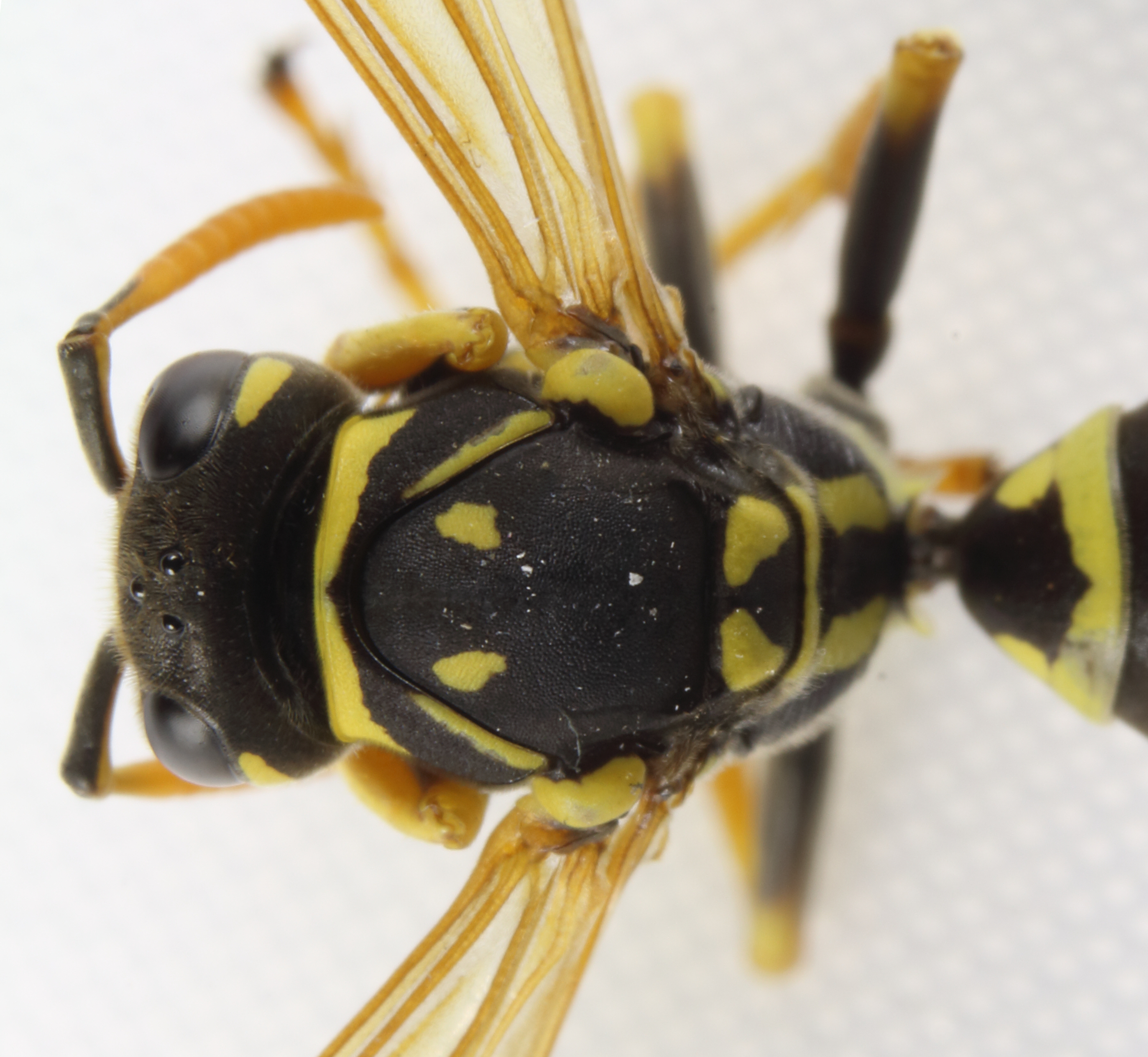
Mesothorax of Polistes dominula

The mesothorax is the middle of the three segments of the thorax of hexapods, and bears the second pair of legs. Its principal sclerites (exoskeletal plates) are the mesonotum (dorsal), the mesosternum (ventral), and the mesopleuron (lateral) on each side. The mesothorax is the segment that bears the forewings in all winged insects, though sometimes these may be reduced or modified, as in beetles (Coleoptera) or Dermaptera, in which they are sclerotized to form the elytra ("wing covers"), and the Strepsiptera, in which they are reduced to form halteres that attach to the mesonotum. All adult insects possess legs on the mesothorax. In some groups of insects, the mesonotum is hypertrophied, such as in Diptera, Hymenoptera, and Lepidoptera), in which the anterior portion of the mesonotum (called the mesoscutum, or simply "scutum") forms most of the dorsal surface of the thorax. In these orders, there is also typically a small sclerite attached to the mesonotum that covers the wing base, called the tegula. In one group of insects, the Hemiptera, the dorsal surface of the thorax is typically formed primarily of the prothorax, but also in part by the enlarged posterior portion of the mesonotum, called the scutellum; in the Coleoptera, the scutellum may or may not be visible, usually as a small triangular plate between the elytral bases, thus similar in position to the Hemipteran scutellum. In Diptera and Hymenoptera the mesothoracic scutellum is also distinct, but much smaller than the mesoscutum.

== See also ==
- Glossary of entomology terms
- Insect morphology
- Metathorax
- Prothorax
- Thorax (arthropod anatomy)
