= Cordillera Septentrional =

Mountains in the Dominican Republic

- Location within the Dominican Republic

Highest point
- Peak: Diego de Ocampo

Naming
- English translation: Northern Range

Geography
- Range coordinates: 19°36′50″N 70°43′44″W

The Cordillera Septentrional is a mountain range that runs parallel to the north coast of the Dominican Republic, with extensions to the northwest as Tortuga island in Haiti, and to the southeast through lowlands to where it rises as the Sierra de Samaná on the Samaná Peninsula.

The range's highest point is Diego de Ocampo mountain at 1,250 metres (4,100 ft), located near Santiago de los Caballeros in Santiago Province.

There are several small plains between the range and the Atlantic Ocean coastline. Rivers have short courses in the range, and most of them flow to the north into the Atlantic.
