= Hymenaea protera =

Hymenaea protera Temporal range: Eocene

Scientific classification
- Kingdom: Plantae
- Clade: Tracheophytes
- Clade: Angiosperms
- Clade: Eudicots
- Clade: Rosids
- Order: Fabales
- Family: Fabaceae
- Genus: Hymenaea
- Species: †H. protera

Binomial name
- †Hymenaea protera Poinar

Extinct species of legume

Hymenaea protera is an extinct prehistoric leguminous tree, the probable ancestor of present-day Hymenaea species. Most neotropical ambers come from its fossilized resin, including the famous Dominican amber.

H. protera once grew in an extensive range stretching from southern Mexico down to the Proto-greater Antilles, across northern South America, and on to the African continent. Both morphology and DNA studies have revealed that H. protera was more closely related to the only species of Hymenaea remaining in East Africa than to the more numerous American species.

In 1993, chloroplast DNA dated at 35–40 million years old was extracted from the leaf of H. protera, preserved in a fossil amber from the La Toca mines, Dominican Republic.
