= Hastata =

Hastata, a Latin word meaning hastate or spear-shaped, may refer to:

- a pointed leaf shape with barbs, shaped like a spear point, with flaring pointed lobes at the base

== Species Latin name ==
- A. hastata (disambiguation)
  - Amphisbaena hastata, a worm lizard species found in Brazil
  - Aquila hastata, Indian spotted eagle
  - Arenga hastata, a palm tree species in the genus Arenga
  - Atriplex hastata, fat hen, a plant species in the genus Atriplex
- B. hastata
  - Bolbitis hastata, (E. Fourn.) Hennipman., a fern species in the genus Bolbitis
- C. hastata (disambiguation)
  - Capparis hastata, a plant species
  - Chlamys hastata, the spear scallop or spiny scallop, a bivalve species
  - Cacalia hastata, a synonym for Parasenecio hastatus, a plant species
  - Clanga hastata, a synonym for the Indian spotted eagle
- D. hastata (disambiguation)
  - Dasyatis hastata, a stingray, currently a synonym of Bathytoshia centroura
  - Dysosmia hastata, a synonym for Passiflora foetida, the foetid passion flower or stinking passion flower
- G. hastata
  - Galeana hastata, a flowering plant species in the genus Galeana
- L. hastata
  - Lepechinia hastata, the pakata, a plant species in the genus Lepechinia
- N. hastata
  - Nymphoides hastata, (Dop) Kerr., an aquatic flowering plant species in the genus Nymphoides

== Subspecies and varieties ==
- Ourebia ourebi hastata, the oribi, a small antelope species found in Zaire, Malawi and Zimbabwe
- P. trichocarpa subsp. hastata and P. trichocarpa var. hastata, two synonyms for Populus trichocarpa, a tree species

== See also ==
- Hastatus (disambiguation)
