= P. hastatus =

P. hastatus may refer to:

- Parasenecio hastatus, a flowering plant species
- Phyllostomus hastatus, the greater spear-nosed bat, a mammal species from South and Central America

== See also ==
- Hastatus (disambiguation)
