= C. hastata =

C. hastata may refer to:

- Capparis hastata, a plant species
- Chlamys hastata, the spear scallop or spiny scallop, a bivalve species

== Synonyms ==
- Cacalia hastata, a synonym for Parasenecio hastatus, a plant species

== See also ==
- Hastata (disambiguation)
