= C. hastatus =

C. hastatus may refer to:

- Coccorchestes hastatus, Balogh, 1980, a jumping spider species in the genus Coccorchestes found in New Guinea
- Coluber hastatus, a synonym for Bothrops lanceolatus, a snake species endemic to Martinique
- Corydoras hastatus, the dwarf corydoras, dwarf catfish, tail spot pigmy catfish or micro catfish, a tropical freshwater fish

== See also ==
- Hastatus (disambiguation)
