= O. cornutus =

O. cornutus may refer to:

- Odontomachus cornutus, an ant species
- Oxyopes cornutus, a lynx spider species

== See also ==
- Cornutus (disambiguation)
