= Trap jaw =

Trap jaw may refer to:

- Trap-jaw ants, carnivorous ants of family Formicidae
- Trap jaw snakes, venomous pit vipers found in the United States
- Trap Jaw, a fictional cyborg villain from Masters of the Universe
