= A. hastata =

A. hastata may refer to:

- Amphisbaena hastata, a worm lizard species found in Brazil
- Arenga hastata, a palm tree species in the genus Arenga
- Atriplex hastata, a plant species in the genus Atriplex

== See also ==
- Hastata (disambiguation)
