= Hastatus =

- the singular of hastati, a class of infantry in the armies of the early Roman Republic who originally fought as spearmen

== Species Latin names ==
- A. hastatus
  - Amphineurus hastatus, Alexander, 1925, a crane fly species in the genus Amphineurus
- D. hastatus
  - Dendryphantes hastatus, Clerck, 1757, a jumping spider species in the genus Dendryphantes with a palearctic distribution
- O. hastatus
  - Odontomachus hastatus, Fabricius, 1804, a carnivorous ant species in the genus Odontomachus
- S. hastatus
  - Saccoderma hastatus, a fish species in the genus Saccoderma found in the Magdalena river in Colombia
  - Serrasalmus hastatus, a piranha species in the genus Serrasalmus
- T. hastatus
  - Thermocyclops hastatus antillensis, a crustacean species in the genus Thermocyclops

== Subspecies ==
- Thermocyclops schmeili hastatus, a crustacean species in the genus Thermocyclops

== See also ==
- Hastata (disambiguation)
- Hastatum
