= Hiroshige (given name) =

- Gender: Male

Origin
- Origin: Japanese
- Meaning: Different meanings depending on the kanji used

Hiroshige (written: 広重, 啓成 or 弘成) is a masculine Japanese given name. Notable people with the name include:

- Hiroshige (歌川 広重) (1797–1858), Japanese ukiyo-e artist
- Hiroshige II (歌川広重 2代目) (1829–1869), Japanese ukiyo-e artist
- Hiroshige III (歌川広重 3代目) (1842 or 1843 – 1894), Japanese ukiyo-e artist
- Hiroshige Koyama (1937-2016), Japanese botanist
- Hiroshige Seko (世耕 弘成) (born 1962), Japanese politician
- Hiroshige Yanagimoto (柳本 啓成) (born 1972), Japanese footballer
