= D. hastata =

D. hastata may refer to:

- Dasyatis hastata, the roughtail stingray, a cartilaginous fish species
- Dysosmia hastata, a synonym for Passiflora foetida, the foetid passion flower or stinking passion flower

== See also ==
- Hastata (disambiguation)
