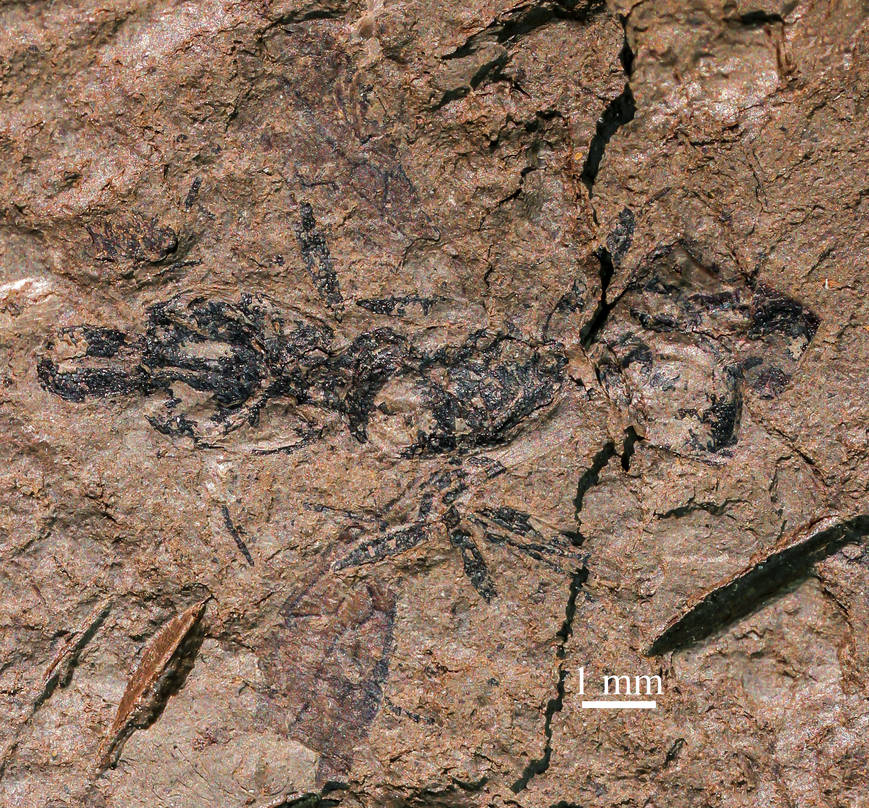
- Odontomachus paleomyagra holotype

Scientific classification
- Domain: Eukaryota
- Kingdom: Animalia
- Phylum: Arthropoda
- Class: Insecta
- Order: Hymenoptera
- Family: Formicidae
- Genus: Odontomachus
- Species: †O. paleomyagra

Binomial name
- †Odontomachus paleomyagra Wappler, Dlussky, Engel, Prokop & Knor, 2014

= Odontomachus paleomyagra =

Odontomachus paleomyagra Temporal range: Priabonian

Extinct species of ant

Odontomachus paleomyagra is an extinct species of formicid in the ant subfamily Ponerinae known from a Miocene fossil found in Europe.

== History and classification ==
O. paleomyagra is known from a single ant found in the Czech Republic. The specimen was described from a compression fossil preserved in lignite deposits of the Most Basin. The site is exposed because of the workings of the Bílina Mine, an opencast lignite mine in Bílina, Bohemia, Czech Republic. The mine exposes an approximately 150 m (490 ft) thick sequence of deposits recording the progression of a delta lake and bog ecosystem. Fossils of eleven different insect orders are recorded in the Bílina site, representing members of 31 different insect families, with formicids being the most common insects, being nearly 40% of the specimens collected.

Over the lifetime of the lake, the Bílina area was a delta region of a large drainage system emptying into a shallow 5 km (5,000.0 m) lake, with expansive peat bogs surrounding it. There are several different fish and at least one frog from the genus Rana also known from the Bílina mine area that may have fed on the ants that fell into the lake. The low bog forest where O. paleomyagra lived had a mix of temperate plants such as alders, oaks and swamp cypress along with more tropical plants such as climbing fern, palmetto and rattan palms.

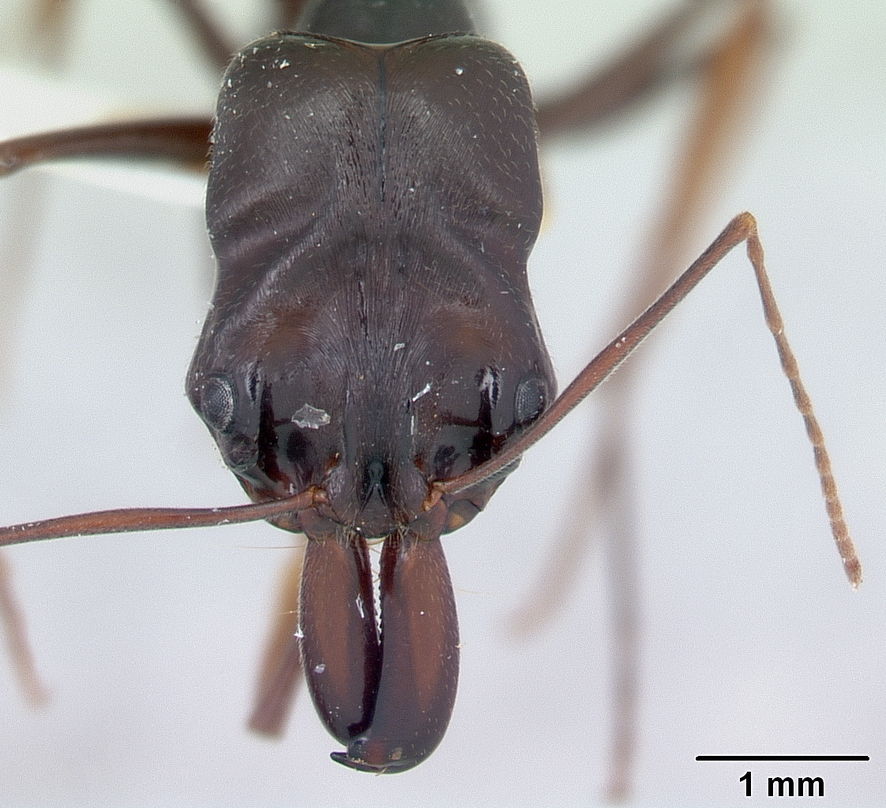
Odontomachus assiniensis worker

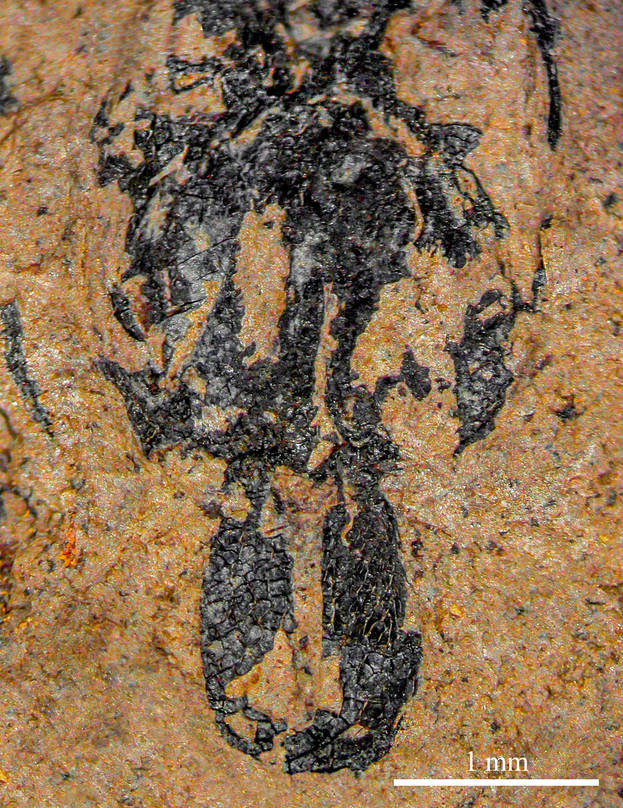
O. paleomyagra head

The fossil was studied by a team of paleoentomologists led by Torsten Wappeler, with the group's 2014 type description of the new species being published in the journal Paläontologische Zeitschrift. The specific epithet paleomyagra is a combination of the Greek words for "ancient", "mouse", and "trap". When first described, O. paleomyagra was one of three Odontomachus species that had been described from fossils, with both Odontomachus pseudobauri and Odontomachus spinifer being described in 1994 from fossils found in Dominican amber. Both Dominican amber species are placed in the Odontomachus haematodus species group, which is neotropical in distribution. O. paleomyagra is distinct from haematodus group species in the less complex mandible dentition, and in the shape of the head.

The simpler mandibles of O. paleomyagra are closer to those of the extant south-east African species Odontomachus assiniensis and to the south-east Asian species group rixosus, including Odontomachus rixosus, Odontomachus monticola, and Odontomachus latidens. Unlike these species however, O. paleomyagra has a shorter more squared off head, rather than the elongated heads of the modern species.

== Description ==
The O. paleomyagra queen is estimated to have been 12 mm (0.47 in) long. The fossil has a total preserved length of 10.5 mm (0.41 in). The head is nearly square in outline, being only 1.2 times longer than wide, with slightly bowed-in sides, rear corners which are rounded and the rear edge which is concave. The front region of the head has distinct striations, and the small oval eyes are placed notably close to the front edge of the head. There is little constriction of the head to the rear of the eyes, with the width across the eyes 1.06 time the width across the vertex of the head. In front of the clypeus, the bases of the long straight mandibles are placed close together. On the masticatory margin there are no denticles, with possibly three teeth present at the tip end of each mandible. Only two are visible. The thorax is slightly elongated, with a mesoscutum that is a little wider than long and attaching with no overhang of the sclerites to the propodeum. The petiole is rounded and narrow, without a spine on the upper surface.
