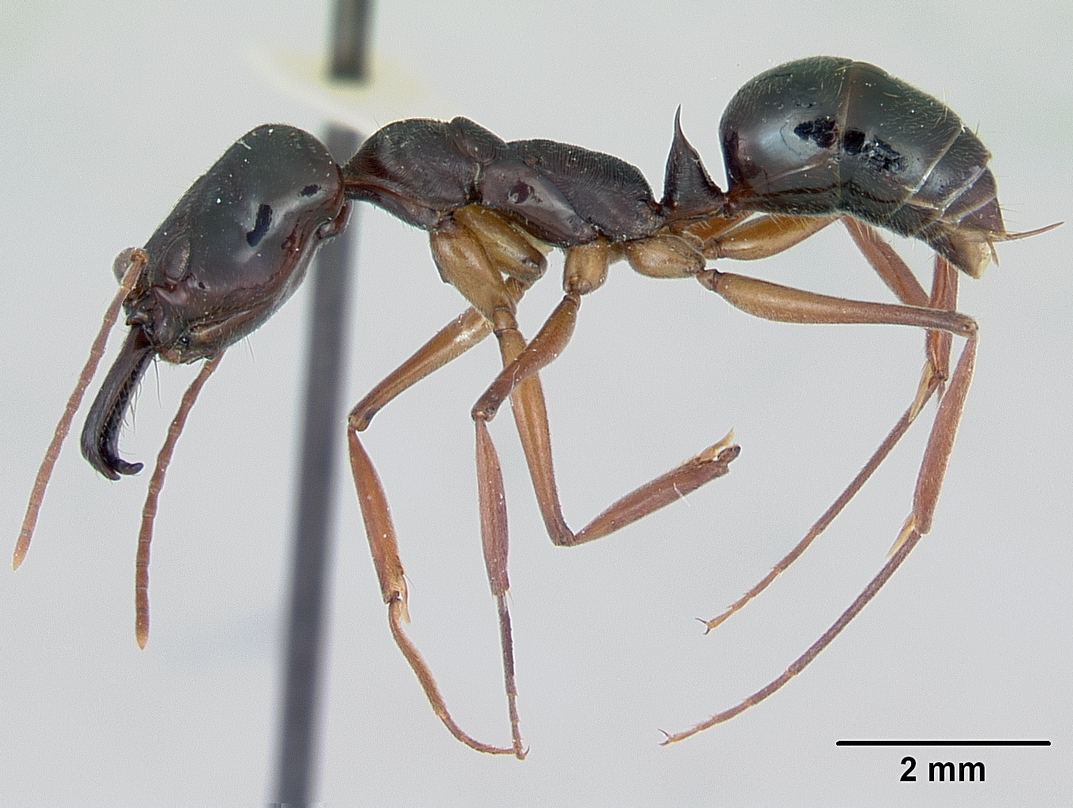

Scientific classification
- Kingdom: Animalia
- Phylum: Arthropoda
- Class: Insecta
- Order: Hymenoptera
- Family: Formicidae
- Genus: Odontomachus
- Species: O. bauri

Binomial name
- Odontomachus bauri Emery, 1892

= Odontomachus bauri =

Species of ant

Odontomachus bauri is a species of ponerinae ant known as trap jaw ants. The trap jaw consists of mandibles which contain a spring-loaded catch mechanism.

This mechanism allows the ants to accumulate energy before striking or releasing the mandibles rapidly. O. bauri is known for its powerful mandibles, which can open up to about 180° and within 10ms of being stimulated and can close within 0.5 ms, which help with catching prey. The mandibles are able to sting and paralyze prey or crush prey to death. O. bauri also uses its mandibles to propel itself or prey off of the ground either vertically or horizontally. O. bauri can travel over 20 times their body length in a single jaw-propelled leap. O. bauri is closely related to the genus Anochetus which is in the same family, Formicidae. It has been discovered from southern Costa Rica throughout tropical South America, the West Indies (except Cuba and Bahamas), and on the Galapagos Islands.

== Identification ==
O. bauri‘s main feature is its dark brown color. Additionally, the face to the near margin of vertex is striated. The head is 2.09–3.12 mm (0.082–0.123 in) long. There is pubescence or hair on the first gastral tergum and is partially found standing straight up and relatively uniform. The petiolar node (B on Figure 2) is dome-shaped when seen from the side.

The larvae of this species are ornamented with spines and adhesive pads, like others in the genus, however present a few unique features regarding minute sensilla and the relative size of structures. They undergo three larval stages before moulting, without spinning a cocoon.

== Habitat ==
O. bauri is found from southern Costa Rica throughout tropical South America, the West Indies (except Cuba and the Bahamas), on the Galapagos Islands, and the north of Mexico. It is also one of the most common ants around homes and gardens in Southern Brazil. O. bauri is most often discovered in lowlands usually residing in tropical rainforests, although the species appears more tolerant of dry conditions than many other Odontomachus species.

O. bauri typically forms nests in soft and humid grounds in areas protected from direct sunlight and areas where there is a low chance of disturbance by nature, i.e. wind, rain etc. One may be able to find nests under rocks, branches, and trunks of fallen trees. Additionally, if they are found in gardens, they are usually under rocks, plant containers, and vegetable residues.

== Foraging behavior ==
O. bauri has a Polydomous nest structure in which there are multiple nests for a single colony. This characteristic was confirmed when researchers observed that many neighboring nests do not fight with one another, but nest which are more than 10 m (33 ft) apart would be highly aggressive towards one another. Additionally, there were many times which observers seen trap jaw ants sharing food among their colony members.

Nests are usually small, roughly less than 200 ants. The foraging areas between each family of nests are strictly defined. O. bauri has been observed staying within the same area while foraging, because it would not dare step into its neighbor's foraging area.

O. bauri usually spends its time below the leaf litter, classifying it as a leaf-litter ant. It is also widely known as a generalist predator. A few of O. bauri’s common prey include worms, spiders, termites, ants, butterflies, flies, and beetles. Usually prey would be around 3 mm and 4 mm in length. The most common prey O. bauri enjoys are soft bodied, for example, termites and wood lice. O. bauri is able to “exploit a food resource largely unavailable to other ants”. This was determined after a researcher found remnants of Nasuitermes a type of termite that as a defense will discharge material that irritates and can block the predator's sensory organs. Finding parts of this type of termite prove that the mandibles of O. bauri are able to combat prey which is chemically protected.

Workers are observed returning to places where they had previously found food. The foraging success for an individual, which is measured by how many workers return with prey, would be 28%. About 41% of the workers who were returning from foraging were empty handed and the other 31% had no prey or the prey was too small to be distinguished.

== Speed ==
O. bauri have the second-fastest moving predatory appendages within the animal kingdom, after the dracula ant (Mystrium camillae). After stimulation of one of the four trigger hairs, the appendage of O. bauri will respond within 10ms. It has peak speeds of 126–230 km/h (78–143 mph), with the jaws closing within just 130 microseconds on average. This is about 2300 times faster than the blink of an eye. The peak force exerted was in the order of 300 times the body weight of the ant. The ants were also observed using their jaws as catapults to eject intruders or fling themselves backwards to escape a threat.

The biology behind this amazing ability is that when one trigger hair is stimulated, it actually causes all four large motor neurons to become active. These large motor neurons are fully covered in a glial sheath which is a group of specialized cells that nourish and support neurons. A glial sheath is essential for sending signals at a fast rate, because it allows for a single smooth road rather than having the signal jump from neuron to neuron.

The mandibles are controlled by the stimulation of two large sensory neurons that project through the sensory mandibular nerve into the suboesophageal ganglion. To operate the mandible muscles, the ends of the sensory neurons lead to the thick dendritic trunks of the four motor neurons.

The mandibles of O. bauri are kept in place with a latch called the clypeus. Once the latch is released, all of the energy stored is quickly released and the mandibles close, very similar to a crossbow when fired.

The trigger muscles found in O. bauri are also found in the fastest synchronous muscles of cicadas. The muscles appear to have been sculpted for fast contraction. This is because the sarcomere length, which is the fundamental unit of muscle structure, is similar in length.

== Jumping records ==
O. bauri typically uses its appendages in capturing prey. However, it may also be used in propelling its body into the air and this may result in two different types of jumps. A “bouncer-defense jump” is when O. bauri throws itself backwards away from the potential prey due to the mandibles striking an upright object. An “escape jump” involves O. bauri positioning its jaws towards the ground before firing and is launched vertically into the air. Additionally, to distinguish an escape jump from a bouncer-defense jump, O. bauri will orient its head in a particular manner.

“Bouncer-defense jumps” are looked upon as mere accidents rather than purposeful acts performed by the trap-jaw ant. This is because they most frequently execute this jump when there are faced with a large harmless prey rather than with small prey. This evidence concludes that this type of jump is produced by a non-penetrating strike. “Bouncer-defense jumps” are usually horizontal jumps which can lead to the ant to land anywhere 40 centimeters away from its original position.

On the other hand, “escape jumps” propel the ant vertically and are proved to be intentional because of the behaviors that precede the jump. Before an “escape jump,” the ant will orient its antennae and head perpendicularly to the intruder. Additionally it will sway its entire body and then lift one leg vertically. This is quite an elaborate routine to prepare to propel itself 7 cm off of the ground. The reason behind this maneuver is to be able to grab onto vegetation usually located around their nests in order to provide a form of escape.

== Alarm and defense ==
O. bauri is a very aggressive species of ant. Once its nest is disturbed there are many worker ants performing the escape jump. If one lands on the intruder, then the workers immediately began stinging the prowler. Fortunately for the intruder, only a few of the workers in the nest will participate in stinging the intruder unlike ant species from the genus Solenopsis. The bites are not severe for humans, but they do produce an allergic reaction. Their venom is thought to be essentially proteinaceous in composition.

Trap-jaw ants do not have similar stingers as bees. Instead, their stings are retractable and not barbed in order to be used again. The sting is located at the end of the abdomen and is completely covered by a sheath, a protective covering. Besides the momentary sting from the bite, O. bauri contains a mixture of formic acid and protein, which may have a high toxic activity, and is discharged after the ant bite. Within humans, there have been records of immediate burning at the site of the sting but that usually dissipates after an hour. However, there was one case in which a young girl had an intense allergic reaction to the bite. There were patches of red, itchy, swollen areas on her hands, arms, thorax and foot. Additionally, her eyelids were swollen. This lasted about a week and has been discovered in about 16% of ant bites.

== Recognition ==
O. bauri is able to recognize other workers from different nests by antennation. This process happens when two ants are front to front of one another, and either one is touching the other's antennae with their antennae or head. There are four different behavioral patterns that may result after recognition of the other ant. These are basic alertness, alarm, attack with mandibles or attack with sting. Basic alertness occurs when both ants open their mandibles to about 180°. Alarm is composed of both basic alertness with fast random body movements and release of alarm pheromone. Attack with mandibles is a pattern in which the trap jaw ant will use its mandibles in order to strike a blow to the opponent. Attack with sting is when the trap jaw ant will bend its abdomen forward and try to use its sting to hurt the opponent.

O. bauri ants use a volatile substance, dichloromethane (CH_{2}Cl_{2}) to recognize their nestmates. Individuals from different colonies have different amounts of volatile chemicals within its system so the cue to knowing one's relative is the amount of substance captured during antennation. The recognition signal does not pertain to environmental cues, since O. bauri attacked ants which were kept in the colony surrounded by a wire mesh capsule more than the controls, which were kept inside the colony. To further rule out environmental cues as an option, Jaffe et al. fed two different colonies the same diet and fed a single colony two different diets. When the trap jaw ants from the single colony but different diets met they did not attack each other. However, when the ants from two different colonies but same diets met they attacked each other roughly 75% of the time. Additionally, the recognition signal is not a sound or a particular behavior since O. bauri is able to recognize dead nestmates. The recognition signal must be a type of smell, since ants which were freeze dried or in a plastic wire mesh capsule were never attacked.

== Evolution ==
The mandibles of O. bauri are an exaggerated form of the sturdy and long mandibles found in many ant species. Additionally, the muscles found in the mandibles of O. bauri are found in other ants, although those found in O. bauri are large and look very similar to those found in cicadas.

The mandibles and the muscles found in the mandibles are exaptations, the large mandibles probably were selected for the increased ability to carry food, and further modified to use as a way of defense and hunting.

There are other ants with trap-jaws such as the extant Strumigenys, Mystrium, Myrmoteras and Anochetus along with the extinct Cretaceous age tribe Haidomyrmecini. One commonly accepted theory suggests that the trap-jaw actually evolved independently at least four different times in ants’ history. This is because with the use of DNA sequencing, the phylogenetic tree which found that those ants with trap-jaws were not nested neatly in one portion of the tree. Instead they were found scattered around the tree. Therefore, it did not evolve once leading to the hypothesis of a common ancestor. Instead it evolved multiple times and each time it evolved it used a different feature of the ant's mouth to produce the trap jaw. For instance, O. bauri’s trap jaw is built from the mandible joint; however, Strumigenys trigger is built from it upper lip. This type of evolution would be deemed as convergent evolution and the trap jaw would be considered an analogy. This is because they are all similar features but involved independently rather than a common ancestor.
