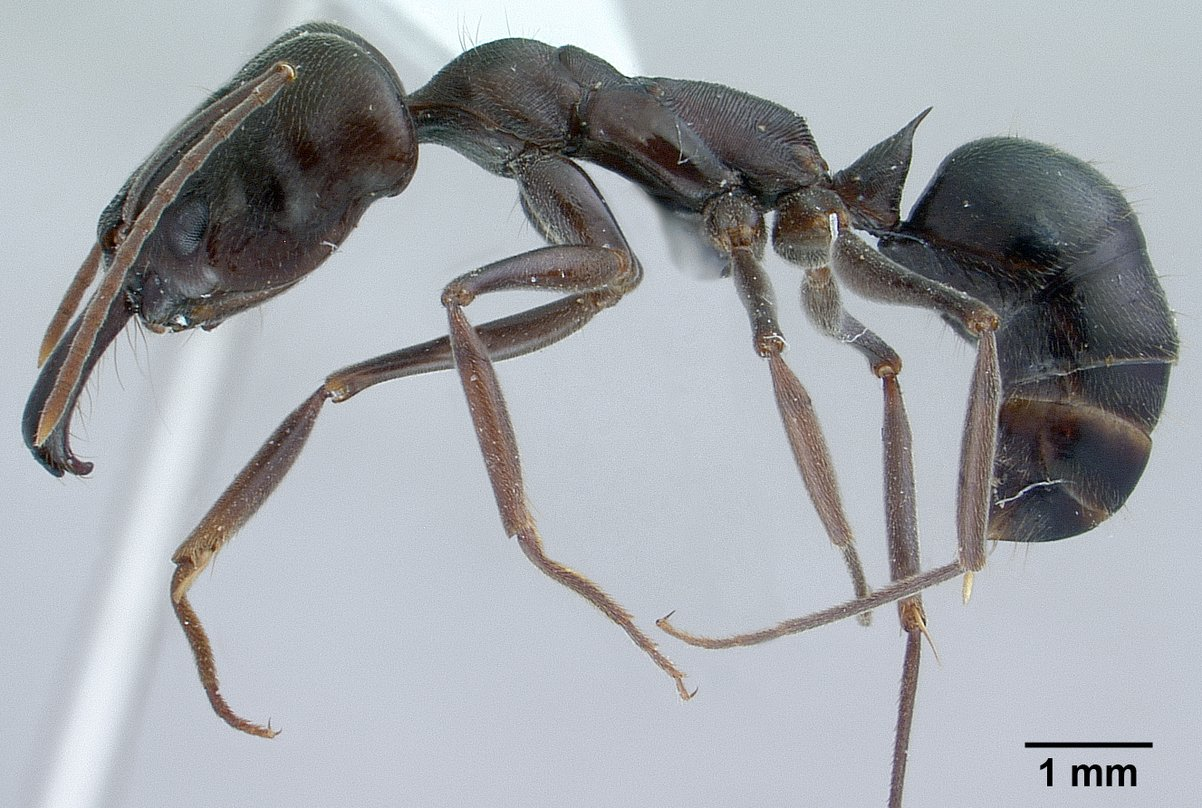

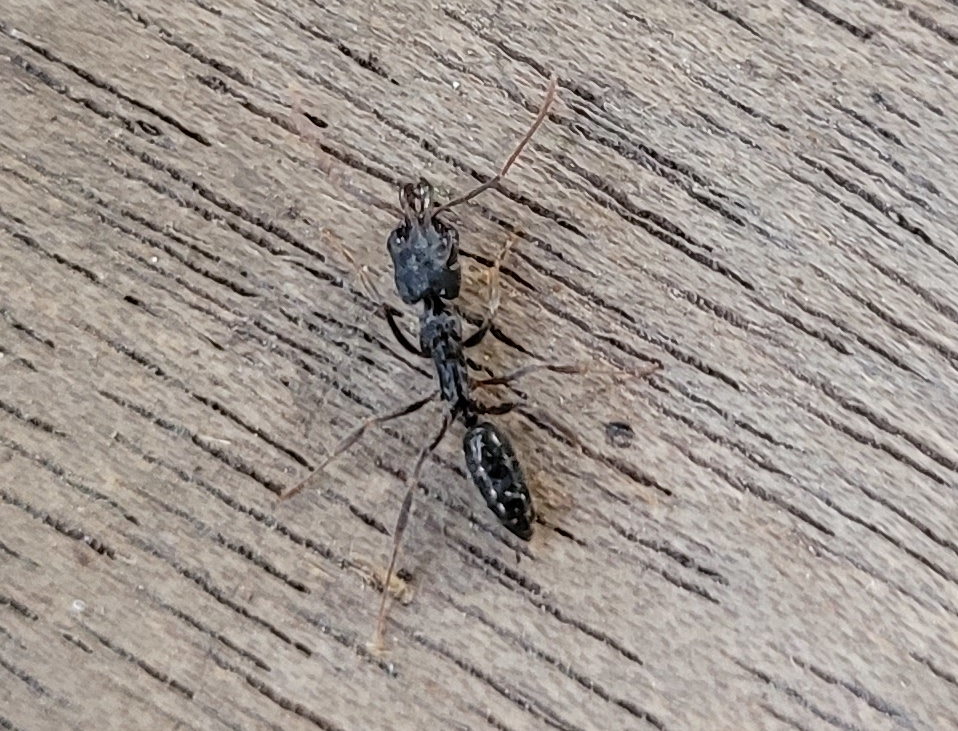

Scientific classification
- Kingdom: Animalia
- Phylum: Arthropoda
- Clade: Pancrustacea
- Class: Insecta
- Order: Hymenoptera
- Family: Formicidae
- Genus: Odontomachus
- Species: O. simillimus

Binomial name
- Odontomachus simillimus Smith, F., 1858

Synonyms
- Odontomachus haematoda breviceps Crawley, 1915; Odontomachus haematodes fuscipennis Forel, 1913; Ponera pallidicornis Smith, F., 1860

= Odontomachus simillimus =

Species of ant

Odontomachus simillimus is a species of ant of the subfamily Ponerinae, which can be found from many Asian, and African countries.
