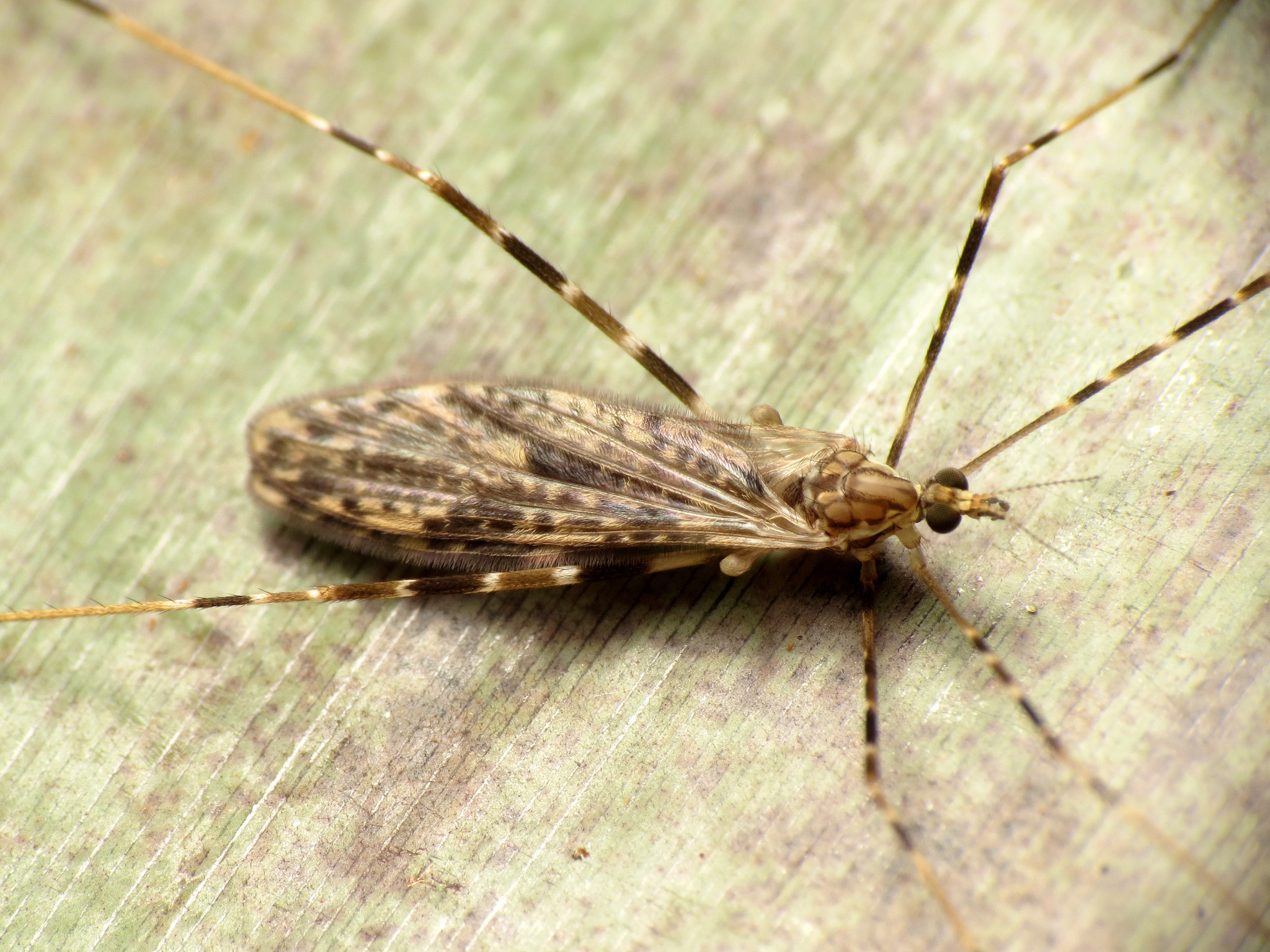

Scientific classification
- Kingdom: Animalia
- Phylum: Arthropoda
- Class: Insecta
- Order: Diptera
- Family: Limoniidae
- Genus: Amphineurus
- Species: A. hudsoni

Binomial name
- Amphineurus hudsoni (Edwards, 1923)

= Amphineurus hudsoni =

Species of crane fly

Amphineurus hudsoni is a species of crane fly native to New Zealand. The species was first described by Frederick Wallace Edwards in 1923.

== Taxonomy ==
The species is found within the Amphineurus subgenus of Amphineurus.

== Description ==
Edwards described the species as follows:

Head dark grey, with some black hair. Proboscis and palpi black. Scape and base of flagellum of antennae ochreous, remainder dark brown. Antennae alike in the two sexes; flagellar joints about three times as long as broad, slightly thicker in middle, with verticils little longer than joints. Thorax—pronotum, a spot on the shoulders and another in front of wing-base yellowish. Mesonotum mainly occupied by three brownish-grey stripes, narrowly separated in front by dark-brown lines. Pleurae pale grey with some dark-brown markings. Postnotum brownish-grey with whitish spot on each side near base. Abdomen as in A. bicinctus, but male hypopygium has only two pairs of claspers, the third (middle) pair being represented by minute rudiments; upper pair longer and more slender than in A. bicinctus, smooth except for tip, which is blunt and serrated; ninth tergite has two large black pointed lobes. Legs—coxae pale ochreous, dusted with grey; trochanters ochreous. Femora ochreous-brown, with blackish ring close to base, and two other rather broad blackish rings, bordered on each edge with white; tip rather broadly ochreous-brown. Tibiae brownish-ochreous, with blackish ring near base, bordered with white; tip broadly black, preceded by narrow white ring. Tarsi blackish. Wings much as in A. bicinctus, but the pale hairs more numerous, especially in region of cord. Halteres ochreous. Length of body, 5 mm.; wing, 7 mm.

== Distribution ==
The species is endemic to New Zealand, an is found on the mainland and the Chatham Islands.

== Behaviour ==
The larvae of Amphineurus hudsoni feeds on the decaying leaves of nīkau palm trees.

== Gallery ==
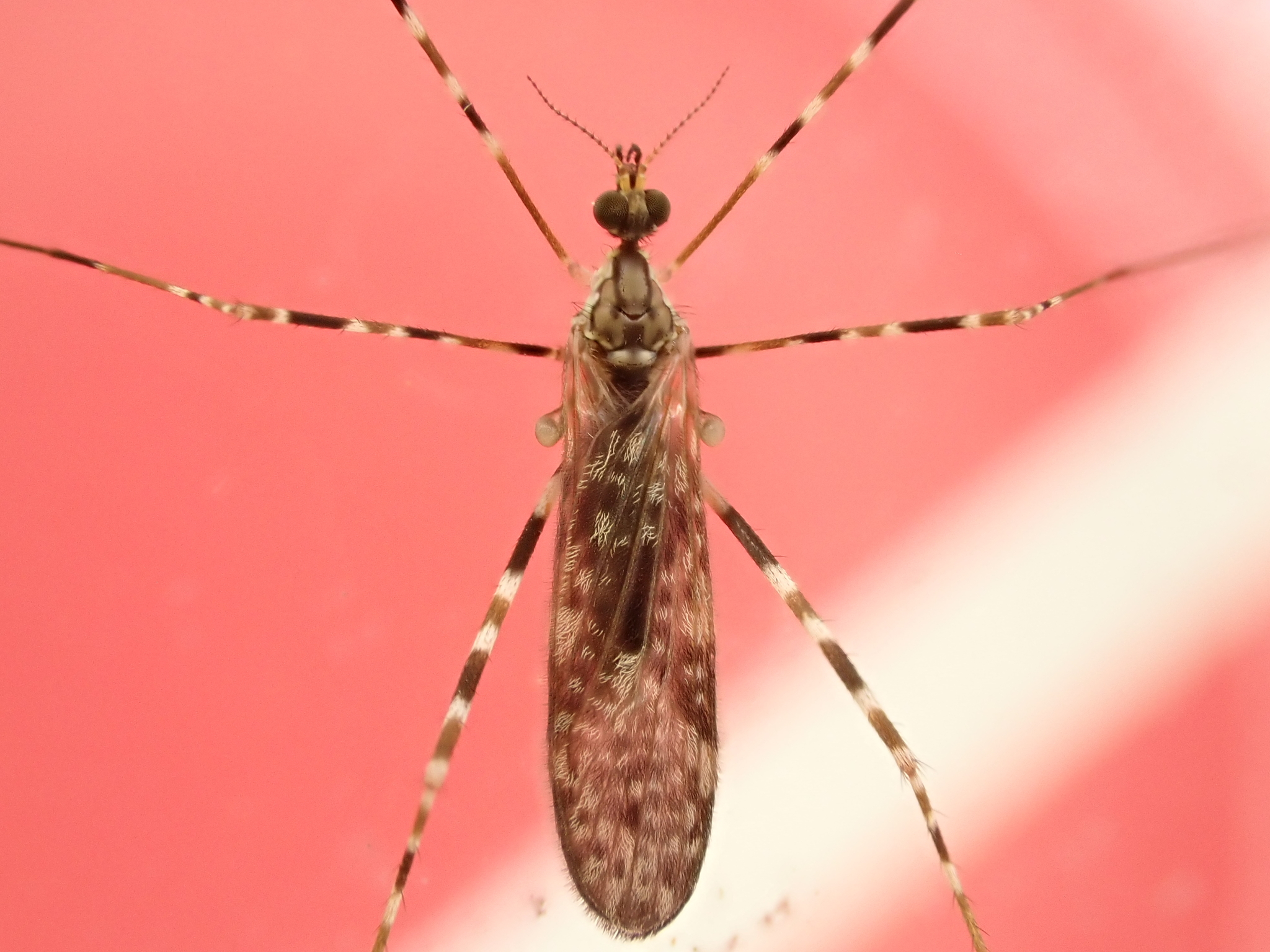
Close-up of Amphineurus hudsoni

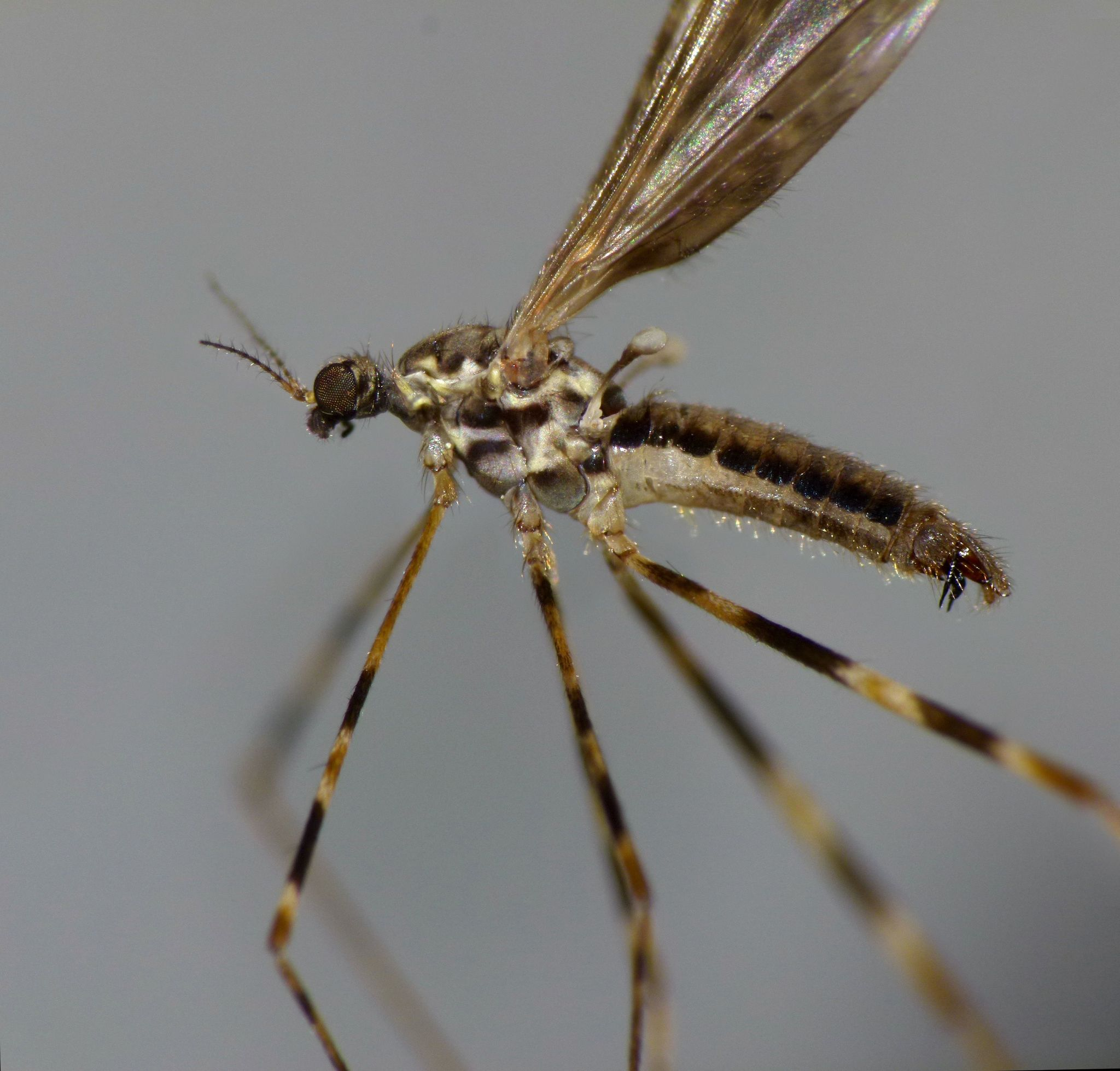
Side view of Amphineurus hudsoni

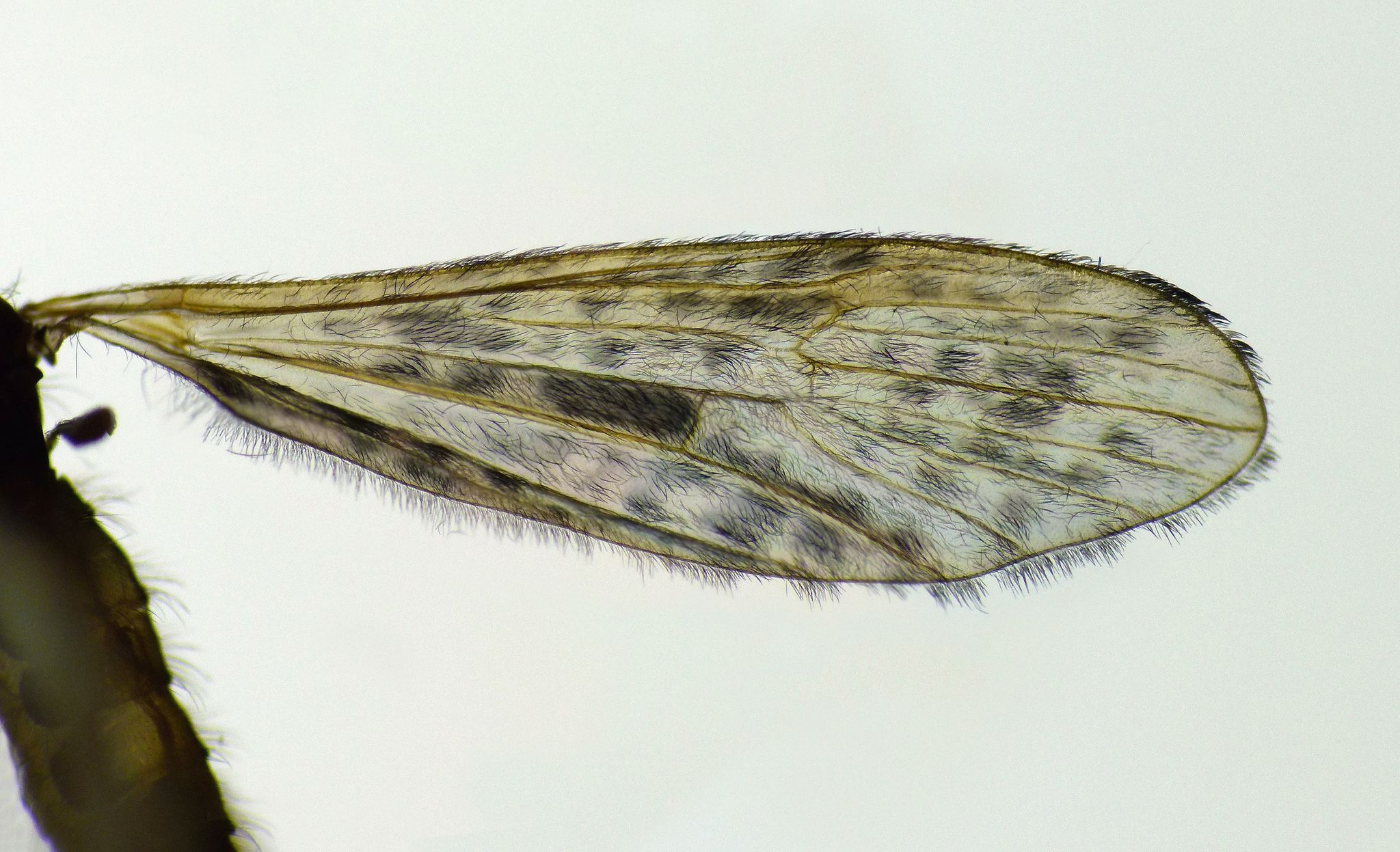
Wings of Amphineurus hudsoni
