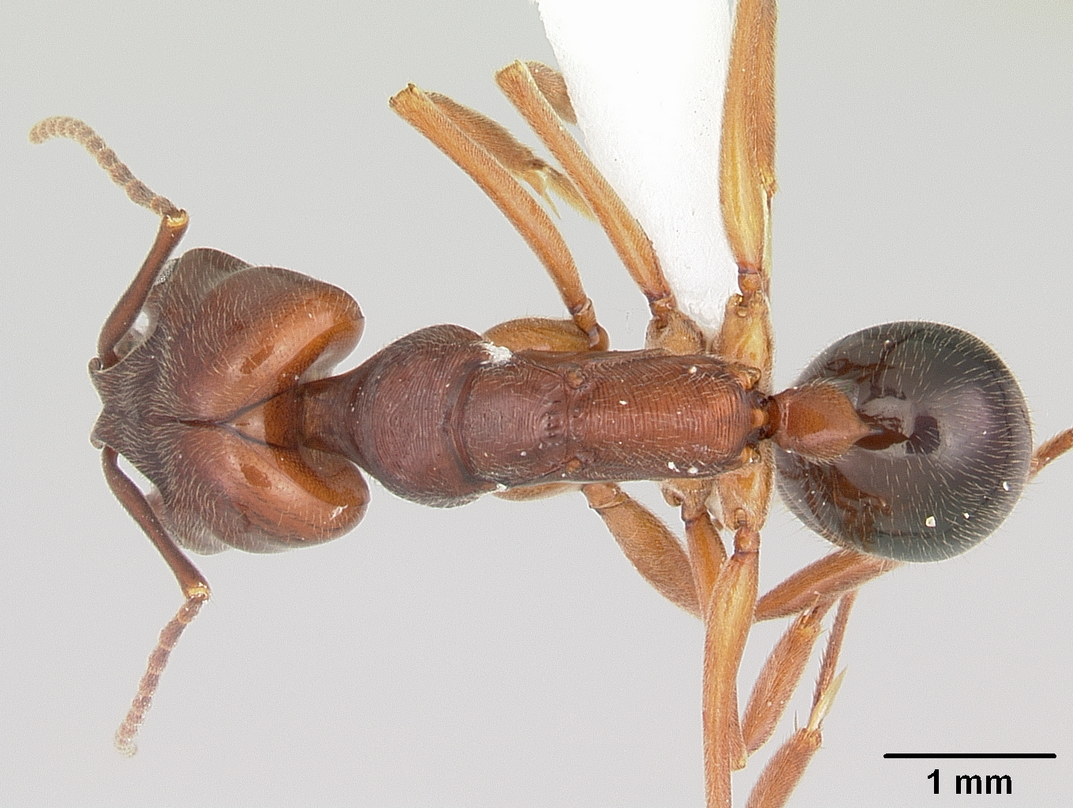

Scientific classification
- Kingdom: Animalia
- Phylum: Arthropoda
- Class: Insecta
- Order: Hymenoptera
- Family: Formicidae
- Genus: Odontomachus
- Species: O. clarus

Binomial name
- Odontomachus clarus Roger, 1861

= Odontomachus clarus =

Species of ant

Odontomachus clarus is a species of ant in the family Formicidae. It is endemic to Florida scrubs on the Lake Wales Ridge in Florida.

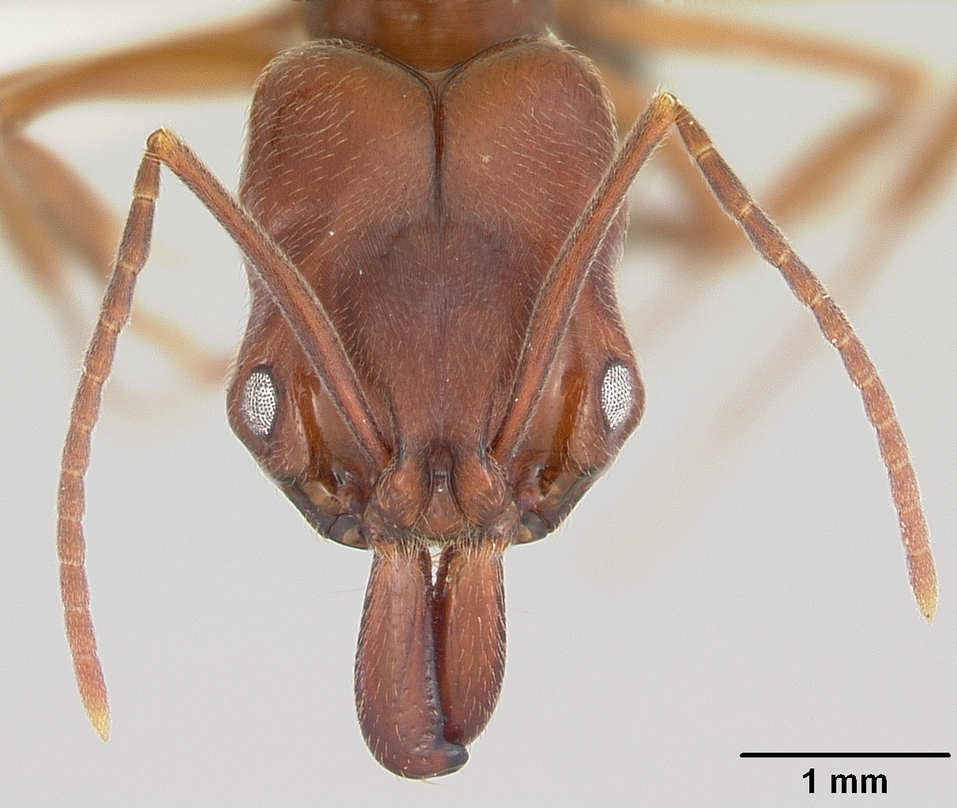

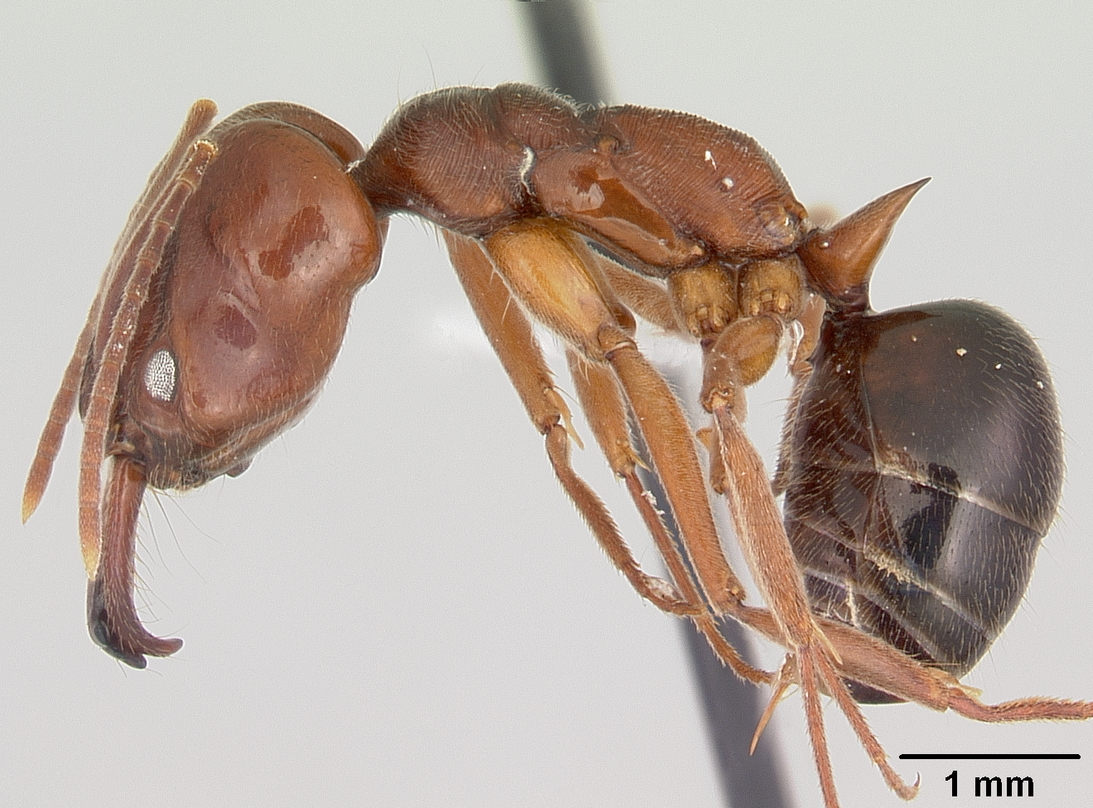
