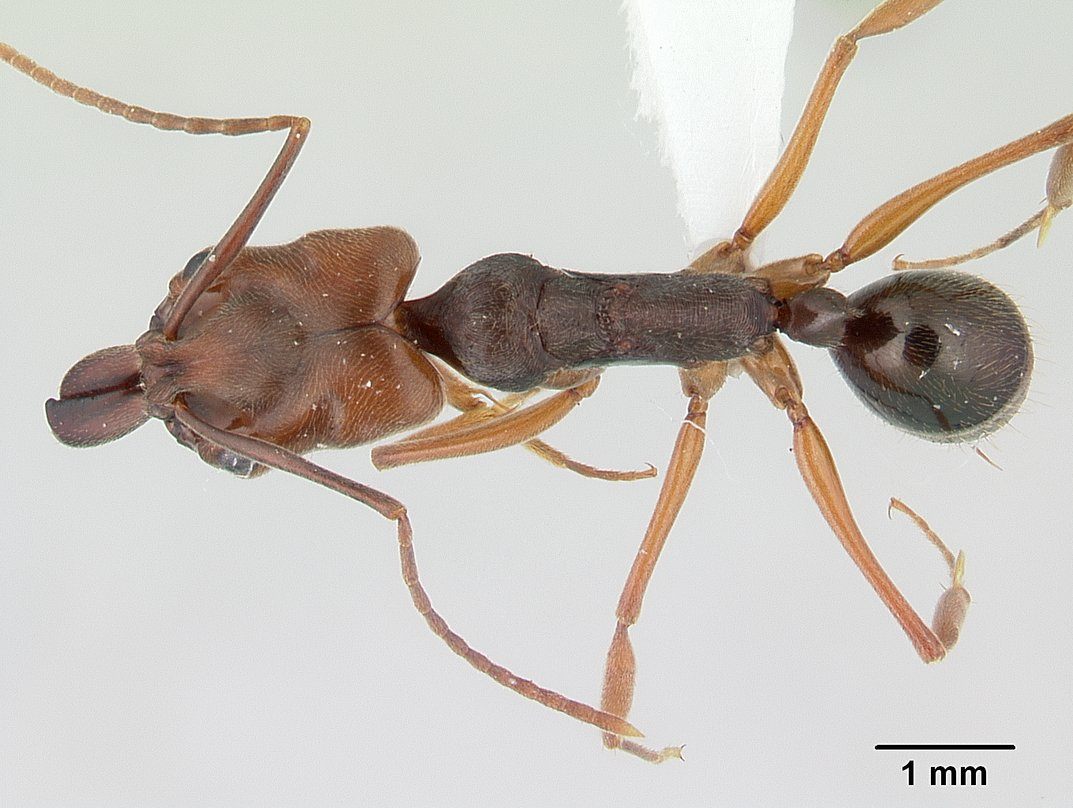

Scientific classification
- Domain: Eukaryota
- Kingdom: Animalia
- Phylum: Arthropoda
- Class: Insecta
- Order: Hymenoptera
- Family: Formicidae
- Tribe: Ponerini
- Genus: Odontomachus
- Species: O. ruginodis

Binomial name
- Odontomachus ruginodis Smith, 1937

= Odontomachus ruginodis =

Species of ant

Odontomachus ruginodis, the rough-node snapping ant, is a species of ant in the family Formicidae.

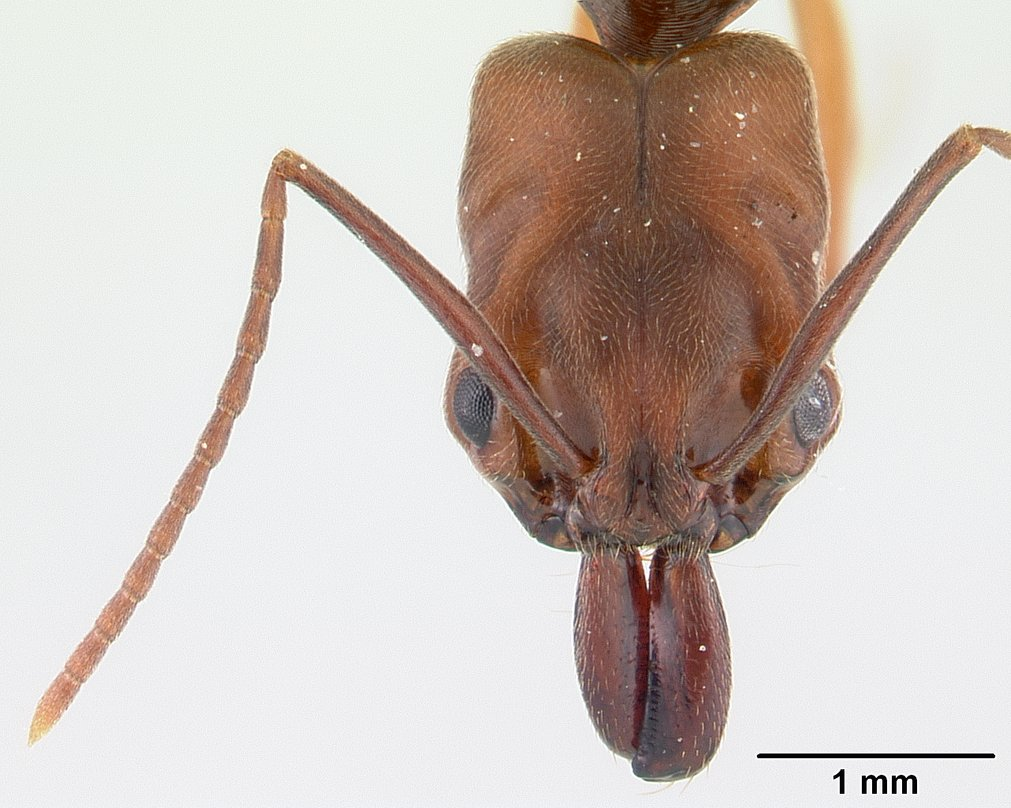
Rough-node snapping ant, Odontomachus ruginodis

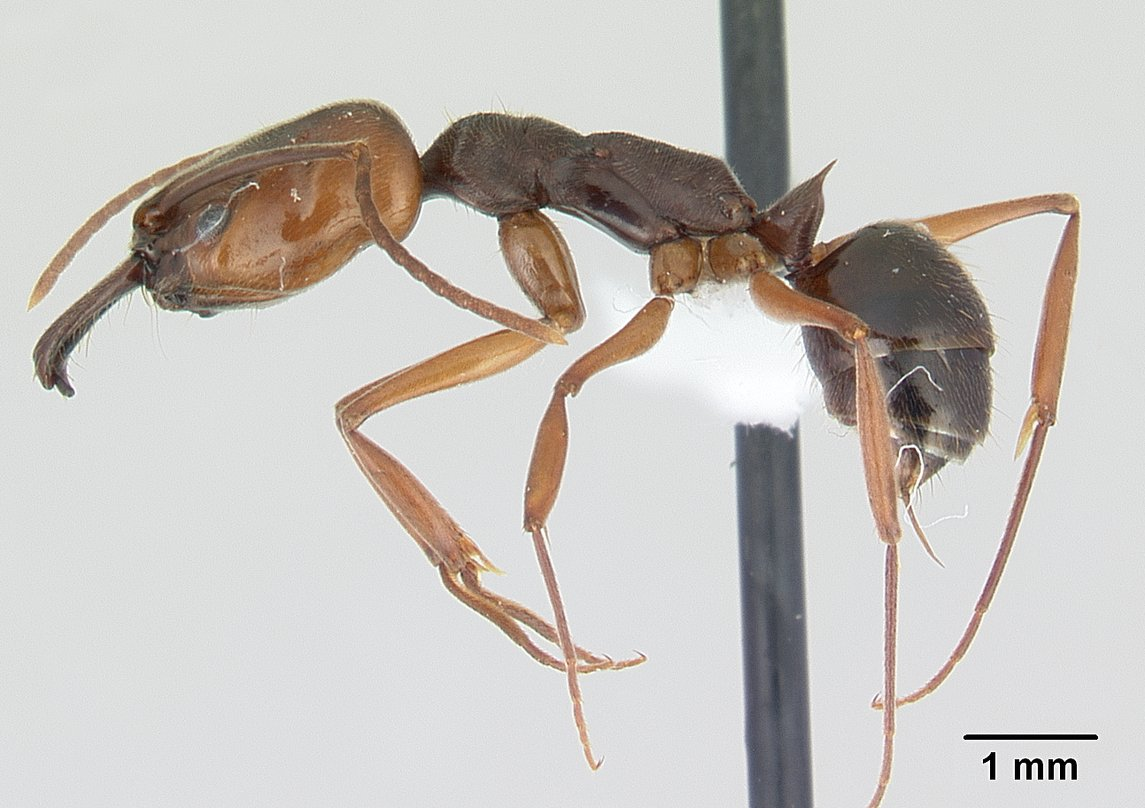
Rough-node snapping ant, Odontomachus ruginodis
