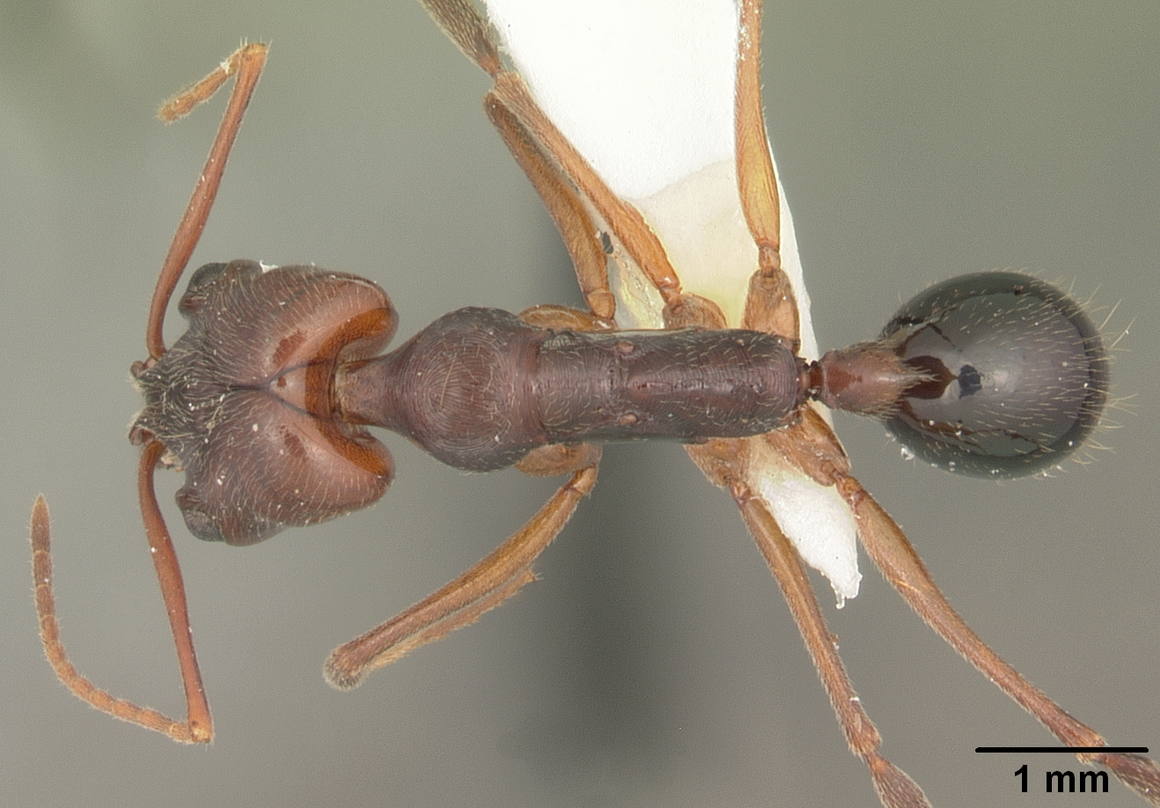

Scientific classification
- Domain: Eukaryota
- Kingdom: Animalia
- Phylum: Arthropoda
- Class: Insecta
- Order: Hymenoptera
- Family: Formicidae
- Genus: Odontomachus
- Species: O. relictus

Binomial name
- Odontomachus relictus Deyrup & Cover, 2004

= Odontomachus relictus =

Species of ant

Odontomachus relictus is a species of trapjaw ant in the subfamily Ponerinae native to Florida.

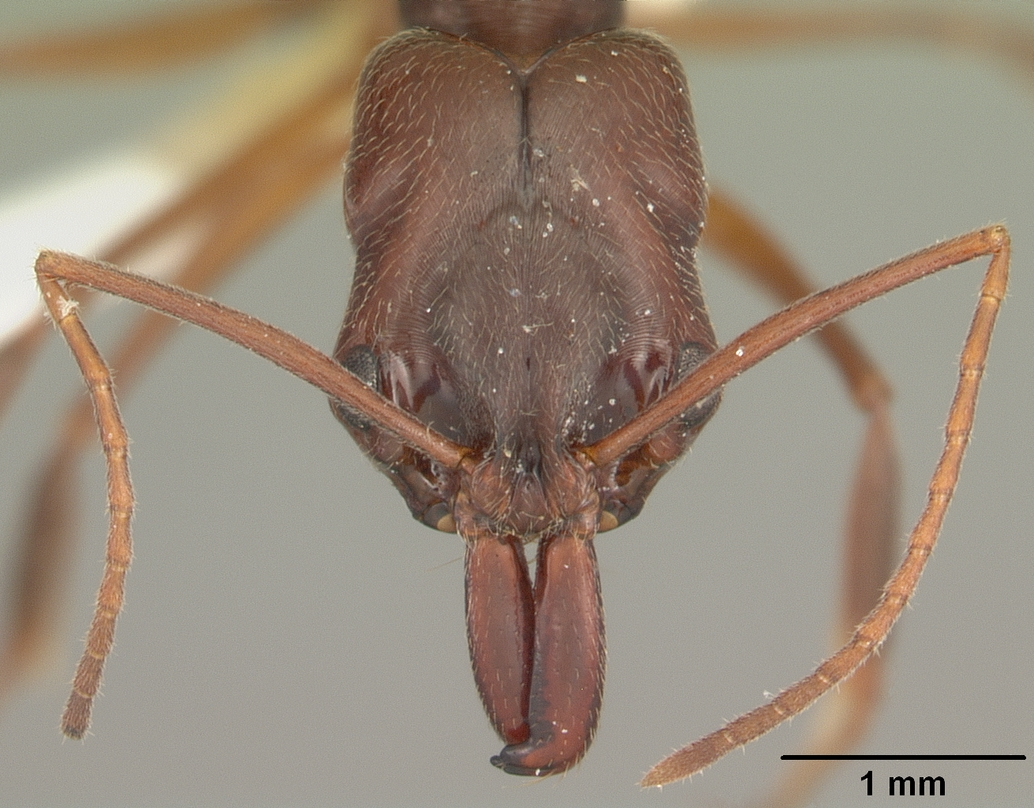

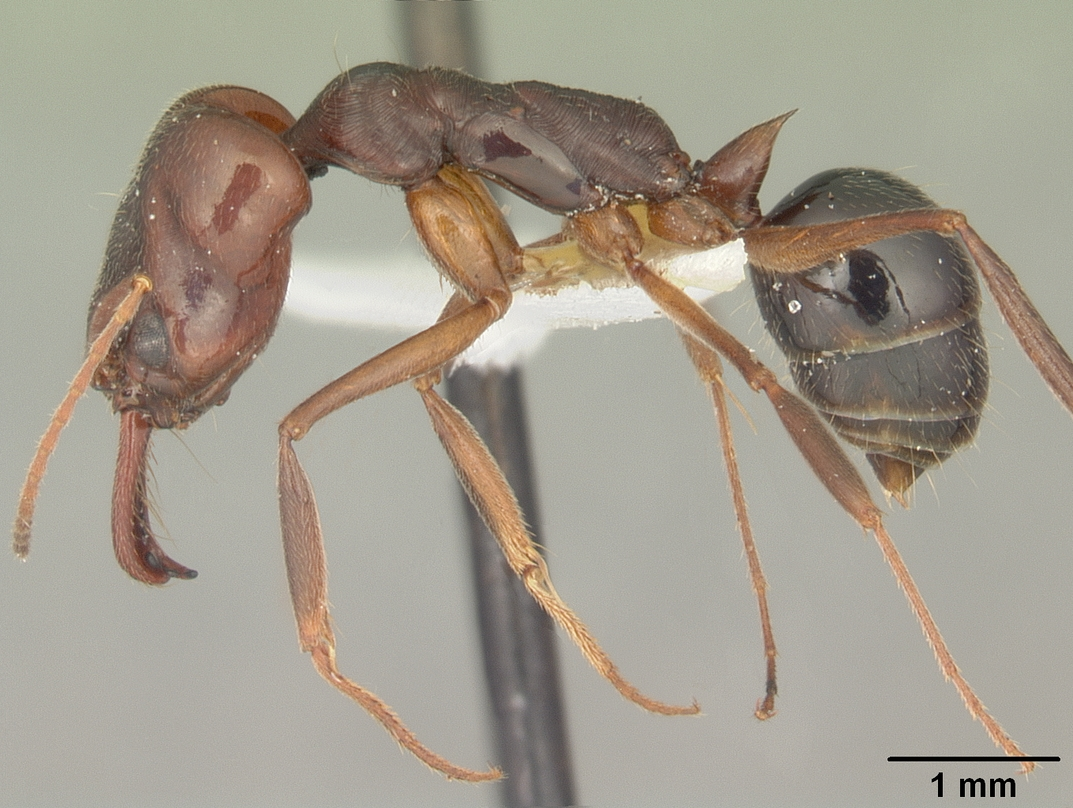
