= Odontomachus haematodus =

Scientific classification
- Kingdom: Animalia
- Phylum: Arthropoda
- Class: Insecta
- Order: Hymenoptera
- Family: Formicidae
- Genus: Odontomachus
- Species: O. haematodus

Binomial name
- Odontomachus haematodus Linnaeus 1758

Synonyms
- Formica haematoda (Linnaeus 1758),Odontomachus maxillosa (Retzius, 1783), Odontomachus hirsutiusculus Roger, 1863

Species of ant

Odontomachus haematodus is a species of trapjaw ant commonly referred to as two-spined trapjaw ant native to South America. It has since been introduced into the United States. The species typically nests in rotting wood, although in certain places the ant can nest within plants such as Aechmea aquilega. Workers forage both during the day and nocturnally, relying on the fast snapping of their jaws. It is a known predator of Thoropa taophora tadpoles.
