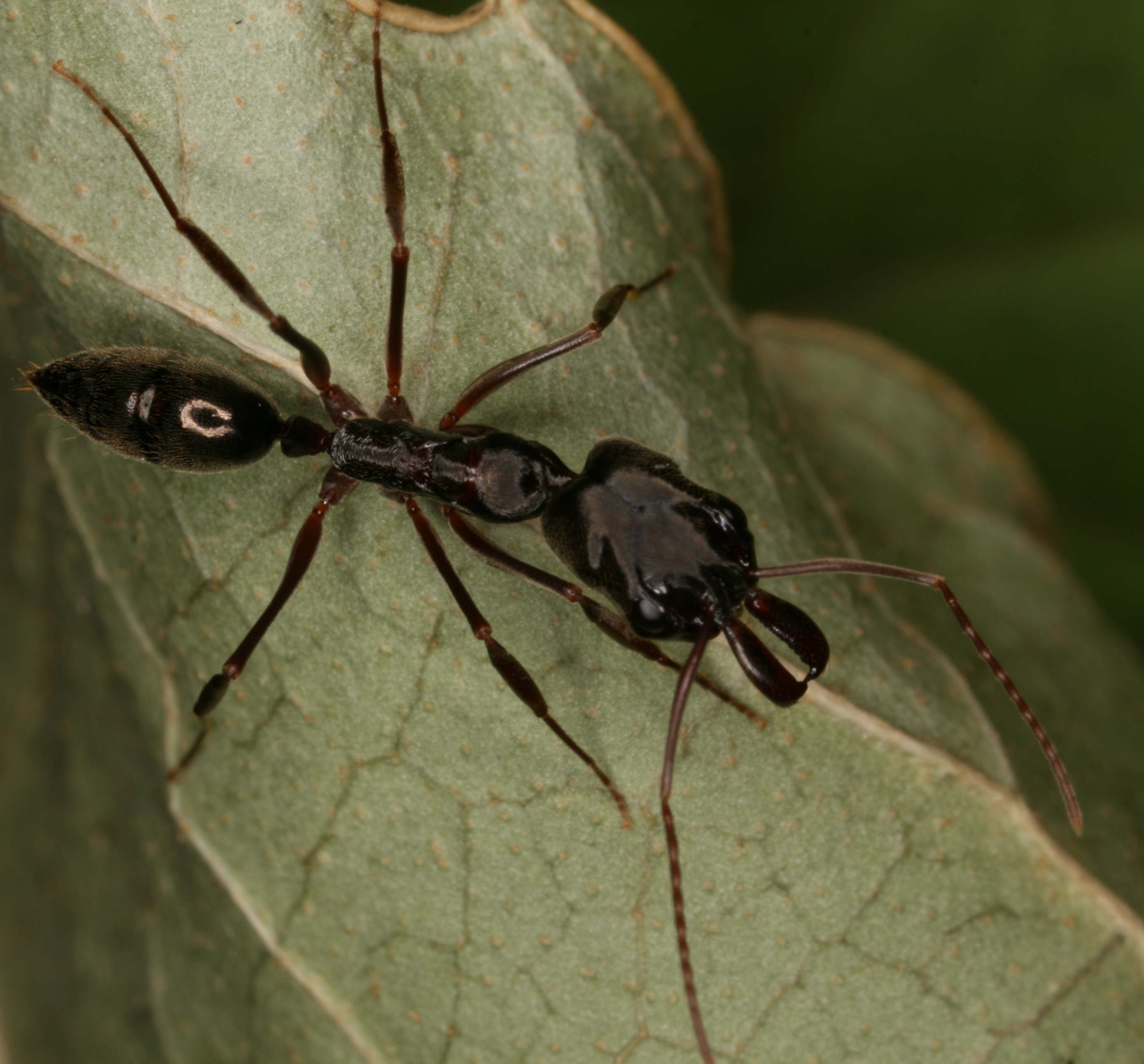

Scientific classification
- Kingdom: Animalia
- Phylum: Arthropoda
- Clade: Pancrustacea
- Class: Insecta
- Order: Hymenoptera
- Family: Formicidae
- Tribe: Ponerini
- Alliance: Grup genus Odontomachus
- Genus: Odontomachus
- Species: O. brunneus

Binomial name
- Odontomachus brunneus (Patton, 1894)

= Odontomachus brunneus =

Species of ant

Young Odontomachus brunneus queen with her first few workers in a test tube setup.

Odontomachus brunneus is a species of ant in the subfamily Ponerinae, found in the southeastern United States, parts of Central America, and the West Indies.

== Overview ==
Ants of the genus Odontomachus are commonly called trap-jaw ants, due to the large, straight mandibles, which can be opened to 180 degrees and snapped shut on prey. They tend to be pretty timid for the most part, only accepting prey it can 100% take down, while other ants such as Solenopsis will attack anything that moves. When sensory hairs on the inside of the mandibles are touched, the trap jaw is triggered. The mandibles also permit slow and fine movements for other tasks such as nest building and care of larvae. Odontomachus brunneus ants have a particular seasonal breeding cycle, where offspring are produced during the first six months of the year and none are created in the later six months. Foraging is often slow during the breeding period due to the amount of Odontomachus brunneus ants reproducing, but is doubled by the time the breeding period comes to an end.

== Speed record ==
Trap-jaw ants of this species have the fastest moving predatory appendages within the animal kingdom. One study recorded peak speeds of between 126 and 230 km/h (78 - 143 mph), with the jaws closing within just 130 microseconds on average. The peak force exerted was in the order of 300 times the body weight of the ant. The ants were also observed to use their jaws as a catapult to eject intruders or fling themselves backwards to escape a threat.
