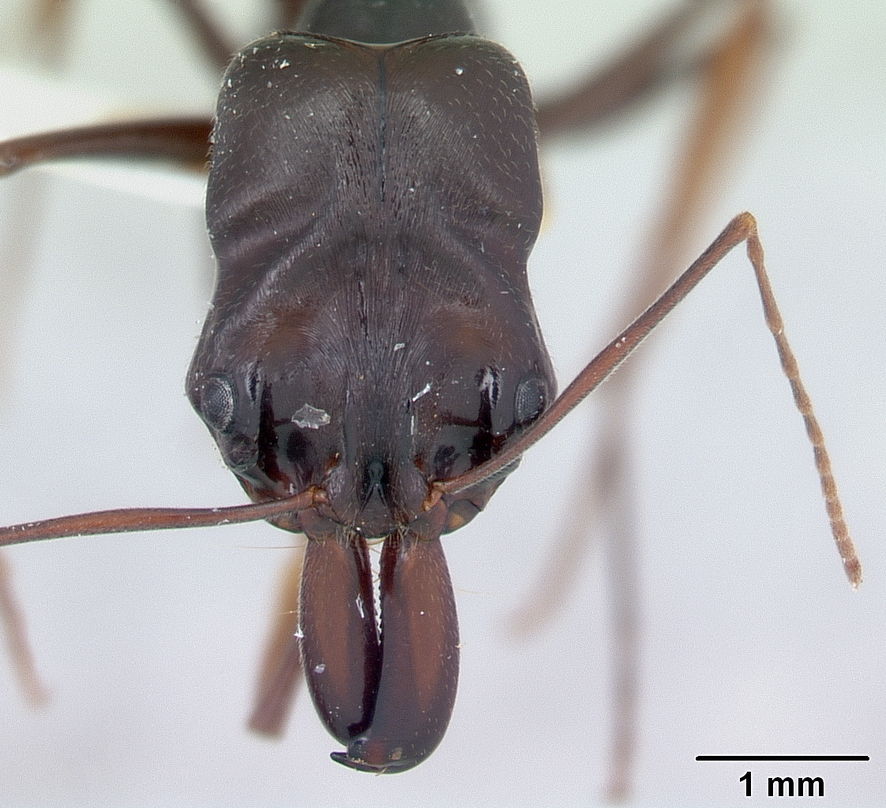
- Head showing large mandibles

Scientific classification
- Kingdom: Animalia
- Phylum: Arthropoda
- Clade: Pancrustacea
- Class: Insecta
- Order: Hymenoptera
- Family: Formicidae
- Genus: Odontomachus
- Species: O. assiniensis

Binomial name
- Odontomachus assiniensis Emery, 1892

= Odontomachus assiniensis =

Species of ant

Odontomachus assiniensis is a species of ponerinae ant known as a trap-jaw ant. The trap-jaw mechanism consists of mandibles which spring shut when triggered. This ant was first described in 1892 by the Italian entomologist Carlo Emery. The type locality is the Ivory Coast, where the coastal site of Assini, in the southeast, gIves the specific name assiniensis, "of Assini".

== Description ==
The worker ranges in length from 11 to 14 mm (0.43 to 0.55 in). It is larger than Odontomachus troglodytes, with a petiolar node that is higher and more compressed. The labial palps have four segments. The colouring varies across its large range, with most forms being some shade of brown, with brown femurs and yellowish legs. Individuals from Ghana tend to have red heads, and those from Guinea have yellow femurs and shiny black propodeums.

== Distribution and habitat ==
Odontomachus assiniensis is native to sub-Saharan Africa. Its range extends from Guinea, Ghana, Cameroun and the Congo to Kenya, Mozambique, and South Africa. It is a terrestrial forest species being found mainly in tropical rainforest and also in other moist forests, swamp forests and evergreen forests.

== Ecology ==
This terrestrial species is found on the forest floor, among leaf litter, in rotten logs, under stones and fallen timber. Nests have been reported from such places as the inside of dead wood lying on the ground, and in one instance, in the soil in coarse grassland. This nest had multiple entrances and was about 50 cm (20 in) in diameter. In this species, unmated workers can lay eggs, and these always develop into males.

These ants are predators, their diet mostly consisting of termites, but also including other small insects captured on the surface of the ground. Larger prey is stung but smaller prey is killed by a snap of the jaws.
