= Hiroshige Koyama =

Japanese botanist (1937–2016)

Hiroshige Koyama (1937–2016) was a Japanese botanist and specialist of Asteraceae.

Koyamacalia, a genus of East Asian plants in the groundsel tribe Senecioneae, was named for Koyama. It is listed as a synonym of Parasenecio.

== Works ==
- Cytotaxonomic Studies of Compositae 3: On the Species Problems in Japanese Cacalia Hastata and Its Allies by Hiroshige Koyama - 1968
- On Cacalia Yatabei and Its Related Species by Hiroshige Koyama - 1968
- Taxonomic studies on the tribe Senecioneae of Eastern Asia by Hiroshige Koyama - 1969
- Phytogeography of Some Flowering Plants of the Tsushima Islands by Hiroshige Koyama - 1970
- Blumea Conspicua, as a Species Endemic to the Ryukyu Islands by Hiroshige Koyama - 1974
- Notes on some species of Chinese Cacalia 3 by Hiroshige Koyama - 1979
- Natural history researches of the Abukuma mountains and Its Adjacent Regions by Hiroshige Koyama, Hiroshige Koyama - 1995
- Flora and Fauna of the Imperial Palace, Tokyo by Hiroshige Koyama - 2000
