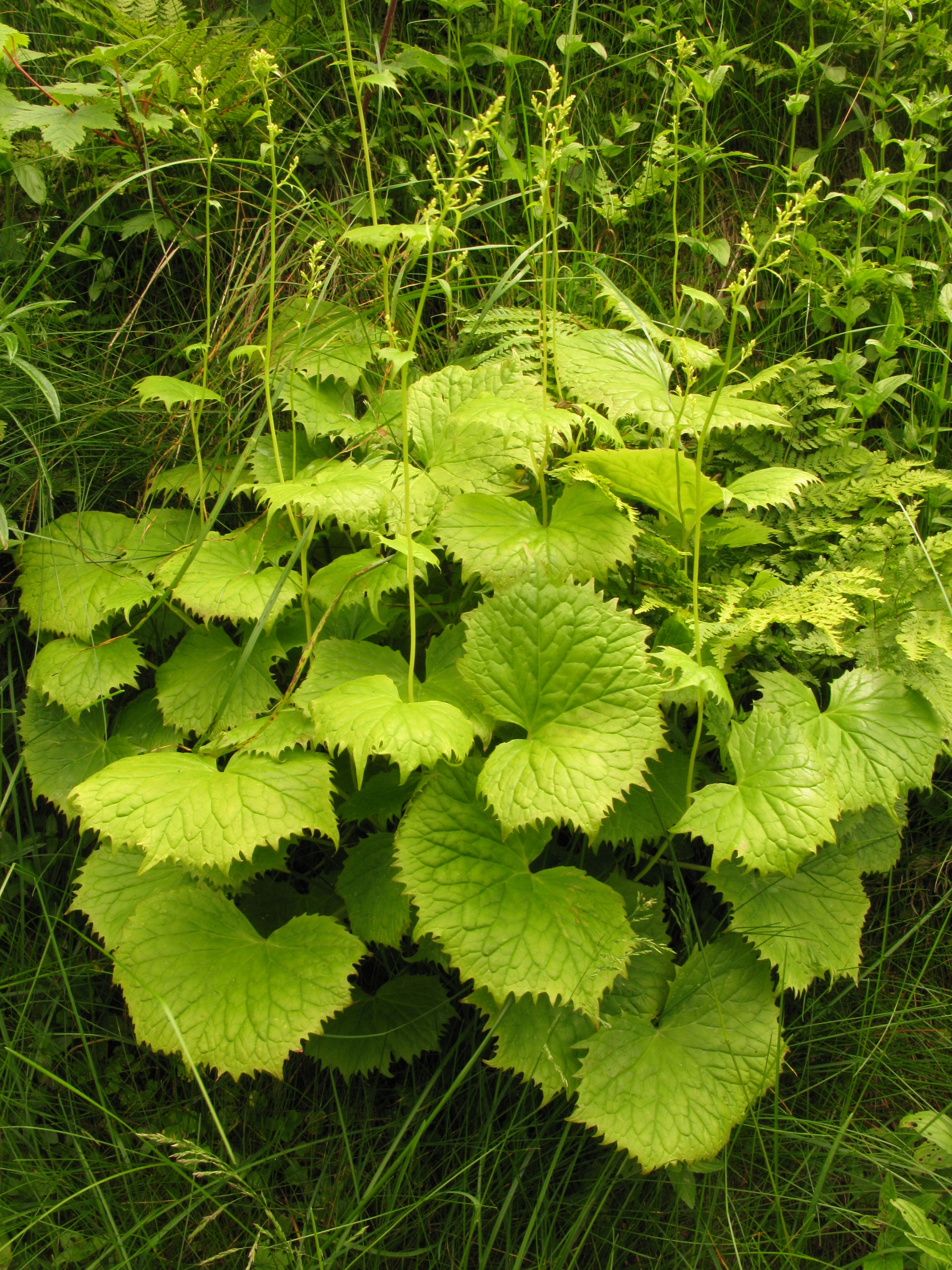
- Parasenecio adenostyloides

Scientific classification
- Kingdom: Plantae
- Clade: Embryophytes
- Clade: Tracheophytes
- Clade: Spermatophytes
- Clade: Angiosperms
- Clade: Eudicots
- Clade: Asterids
- Order: Asterales
- Family: Asteraceae
- Subfamily: Asteroideae
- Tribe: Senecioneae
- Genus: Parasenecio; W.W.Sm. & Small

Synonyms
- Koyamacalia H.Rob. & Brettell; Parasenecio sect. Koyamacalia (H.Rob. & Brettell)

= Parasenecio =

Genus of flowering plants

Parasenecio is a genus of flowering plants in the tribe Senecioneae within the family Asteraceae. Most of the species are Asian, but one (P. auriculatus) occurs in the Aleutian Islands in Alaska.

Species

- Parasenecio ×cuneatus
- Parasenecio ×shirouma-montanus
- Parasenecio adenostyloides
- Parasenecio ainsliiflorus
- Parasenecio amagiensis
- Parasenecio auriculatus
- Parasenecio begoniifolius
- Parasenecio bulbiferoides
- Parasenecio chenopodiifolius
- Parasenecio chola
- Parasenecio cyclotus
- Parasenecio dasythyrsus
- Parasenecio delphiniifolius (Japonicalia delphiniifolia)
- Parasenecio delphiniphyllus
- Parasenecio deltophyllus
- Parasenecio farfarifolius
- Parasenecio firmus
- Parasenecio forrestii
- Parasenecio gansuensis
- Parasenecio hastatus
- Parasenecio hastiformis
- Parasenecio hwangshanicus
- Parasenecio ianthophyllus
- Parasenecio jiulongensis
- Parasenecio kamtschaticus
- Parasenecio kangxianensis
- Parasenecio kiusianus (Japonicalia kiusiana)
- Parasenecio koidzumiana
- Parasenecio komarovianus
- Parasenecio koualapensis
- Parasenecio lancifolius
- Parasenecio latipes
- Parasenecio leucocephalus
- Parasenecio lidjiangensis
- Parasenecio longispicus
- Parasenecio maowenensis
- Parasenecio matsudai
- Parasenecio maximowiczianus
- Parasenecio monanthus
- Parasenecio morrisonensis
- Parasenecio nikomontanus
- Parasenecio nipponicus
- Parasenecio nokoensis
- Parasenecio otopteryx
- Parasenecio palmatisectus
- Parasenecio peltifolius
- Parasenecio petasitoides
- Parasenecio phyllolepis
- Parasenecio pilgerianus
- Parasenecio praetermissus
- Parasenecio profundorum
- Parasenecio quinquelobus
- Parasenecio roborowskii
- Parasenecio rockianus
- Parasenecio rubescens
- Parasenecio rufipilis
- Parasenecio shikokianus
- Parasenecio shiroumensis
- Parasenecio sinicus
- Parasenecio souliei
- Parasenecio subglaber
- Parasenecio taliensis
- Parasenecio tebakoensis (Japonicalia tebakoensis)
- Parasenecio tenianus
- Parasenecio tripteris
- Parasenecio tsinlingensis
- Parasenecio vespertilo
- Parasenecio weiningensis
- Parasenecio xinjiashanensis
- Parasenecio yakusimensis
- Parasenecio yatabei
