= Oxyopes cornutus =

Scientific classification
- Kingdom: Animalia
- Phylum: Arthropoda
- Subphylum: Chelicerata
- Class: Arachnida
- Order: Araneae
- Infraorder: Araneomorphae
- Family: Oxyopidae
- Genus: Oxyopes
- Species: O. cornutus

Binomial name
- Oxyopes cornutus F. O. Pickard-Cambridge, 1902

Species of spider

Oxyopes cornutus is a species of lynx spider documented first by F. O. Pickard-Cambridge in 1902, and found in Mexico.
