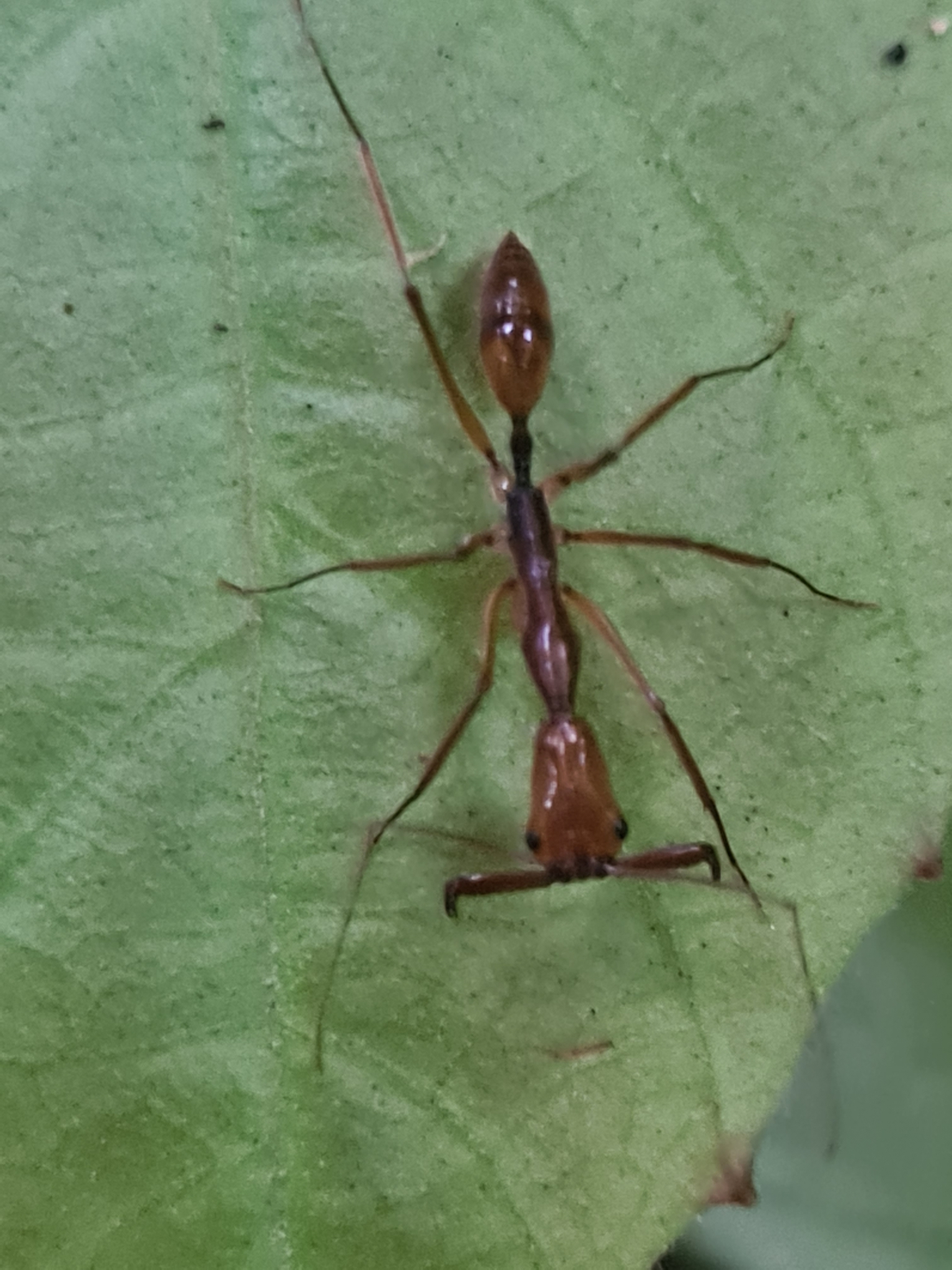

Scientific classification
- Domain: Eukaryota
- Kingdom: Animalia
- Phylum: Arthropoda
- Class: Insecta
- Order: Hymenoptera
- Family: Formicidae
- Genus: Odontomachus
- Species: O. hastatus

Binomial name
- Odontomachus hastatus (Fabricius, 1804)

= Odontomachus hastatus =

Species of ant

Odontomachus hastatus is a species of ant from the complex Odontomachus hastatus, The species was originally described by Johan Christian Fabricius in 1804.

== Description ==
Like other species of Odontomachus ants, the O. hastatus are easily recognised by their trap-like jaw, which with they catch and kill prey.

== Distribution ==
The range of O. hastatus covers the rainforests of Central and South America. This is confirmed in recent observations through crowdsourcing initiatives
