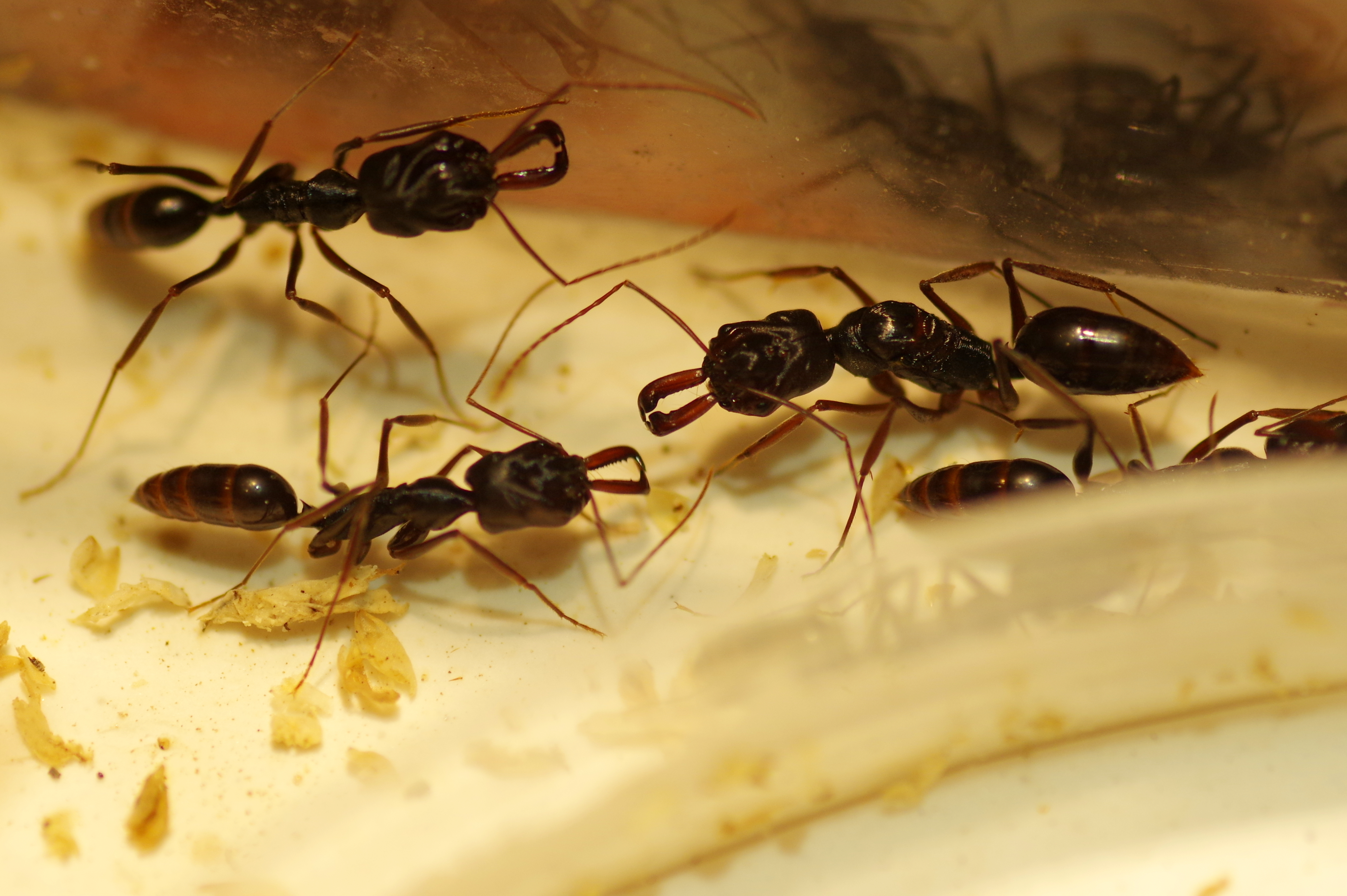
- Odontomachus monticola

Scientific classification
- Kingdom: Animalia
- Phylum: Arthropoda
- Class: Insecta
- Order: Hymenoptera
- Family: Formicidae
- Subfamily: Ponerinae
- Tribe: Ponerini
- Alliance: Odontomachus genus group
- Genus: Odontomachus; Latreille, 1804

Type species
- Formica haematoda (Linnaeus, 1758)

Diversity
- 73 species

Synonyms
- Champsomyrmex Emery, 1892; Myrtoteras Matsumura, 1912; Pedetes Bernstein, 1861

= Odontomachus =

Genus of ants

Odontomachus is a genus of ants commonly called trap-jaw ants found in the tropics and subtropics throughout the world.

== Overview ==
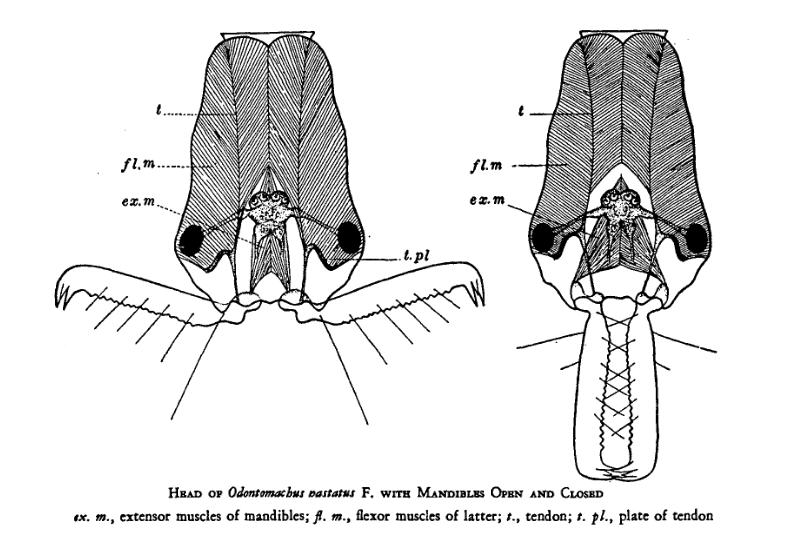
Head of O. hastatus

Commonly known as trap-jaw ants, species in Odontomachus have a pair of large, straight mandibles capable of opening 180°. These jaws are locked in place by an internal mechanism, and can snap shut on prey or objects when sensory hairs on the inside of the mandibles are touched. The mandibles are powerful and fast, giving the ant its common name. The mandibles either kill or maim the prey, allowing the ant to bring it back to the nest. Odontomachus ants can simply lock and snap their jaws again if one bite is not enough, or to cut off bits of larger food. The mandibles also permit slow and fine movements for other tasks such as nest building and care of larvae. The ants were also observed to use their jaws as a catapult to eject intruders or fling themselves backwards to escape a threat.

The larvae of trap-jaw ants are remarkable in being ornamented with long spikes and presenting dorsal adhesive pads for fixation onto internal ant nest walls. They are carnivorous, extremely active larvae. Apparently, they undergo three larval moults before entering metamorphosis. Their larvae use substrate to spin cocoons.

== Diet ==
Trap-jaw ants are mostly carnivorous, but also consume nectar, insect honeydew, and ripe fruit.

== Speed record ==
Trap-jaw ants of this genus have the second-fastest moving predatory appendages within the animal kingdom, after the dracula ant (Mystrium camillae). One study of Odontomachus bauri recorded peak speeds between 126 and 230 km/h (78 and 143 mph), with the jaws closing within just 130 microseconds on average. The peak force exerted was in the order of 300 times the body weight of the ant, and acceleration of 1,000,000 m/s² or 100,000 g.

== Mimicry ==
The jumping spider genus Enoplomischus seems to mimic this ant genus.

== Distribution ==
Odontomachus species are found in Central and South America, Asia, Australia, and Africa.

In the United States, O. haematodus was "recorded in Alabama back in 1956, but now researchers have officially confirmed that the species has spread across the Gulf Coast, at least as far east as Pensacola, Florida." In the past, O. ruginodis was thought to be confined to the Orlando region, but Magdalena Sorger, a PhD candidate at North Carolina State University, has confirmed a record of O. ruginodis more than 100 miles north of Orlando, in Gainesville, Florida. Odontomachus relictus, however, is only found in "endangered scrub habitat on central Florida’s ancient sand ridges."

== Species ==
As of 2026, the genus contains 84 valid species, 80 of which are extant and four extinct.

=== Extant ===
- Odontomachus aciculatus F. Smith, 1863
- Odontomachus affinis Guerin-Meneville, 1844
- Odontomachus alius Sorger & Zettel, 2011
- Odontomachus allolabis Kempf, 1974
- Odontomachus ampipitbaybay Acuña & Mapile, 2024
- Odontomachus angulatus Mayr, 1866
- Odontomachus animosus Smith, 1860
- Odontomachus assiniensis Emery, 1892
- Odontomachus banksi Forel, 1910
- Odontomachus bauri Emery, 1892
- Odontomachus biolleyi Forel, 1908
- Odontomachus biumbonatus Brown, 1976
- Odontomachus bradleyi Brown, 1976
- Odontomachus brunneus (Patton, 1894)
- Odontomachus caelatus Brown, 1976
- Odontomachus cephalotes Smith, 1863
- Odontomachus chelifer (Latreille, 1802)
- Odontomachus chicomendesi França et al., 2024
- Odontomachus circulus Wang, 1993
- Odontomachus clarus Roger, 1861
- Odontomachus coquereli Roger, 1861
- Odontomachus cornutus Stitz, 1933
- Odontomachus cupreus França et al., 2024
- Odontomachus davidsoni Hoenle et al., 2020
- Odontomachus desertorum Wheeler, 1915
- Odontomachus dubius França et al., 2024
- Odontomachus erythrocephalus Emery, 1890
- Odontomachus ferminae General, 2018
- Odontomachus floresensis Brown, 1976
- Odontomachus fulgidus Wang, 1993
- Odontomachus goumang Qi & Zhi, 2025
- Odontomachus granatus Wang, 1993
- Odontomachus haematodus (Linnaeus, 1758)
- Odontomachus hastatus (Fabricius, 1804)
- Odontomachus imperator Emery, 1887
- Odontomachus infandus Smith, 1858
- Odontomachus insularis Guérin-Méneville, 1844
- Odontomachus kuroiwae (Matsumura, 1912)
- Odontomachus laticeps Roger, 1861
- Odontomachus latidens Mayr, 1867
- Odontomachus latissimus Viehmeyer, 1914
- Odontomachus linearis Chen & Zhou, 2018
- Odontomachus litoralis Wang et al., 2020
- Odontomachus malignus Smith, 1859
- Odontomachus meinerti Forel, 1905
- Odontomachus minangkabau Satria et al., 2015
- Odontomachus montanus Stitz, 1925
- Odontomachus monticola Emery, 1892
- Odontomachus mormo Brown, 1976
- Odontomachus nigriceps Smith, 1860
- Odontomachus opaciventris Forel, 1899
- Odontomachus opaculus Viehmeyer, 1912
- Odontomachus panamensis Forel, 1899
- Odontomachus pangantihoni Zettel & Sorger, 2023
- Odontomachus papuanus Emery, 1887
- Odontomachus pararixosus Terayama & Ito, 2014
- Odontomachus philippinus Emery, 1893
- Odontomachus procerus Emery, 1893
- Odontomachus relictus Deyrup & Cover, 2004
- Odontomachus rixosus Smith, 1857
- Odontomachus ruficeps Smith, 1858
- Odontomachus rufithorax Emery, 1911
- Odontomachus ruginodis Smith, 1937
- Odontomachus saevissimus Smith, 1858
- Odontomachus scalptus Brown, 1978
- Odontomachus schoedli Sorger & Zettel, 2011
- Odontomachus scifictus Sorger & Zettel, 2011
- Odontomachus silvestrii W.M. Wheeler, 1927
- Odontomachus simillimus F. Smith, 1858
- Odontomachus spissus Kempf, 1962
- Odontomachus sumbensis Brown, 1976
- Odontomachus tensus Wang, 1993
- Odontomachus testaceus Emery, 1897
- Odontomachus troglodytes Santschi, 1914
- Odontomachus turneri Forel, 1900
- Odontomachus tyrannicus Smith, 1859
- Odontomachus xeta França et al., 2024
- Odontomachus xizangensis Wang, 1993
- Odontomachus yamanei Zettel & Sorger, 2023
- Odontomachus yucatecus Brown, 1976

=== Extinct ===
- †Odontomachus angulops França & Gomes, 2025
- †Odontomachus paleomyagra Wappler et al., 2014
- †Odontomachus pseudobauri (De Andrade, 1994)
- †Odontomachus spinifer De Andrade, 1994

=== Unidentifiable ===
One species tentatively placed within the genus has subsequently been determined as unidentifiable to the species level, although it technically remains a valid binomen.

- Odontomachus peruanus Stitz, 1933
