= Odontomachus cornutus =

Scientific classification
- Kingdom: Animalia
- Phylum: Arthropoda
- Clade: Pancrustacea
- Class: Insecta
- Order: Hymenoptera
- Family: Formicidae
- Genus: Odontomachus
- Species: O. cornutus

Binomial name
- Odontomachus cornutus Stitz, 1933

Species of ant

Odontomachus cornutus is a species of ant in the Ponerinae subfamily.
