= Amphisbaena hastata =

Scientific classification
- Domain: Eukaryota
- Kingdom: Animalia
- Phylum: Chordata
- Class: Reptilia
- Order: Squamata
- Clade: Amphisbaenia
- Family: Amphisbaenidae
- Genus: Amphisbaena
- Species: A. hastata

Binomial name
- Amphisbaena hastata Vanzolini, 1991

Species of lizard

Amphisbaena hastata is a worm lizard species in the genus Amphisbaena.

== Etymology ==
The specific name, hastata, is Latin for "spear-shaped".

== Geographic range ==
It is found in Brazil in the state of Bahia.

== See also ==
- List of reptiles of Brazil
