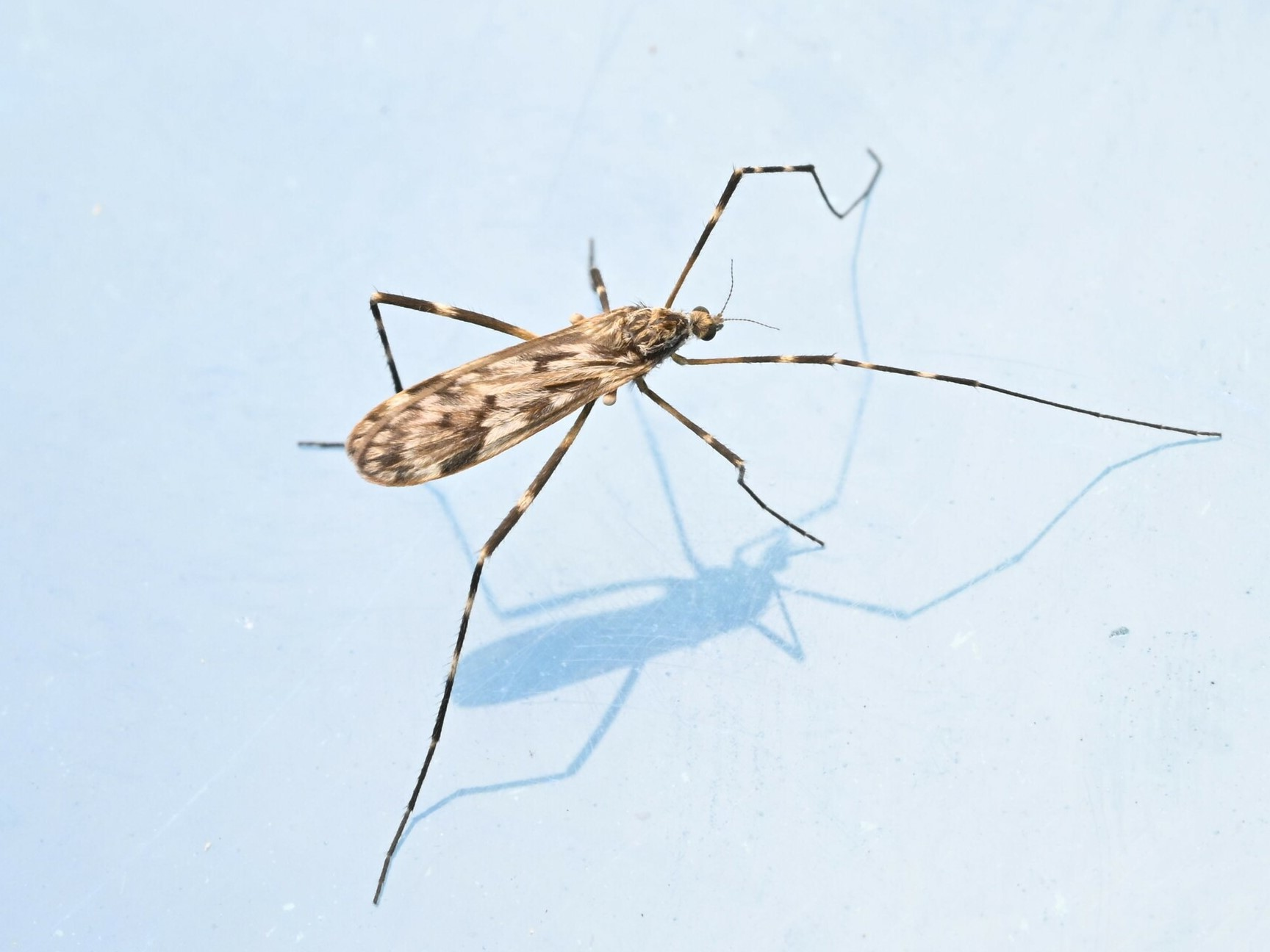
- Amphineurus perdecorus

Scientific classification
- Domain: Eukaryota
- Kingdom: Animalia
- Phylum: Arthropoda
- Class: Insecta
- Order: Diptera
- Family: Limoniidae
- Subfamily: Chioneinae
- Genus: Amphineurus; Skuse, 1890

Type species
- Rhypholophus umbraticus Skuse, 1890

Subgenera
- Amphineurus Skuse, 1890; Nesormosia Alexander, 1923; Nothormosia Alexander, 1923; Rhamphoneurus Alexander, 1929

= Amphineurus =

Genus of flies

Amphineurus is a genus of crane fly in the family Limoniidae.

== Species ==
- Subgenus Amphineurus Skuse, 1890
  - A. bicinctus Edwards, 1923
  - A. bickeli Theischinger, 1996
  - A. bicorniger Alexander, 1924
  - A. breviclavus Alexander, 1924
  - A. campbelli Alexander, 1922
  - A. castroensis Alexander, 1929
  - A. collessi Theischinger, 1994
  - A. cyathetanus Alexander, 1952
  - A. fergusoni Alexander, 1931
  - A. flexuosus Alexander, 1923
  - A. hudsoni Edwards, 1923
  - A. kandu Theischinger, 1994
  - A. kingi Alexander, 1950
  - A. koghiensis Hynes, 1993
  - A. leaski Theischinger, 1996
  - A. longipes (Philippi, 1866)
  - A. lyriformis Alexander, 1923
  - A. maculosus (Skuse, 1890)
  - A. minor Alexander, 1923
  - A. minusculus Alexander, 1921
  - A. molophilinus Alexander, 1922
  - A. monteithi Theischinger, 1994
  - A. nox Alexander, 1922
  - A. operculatus Alexander, 1924
  - A. patya Theischinger, 1994
  - A. perarmatus Alexander, 1924
  - A. perdecorus Edwards, 1923
  - A. pita Theischinger, 1994
  - A. polycyclus Alexander, 1961
  - A. pressus Alexander, 1922
  - A. pulchripes Alexander, 1925
  - A. pullybuntor Theischinger, 1994
  - A. senex Alexander, 1922
  - A. spectabilis Theischinger, 1996
  - A. stewartiae Alexander, 1924
  - A. subdecorus Edwards, 1924
  - A. submolophilinus Alexander, 1923
  - A. superbus Theischinger, 1996
  - A. tenuipollex Alexander, 1952
  - A. tumidus Alexander, 1923
  - A. umbraticus (Skuse, 1890)
  - A. zborowskii Theischinger, 1996
- Subgenus Nesormosia Alexander, 1923
  - A. fatuus (Hutton, 1902)
  - A. niveinervis Edwards, 1923
  - A. ochroplaca Alexander, 1925
  - A. subfatuus Alexander, 1922
- Subgenus Nothormosia Alexander, 1923
  - A. blackballensis Alexander, 1953
  - A. cacoxenus Alexander, 1925
  - A. edentulus Alexander, 1939
  - A. fimbriatulus Alexander, 1925
  - A. gracilisentis Alexander, 1922
  - A. harrisi Alexander, 1922
  - A. hastatus Alexander, 1925
  - A. horni Edwards, 1923
  - A. insulsus (Hutton, 1902)
  - A. longi Alexander, 1950
  - A. meridionalis Alexander, 1924
  - A. nothofagi Alexander, 1925
  - A. otagensis Alexander, 1922
  - A. patruelis Alexander, 1925
  - A. recurvans Alexander, 1922
  - A. spinulistylus Alexander, 1925
  - A. subglaber Edwards, 1923
  - A. tortuosus Alexander, 1923
- Subgenus Rhamphoneurus Alexander, 1929
  - A. alexanderi Santos, Santos & Ribeiro, 2022
  - A. amorimi Santos, Santos & Ribeiro, 2022
  - A. anchoralis Santos, Santos & Ribeiro, 2022
  - A. anfractus Santos, Santos & Ribeiro, 2022
  - A. apiculatus Alexander, 1968
  - A. billinghami Santos, Santos & Ribeiro, 2022
  - A. caleuchus Santos, Santos & Ribeiro, 2022
  - A. chiloeanus Alexander, 1969
  - A. deceptus Santos, Santos & Ribeiro, 2022
  - A. extraordinarius Alexander, 1939
  - A. falcatus Santos, Santos & Ribeiro, 2022
  - A. glabristylatus Alexander, 1929
  - A. immaculatus Santos, Santos & Ribeiro, 2022
  - A. insanus Alexander, 1952
  - A. morphyi Santos, Santos & Ribeiro, 2022
  - A. nonnullus Alexander, 1967
  - A. nothofagetorum Alexander, 1929
  - A. nullus Alexander, 1967
  - A. oosterbroeki Santos, Santos & Ribeiro, 2022
  - A. podenasi Santos, Santos & Ribeiro, 2022
  - A. rutristylus Alexander, 1968
  - A. sanus Alexander, 1929
  - A. stigmaticus Santos, Santos & Ribeiro, 2022
  - A. theischingeri Santos, Santos & Ribeiro, 2022
  - A. triangularis Santos, Santos & Ribeiro, 2022
