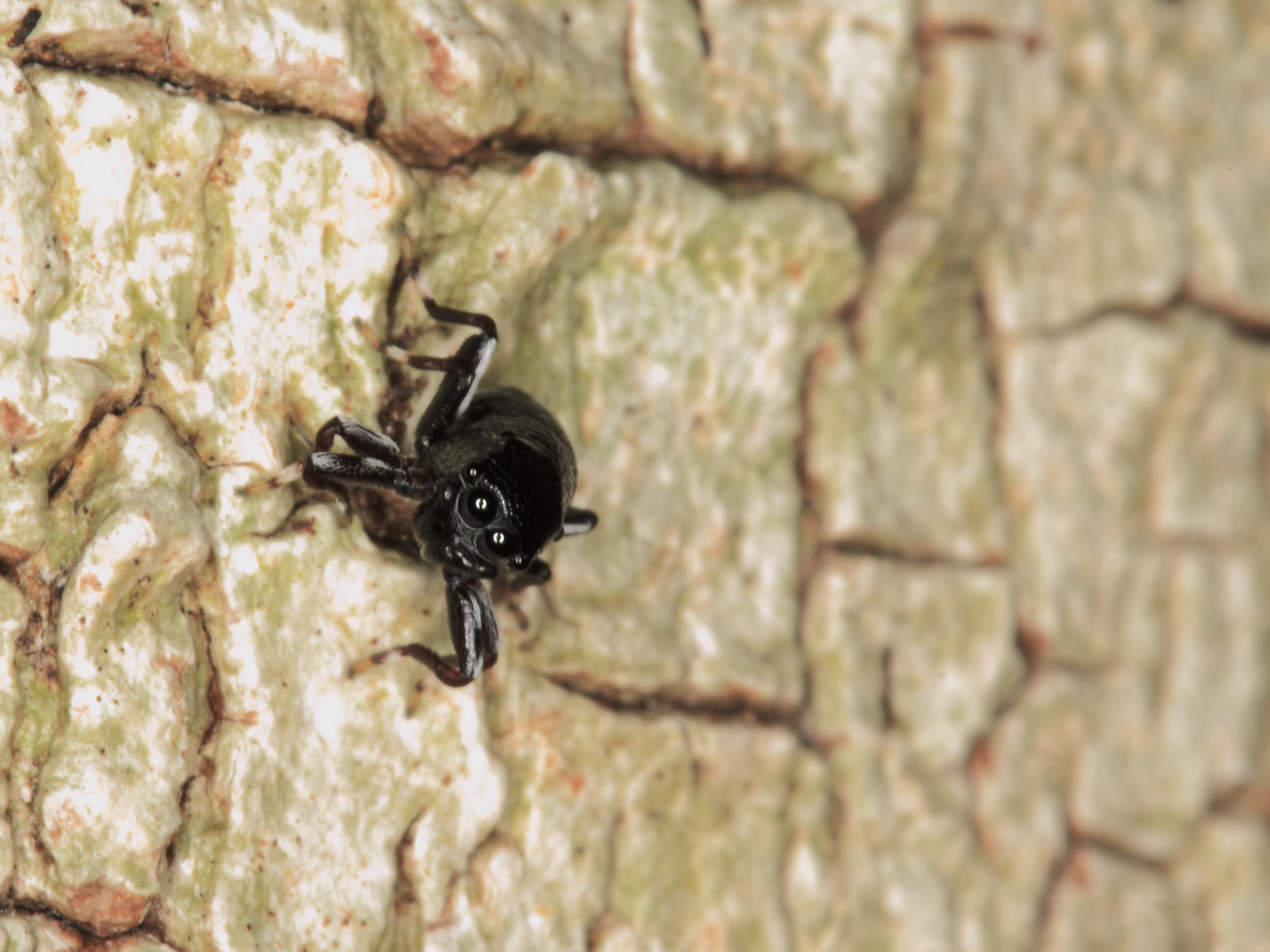

Scientific classification
- Kingdom: Animalia
- Phylum: Arthropoda
- Subphylum: Chelicerata
- Class: Arachnida
- Order: Araneae
- Infraorder: Araneomorphae
- Family: Salticidae
- Subfamily: Salticinae
- Genus: Coccorchestes; Thorell, 1881

Type species
- C. rufipes Thorell, 1881

Species
- 40, see text

= Coccorchestes =

Genus of spiders

Coccorchestes is a genus of South Pacific jumping spiders that was first described by Tamerlan Thorell in 1881.

== Species ==
As of June 2019 it contains forty species, almost all occurring in Papua New Guinea, with one species found in Australia and one in New Britain:

- Coccorchestes aiyura Balogh, 1980 – New Guinea
- Coccorchestes biak Balogh, 1980 – New Guinea
- Coccorchestes biroi Balogh, 1980 – New Guinea
- Coccorchestes blendae Thorell, 1881 – New Guinea
- Coccorchestes buszkoae Prószyński, 1971 – New Guinea
- Coccorchestes clavifemur Balogh, 1979 – New Guinea
- Coccorchestes fenicheli Balogh, 1980 – New Guinea
- Coccorchestes ferreus Griswold, 1984 – Australia (Queensland)
- Coccorchestes fluviatilis Balogh, 1980 – New Guinea
- Coccorchestes giluwe Balogh, 1980 – New Guinea
- Coccorchestes gressitti Balogh, 1979 – New Guinea
- Coccorchestes hamatus Balogh, 1980 – New Guinea
- Coccorchestes hastatus Balogh, 1980 – New Guinea
- Coccorchestes huon Balogh, 1980 – New Guinea
- Coccorchestes ifar Balogh, 1980 – New Guinea
- Coccorchestes ildikoae Balogh, 1979 – New Guinea
- Coccorchestes inermis Balogh, 1980 – Papua New Guinea (New Britain)
- Coccorchestes jahilnickii Prószyński, 1971 – New Guinea
- Coccorchestes jimmi Balogh, 1980 – New Guinea
- Coccorchestes kaindi Balogh, 1980 – New Guinea
- Coccorchestes karimui Balogh, 1980 – New Guinea
- Coccorchestes mcadami Balogh, 1980 – New Guinea
- Coccorchestes missim Balogh, 1980 – New Guinea
- Coccorchestes otto Balogh, 1980 – New Guinea
- Coccorchestes piora Balogh, 1980 – New Guinea
- Coccorchestes quinquespinosus Balogh, 1980 – New Guinea
- Coccorchestes rufipes Thorell, 1881 (type) – New Guinea
- Coccorchestes sinofi Balogh, 1980 – New Guinea
- Coccorchestes sirunki Balogh, 1980 – New Guinea
- Coccorchestes staregai Prószyński, 1971 – New Guinea
- Coccorchestes suspectus Balogh, 1980 – New Guinea
- Coccorchestes szentivanyi Balogh, 1980 – New Guinea
- Coccorchestes taeniatus Balogh, 1980 – New Guinea
- Coccorchestes tapini Balogh, 1980 – New Guinea
- Coccorchestes triplex Balogh, 1980 – New Guinea
- Coccorchestes vanapa Balogh, 1980 – New Guinea
- Coccorchestes verticillatus Balogh, 1980 – New Guinea
- Coccorchestes vicinus Balogh, 1980 – New Guinea
- Coccorchestes vogelkop Balogh, 1980 – New Guinea
- Coccorchestes waris Balogh, 1980 – New Guinea
