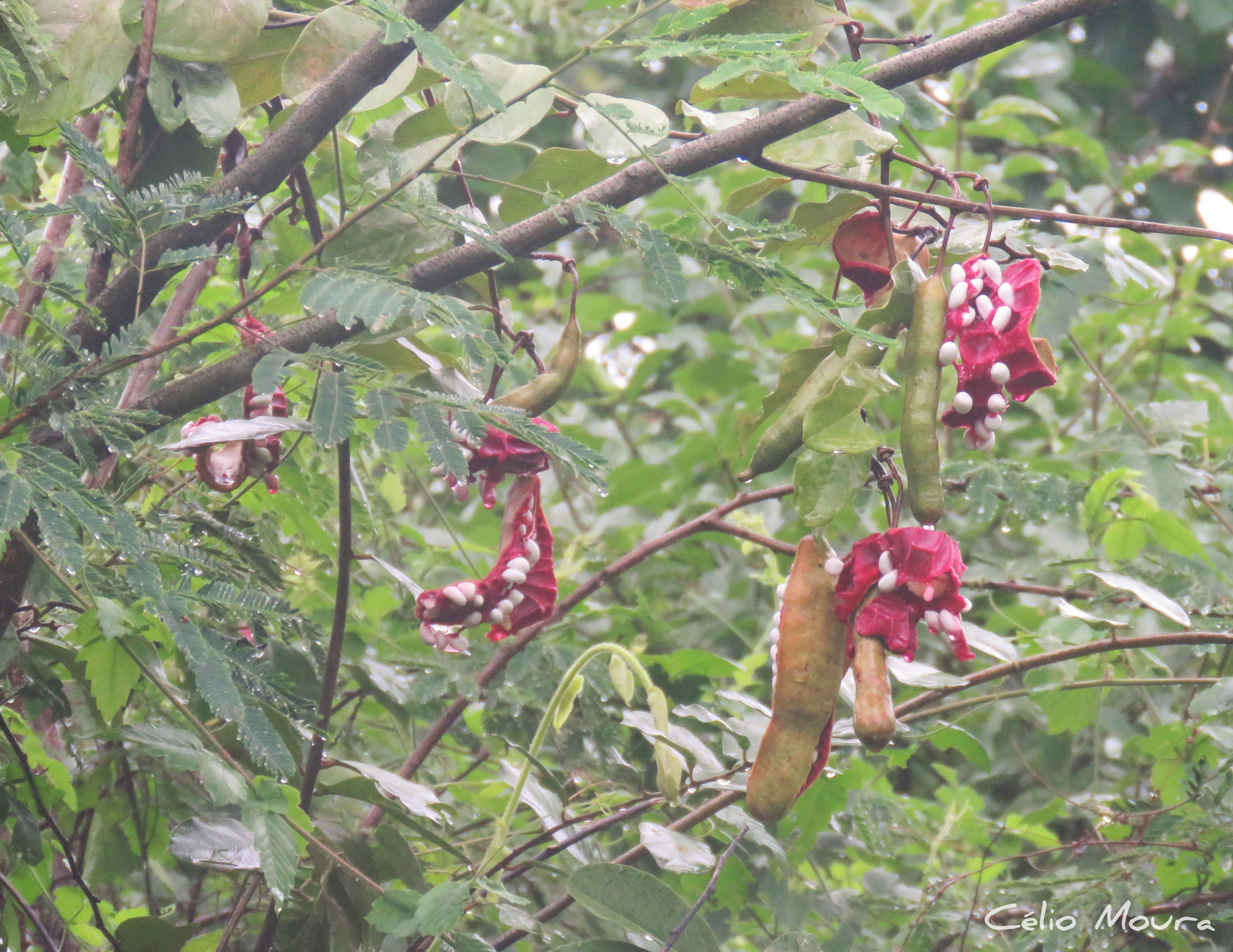

Conservation status
- Least Concern (IUCN 3.1)

Scientific classification
- Kingdom: Plantae
- Clade: Tracheophytes
- Clade: Angiosperms
- Clade: Eudicots
- Clade: Rosids
- Order: Brassicales
- Family: Capparaceae
- Genus: Morisonia
- Species: M. hastata

Binomial name
- Morisonia hastata (Jacq.) Christenh. & Byng (2018)

Synonyms
- Capparis coccolobifolia Mart. ex Eichler (1865); Capparis collina J.R.Johnst. (1905); Capparis flexuosa f. hastata (Jacq.) Dugand (1941); Capparis hastata Jacq. (1760); Capparis latifolia (Griseb.) A.Stahl (1884); Cynophalla hastata (Jacq.) J.Presl (1825)

= Morisonia hastata =

Species of flowering plant

Morisonia hastata is a species of flowering plant in the caper family, Capparaceae. It is a tree native to the tropical Americas, including the Caribbean, Venezuela, Colombia, and eastern Brazil.
