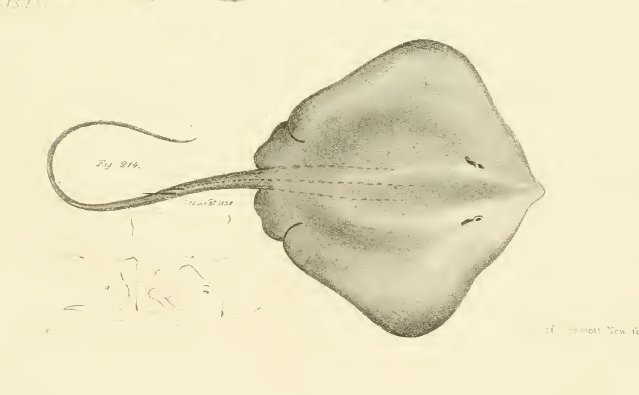

Scientific classification
- Kingdom: Animalia
- Phylum: Chordata
- Class: Chondrichthyes
- Subclass: Elasmobranchii
- Order: Myliobatiformes
- Family: Dasyatidae
- Genus: Dasyatis
- Species: D. hastata

Binomial name
- Dasyatis hastata (DeKay, 1842)

Synonyms
- Pastinaca hastata DeKay, 1842

= Dasyatis hastata =

Species of cartilaginous fish

Dasyatis hastata is a species of stingray in the family Dasyatidae. Some authors regard this species as a synonym of the roughtail stingray (Bathytoshia centroura).
