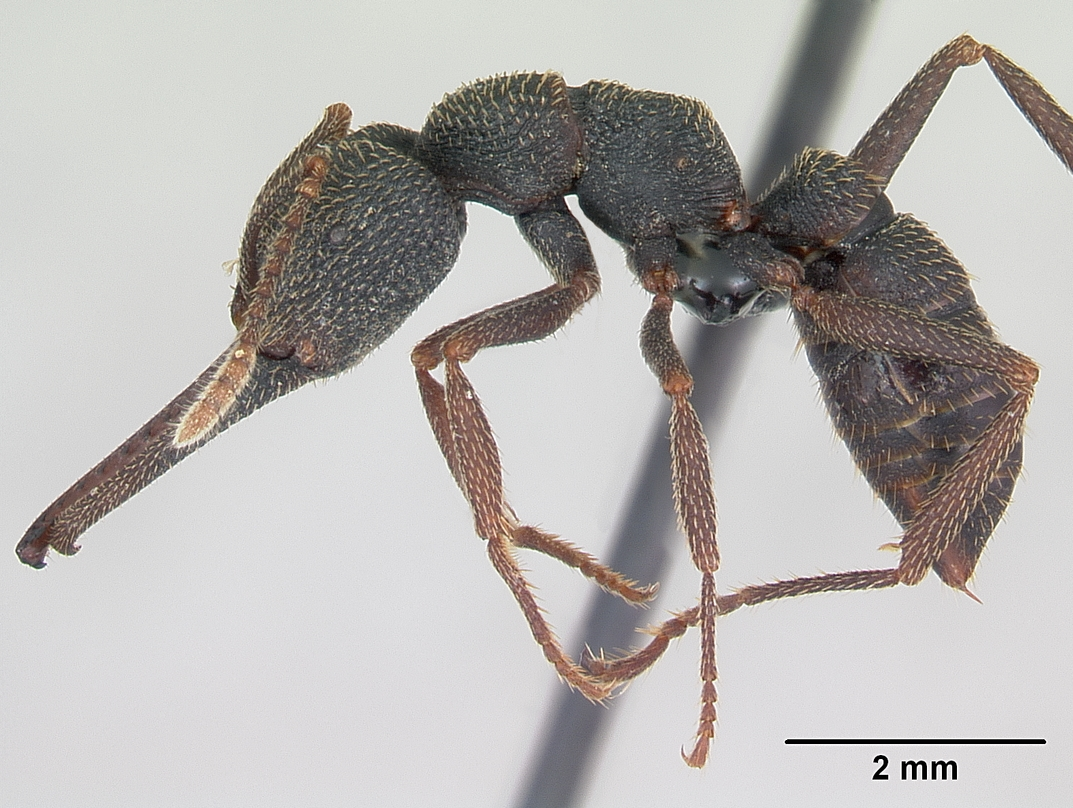
- Mystrium mysticum worker from Madagascar

Scientific classification
- Kingdom: Animalia
- Phylum: Arthropoda
- Class: Insecta
- Order: Hymenoptera
- Family: Formicidae
- Subfamily: Amblyoponinae
- Tribe: Amblyoponini
- Genus: Mystrium; Roger, 1862

Type species
- Mystrium mysticum Roger, 1862

Diversity
- 14 species

= Mystrium =

Genus of ants

Mystrium is a rare genus of ants in the subfamily Amblyoponinae. First described by Roger (1862) with the description of the queen of M. mysticum, the genus contains 14 species, all of which occur in the rainforests of the Old World with over half of the species endemic to the Malagasy region.

== Distribution ==
All species occur in the rainforests of the Old World, with most found in tropical Africa: ten of them are restricted to Madagascar (and its adjacent islands) and one is recorded from continental Africa (M. silvestrii). M. camillae is widespread in the Indo-Australian region, and M. leonie and M. maren are known from Indonesia.

== Taxonomic history ==
After Roger (1862) established Mystrium with a single species from Madagascar, Mystrium mysticum, Forel described five additional species in the Malagasy region between 1895 and 1899. The first record of Mystrium outside the Malagasy region was Mystrium camillae from Myanmar, and the second was Mystrium silvestrii from Cameroon. A subspecies was later established under Mystrium camillae, Mystrium camillae javana; however, this subspecies was synonymized with Mystrium camillae by Brown (1960). Outside the Malagasy region, Mystrium oculatum, was described from China, and Mystrium leonie and Mystrium maren from West Papua, Indonesia. Mystrium oculatum was synonymized with Mystrium camillae by Bihn and Verhaagh (2007). Yoshimura and Fisher (2014) described six new Malagasy species and synonymized two existing names, Mystrium fallax and M. stadelmanni with M. voeltzkowi and M. mysticum, respectively.

== Description ==
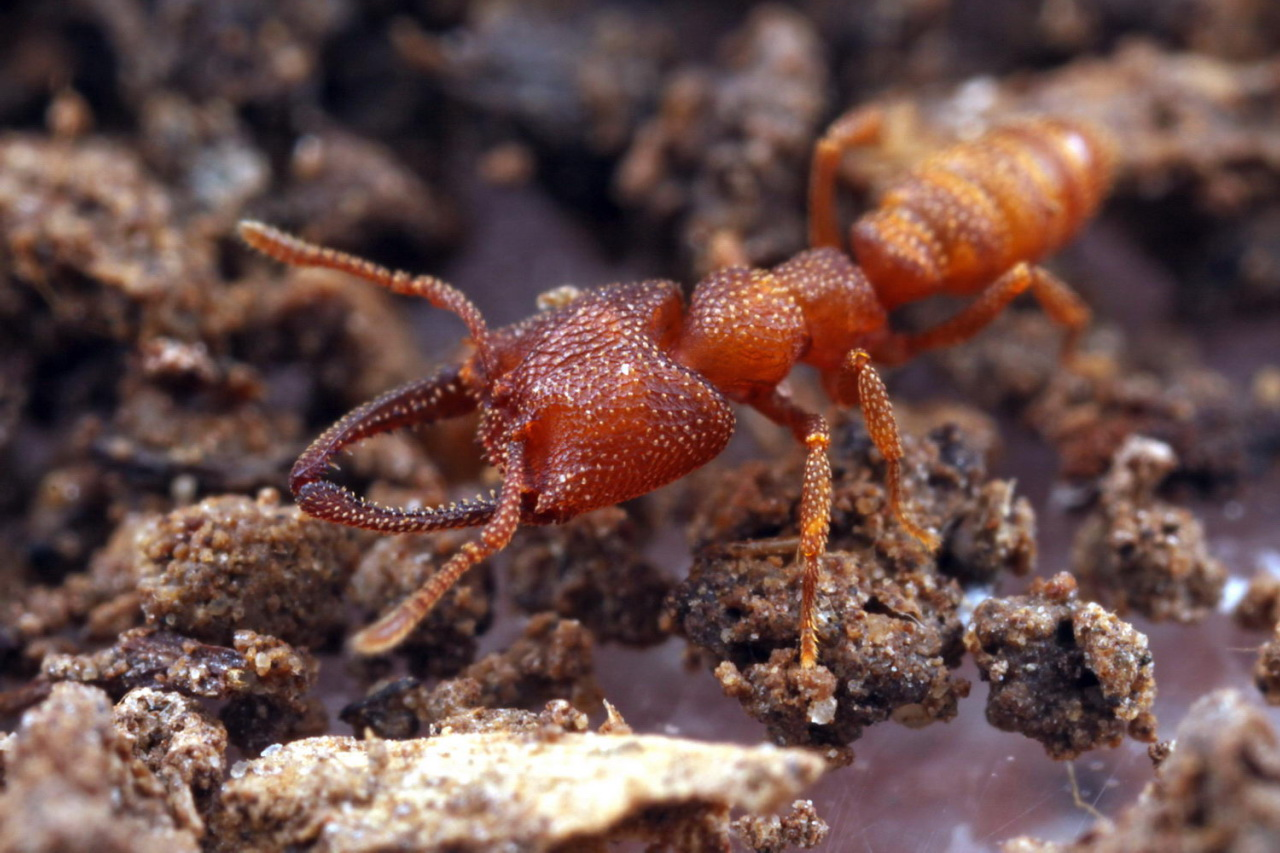
M. camillae worker from Danum Valley, Malaysia

The genus is morphologically very peculiar within the poneromorph subfamily group and has the following combination of characteristics: the very wide head; spatulate or squamate hairs on the head; and long, narrow mandibles with a double row of teeth on the inner margins. Monophyly of the genus is strongly supported by a recent molecular phylogenetic study by Saux et al. (2004).

=== Mandible snap ===
In December 2018, researchers from the University of Illinois, North Carolina State University and the Smithsonian Museum of Natural History conducted studies which found that ants of the species Mystrium camillae (also known as Dracula ants) can snap their jaws at speeds of up to 200 mph, making it the fastest recorded animal movement. Their research, published in the peer-reviewed Royal Society Open Science journal, noted that the jaw structure was different from other strong-jawed ants in that "instead of using three different parts for the spring, latch and lever arm, all three are combined in the mandible." They achieve this speed by pressing the tips of their mandibles together, in a spring-loading action (thereby continuously increasing tension), until one slides over the other in a snapping motion, similar to a human finger snap.

== Biology ==
Besides their bizarre morphology Mystrium ants have also evolved some unique biological traits. They have a unique defense mechanism in which they snap their mandibles to generate a powerful strike (Gronenberg et al. 1998; Moffett 1986). Molet et al. (2006) demonstrated that, in some species of Mystrium known from Madagascar, normal queens are replaced by wingless reproductives which are smaller than workers. Because Mystrium are rarely encountered, information on their general biology, ecology and behavior remains sparse. They are presumably predaceous like other species of the subfamily Amblyoponinae, although no direct evidence is available. Species in Madagascar show two distinct reproductive strategies and relevant colony structures. In some species each colony has a single dealate queen with a larger thorax than workers but with mandibles similar to those of the workers. In colonies of other species winged queens are missing and half of the female adults belong to wingless reproductives which are smaller and allometrically distinct from workers.

== Species ==
- Mystrium barrybressleri Yoshimura & Fisher, 2014
- Mystrium camillae Emery, 1889
- Mystrium eques Yoshimura & Fisher, 2014
- Mystrium janovitzi Yoshimura & Fisher, 2014
- Mystrium labyrinth Yoshimura & Fisher, 2014
- Mystrium leonie Bihn & Verhaagh, 2007
- Mystrium maren Bihn & Verhaagh, 2007
- Mystrium mirror Yoshimura & Fisher, 2014
- Mystrium mysticum Roger, 1862
- Mystrium oberthueri Forel, 1897
- Mystrium rogeri Forel, 1899
- Mystrium shadow Yoshimura & Fisher, 2014
- Mystrium silvestrii Santschi, 1914
- Mystrium voeltzkowi Forel, 1897
