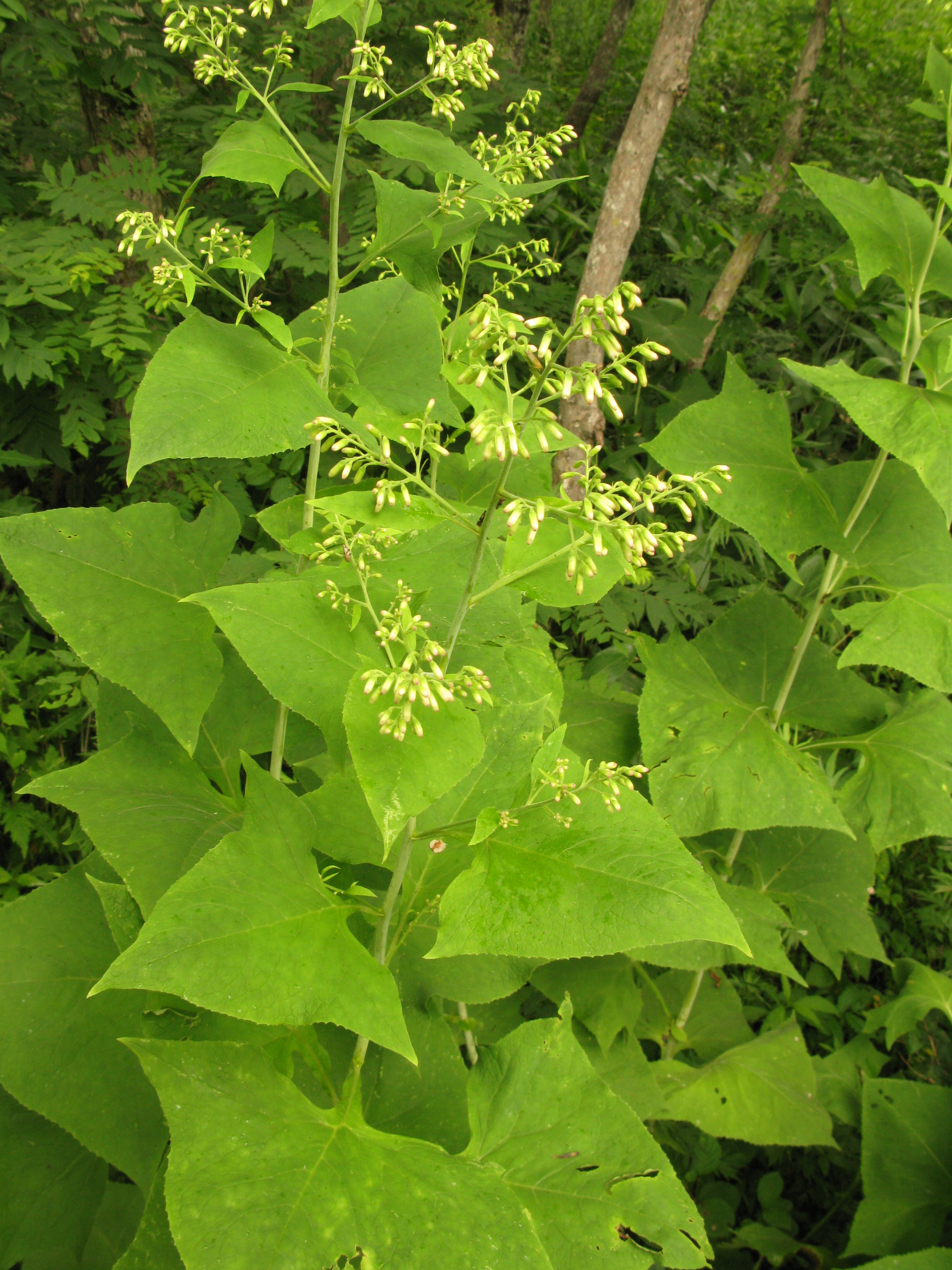
- Parasenecio hastatus subsp. orientalis

Scientific classification
- Kingdom: Plantae
- Clade: Tracheophytes
- Clade: Angiosperms
- Clade: Eudicots
- Clade: Asterids
- Order: Asterales
- Family: Asteraceae
- Genus: Parasenecio
- Species: P. hastatus

Binomial name
- Parasenecio hastatus (L.) H.Koyama

Subspecies
- Parasenecio hastatus subsp. orientalis Parasenecio hastatus subsp. orientalis var. ramosus Parasenecio hastatus subsp. tanakae

Synonyms
- Cacalia hastata Linnaeus, Sp. Pl. 2: 835. 1753; C. hastata subsp. orientalis Kitamura; C. hastata var. pubescens Ledebour; Hasteola hastata (Linnaeus) Pojarkova; Koyamacalia hastata (Linnaeus) H. Robinson & Brettell; Senecio sagittatus Schultz Bipontinus; S. sagittatus var. pubescens (Ledebour) Maximowicz

= Parasenecio hastatus =

Species of flowering plant

Parasenecio hastatus (Chinese: 山尖子, shānjiānzi) is a flowering plant species in the genus Parasenecio found in China and East Asia. It contains toxic pyrrolizidine alkaloids.
