= Barry Bolton =

English myrmecologist

Barry Bolton is an English myrmecologist, an expert on the classification, systematics, and taxonomy of ants, who long worked at the Natural History Museum, London. He is known especially for monographs on African and Asian ants, and for encyclopaedic global works, including the Identification Guide to Ant Genera (1994), A New General Catalogue of Ants of the World (1995, updated in 2007), Synopsis and Classification of Formicidae (2003), and Bolton's Catalogue of Ants of the World: 1758-2005 (2007). Now retired, Bolton is a Fellow of the Royal Entomological Society and Myrmecologist, Biodiversity Division, Department of Entomology, Natural History Museum, London.

== Recognition ==
At least 21 species of ants are named in Bolton's honour:

- Anochetus boltoni
- Anomalomyrma boltoni
- Cataulacus boltoni
- Chimaeridris boltoni
- Cryptomyrmex boltoni
- Daceton boltoni
- Leptanilla boltoni
- Loweriella boltoni
- Meranoplus boltoni
- Monomorium boltoni
- Myrmica boltoni
- Nylanderia boltoni
- Pheidole boltoni
- Plagiolepis boltoni
- Polyrhachis boltoni
- Pristomyrmex boltoni
- Proceratium boltoni
- Stigmatomma boltoni
- Strumigenys boltoni
- Tetramorium boltoni

== Books ==
- Bolton, Barry; Gauld, I. D., eds. (1988). The Hymenoptera. Oxford University Press. ISBN 9780198585213.
- Bolton, Barry (1994). Identification Guide to the Ant Genera of the World. Harvard University Press. ISBN 0674442806.
- Bolton, Barry (1995). A New General Catalogue of the Ants of the World. Harvard University Press. ISBN 067461514X.
- Bolton, Barry (2000). The Ant Tribe Dacetini. Volume 65 of the series Memoirs of the American Entomological Institute. Gainesville, FL: American Entomological Institute. ISBN 9781887988094.
- Bolton, Barry (2003). Synopsis and Classification of Formicidae. Volume 71 of the series Memoirs of the American Entomological Institute. Gainesville, FL: American Entomological Institute. ISBN 9781887988155.
- Bolton, Barry; Alpert, Gary; Ward, Philip S.; Naskrecki, Piotr (2006). Bolton's Catalogue of Ants of the World 1758-2005. Harvard University Press. ISBN 9780674021518.
- Bolton, Barry; Fisher, B. L. (2016). Ants of Africa and Madagascar: A Guide to the Genus. University of California Press. ISBN 9780520290891.
- Bolton's publications. List of publications and pdfs at antbase.org.
