= Meranoplus cryptomys =

Scientific classification
- Domain: Eukaryota
- Kingdom: Animalia
- Phylum: Arthropoda
- Class: Insecta
- Order: Hymenoptera
- Family: Formicidae
- Subfamily: Myrmicinae
- Genus: Meranoplus
- Species: M. cryptomys

Binomial name
- Meranoplus cryptomys Boudinot & Fisher, 2013

Species of ant

Meranoplus cryptomys is a Malagasy species of ant in the genus Meranoplus.

Despite the infrequent collection of this presumably rare species, M. cryptomys has a relatively broad range within the spiny forest/thickets and savanna woodland habitats of Madagascar. Workers of Meranoplus cryptomys are only known from two individuals collected at Tsimanampetsotsa, while gynes have been collected at the Isalo and Andohahela National Parks and the Beza Mahafaly Reserve. Neither hand-collected workers nor nests have been collected; all known individuals are from Malaise or pitfall traps. Although two female castes have not been collected together, they share characteristics unique to the Malagasy Meranoplus and indicate they belong to the same species: comparatively short scapes, widely set clypeal denticles, high oculomandibular indices (OMI), characters of sculpturation, and the striking orange bicoloration. The strong orange and black bicolored coloration of M. cryptomys is notable for its similarity to that of M. mayri. These two species overlap in range across the south and southeast of Madagascar, from Andohahela to Isalo. Males are unknown.
