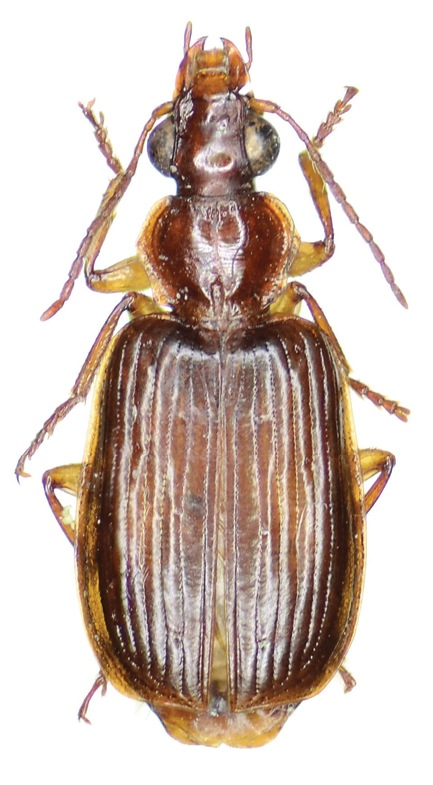
- Anchista nubila

Scientific classification
- Domain: Eukaryota
- Kingdom: Animalia
- Phylum: Arthropoda
- Class: Insecta
- Order: Coleoptera
- Suborder: Adephaga
- Family: Carabidae
- Subfamily: Lebiinae
- Tribe: Lebiini
- Subtribe: Physoderina
- Genus: Anchista; Nietner, 1856
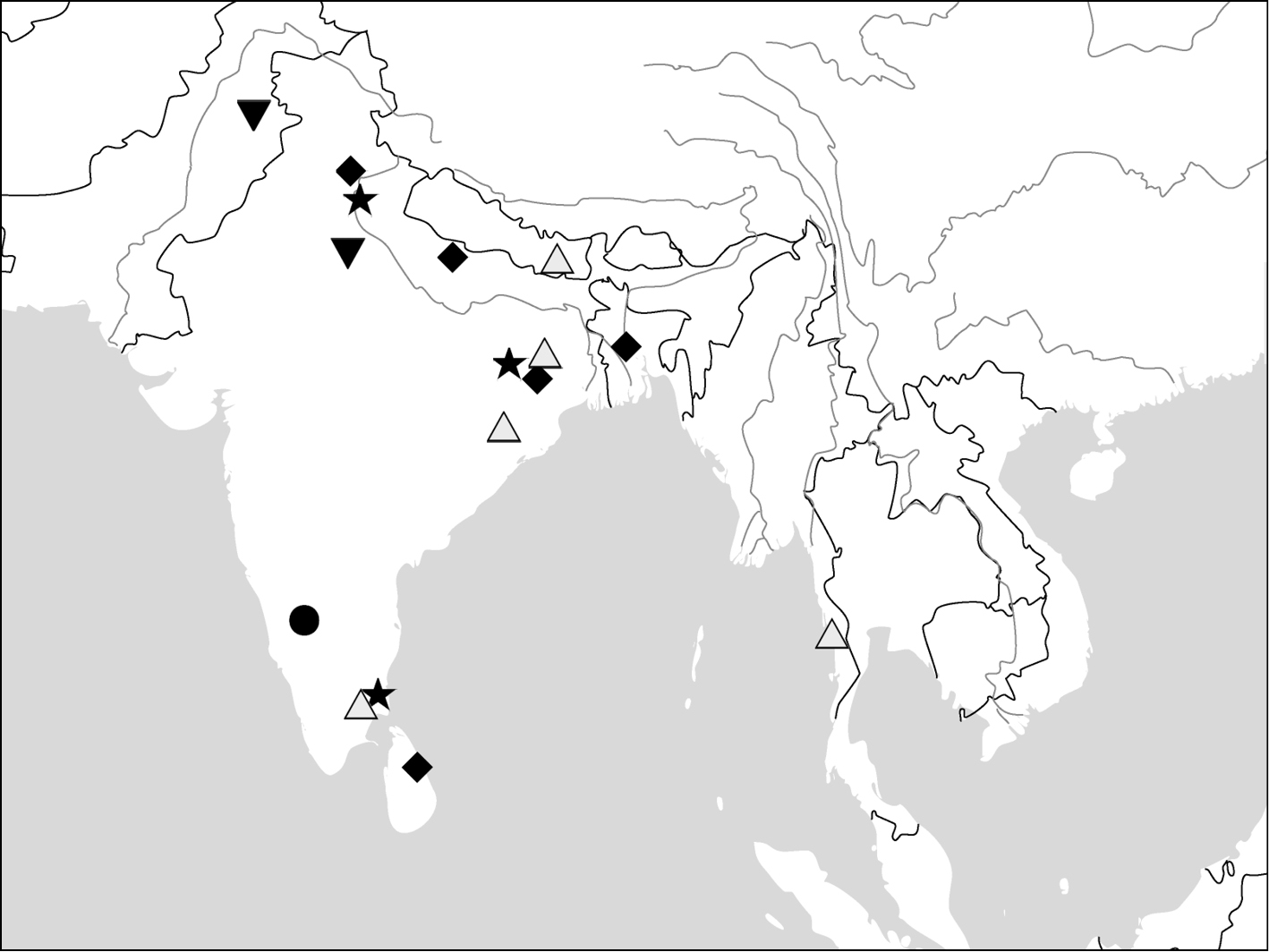
- ◆ Anchista brunnea ★ Anchista nubila ● Anchista pilosa △ Anchista fenestrata fenestrata ▼ Anchista fenestrata subpubescens

= Anchista =

Genus of beetles

Anchista is a genus of beetles in the family Carabidae, containing the following species:

- Anchista brunnea (Wiedemann, 1823)
- Anchista fenestrata (Schmidt-Gobel, 1846)
  - Anchista fenestrata subpubescens Chaudoir, 1877
- Anchista nubila Andrewes, 1931
- Anchista pilosa Shi & Liang, 2013

The following species have become synonyms:

- Anchista binotata (Dejean, 1825): Synonym of Paraphaea binotata (Dejean, 1825)
- Anchista discoidalis (Bates, 1892): Synonym of Orionella discoidalis (Bates, 1892)
- Anchista eurydera Chaudoir, 1877: Synonym of Paraphaea binotata (Dejean, 1825)
- Anchista formosana Jedlicka, 1946: Synonym of Paraphaea formosana (Jedlicka, 1946)
- Anchista glabra Chaudoir, 1877: Synonym of Anchista fenestrata (Schmidt-Gobel, 1846)
- Anchista nepalensis Kirschenhofer, 1994: Synonym of Anchista fenestrata (Schmidt-Gobel, 1846)
- Anchista subpubescens Chaudoir, 1877: Synonym of Anchista fenestrata subpubescens Chaudoir, 1877
