= Daceton boltoni =

Scientific classification
- Domain: Eukaryota
- Kingdom: Animalia
- Phylum: Arthropoda
- Class: Insecta
- Order: Hymenoptera
- Family: Formicidae
- Subfamily: Myrmicinae
- Genus: Daceton
- Species: D. boltoni

Binomial name
- Daceton boltoni Azorsa & Sosa-Calvo, 2008

Species of ant

Daceton boltoni is a Neotropical species of arboreal ants in the subfamily Myrmicinae. The species occurs in Peru and Brazil and is similar to its sister species, D. armigerum.

== Distribution ==
It seems to be exclusively canopy-dwelling and is known to occur in Iquitos, Peru, and Manaus and Cotriguaçu, Brazil. D. boltoni is sympatric with D. armigerum. Although its known distribution is currently only two locations in the Amazonian forest, it is possible and indeed likely that D. boltoni shares a broadly overlapping distribution with D. armigerum.

== Description ==
The worker caste of D. boltoni shares many important character states with that of its sister species D. armigerum, including the heart-shaped head, the large eyes located on a low cuticular prominence, the number of apical mandibular teeth, and general habitus. Daceton boltoni differs from D. armigerum by the absence of a specialized row of thick setae on the inner (masticatory) margin of the mandibles; by mandibles that are slightly shorter and more stout, which could indicate differences in prey preferences between the two species; by a broad gap, when seen in profile, between the bases of the fully closed mandibles and the margins of the head capsule; by shallow depressions adjacent to and ventral to the mandibular insertions; by long and simple lateral pronotal spines; by a weakly impressed metanotal groove; and by subdecumbent to decumbent hairs on the tergite of abdominal segment IV.

Behaviorally, D. boltoni appears to be very similar to D. armigerum. However, drop tests conducted at the type locality indicate that D. boltoni individuals exhibit weak and inconsistent aerial gliding behavior relative to those of D. armigerum.

Gynes and males are unknown.

=== Worker variation ===
Among the specimens studied in the original description, Azorsa & Sosa-Calvo (2008) documented some morphological variation, including:

- All castes with sides of head lacking a broad gap between bases of mandibles and margins of head capsule when mandibles are fully closed, with the exception of the two minor workers studied, in which case there is a narrow gap.
- Erect hairs on the ocular crest are present in all workers examined. However, the number of hairs varies among specimens. We suspect that these hairs are fragile and can be easily lost, which may account for the variation observed between specimens. This seems also to apply to the standing hairs on the median promesonotum and behind the posterior tubercles of the promesonotum.
- Humeral tubercles are strongly reduced, sometimes forming a carina or absent, especially in smaller workers.
- The propodeal spines of all of the Peruvian specimens examined converging at the tips (U-shaped, when seen in fronto-dorsal view), whereas in most of the specimens from Brazil the propodeal spines are diverging, more like the state in D. armigerum.
- Petiolar spines short, almost absent in the smaller castes. The petiolar spines are more developed in the specimens from Brazil.
