= Odontomachini =

Scientific classification
- Kingdom: Animalia
- Phylum: Arthropoda
- Class: Insecta
- Order: Hymenoptera
- Family: Formicidae
- Subfamily: Ponerinae
- Tribe: Odontomachini; Emery, 1911

Tribe of ants

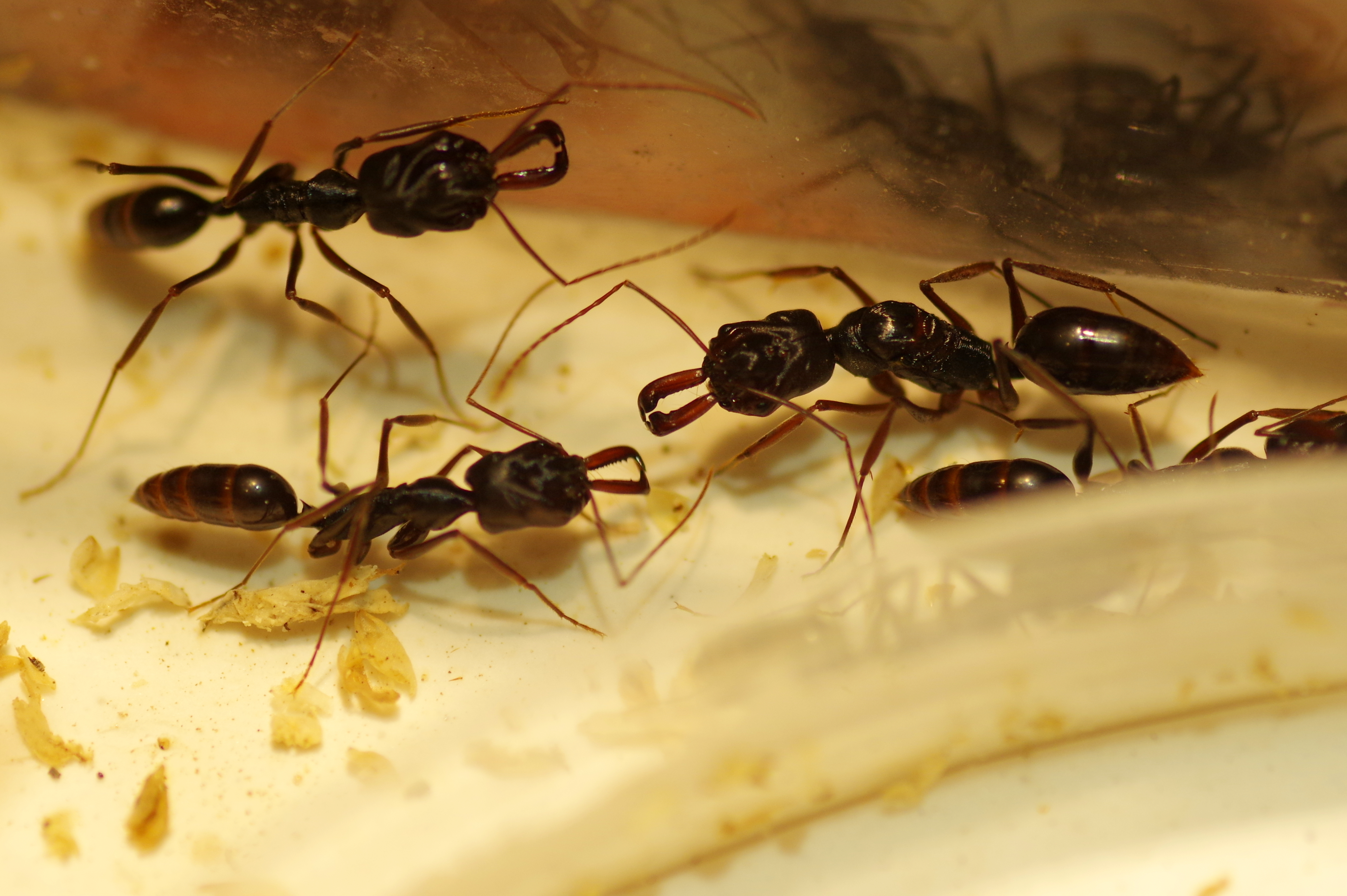
Odontomachus monticola

Ondontomachini is a tribe of ants which belongs to the subfamily Ponerinae. Ondontomachini includes two genera: Odontomachus and Anochetus.
