= Clivina elongatula =

Scientific classification
- Domain: Eukaryota
- Kingdom: Animalia
- Phylum: Arthropoda
- Class: Insecta
- Order: Coleoptera
- Suborder: Adephaga
- Family: Carabidae
- Genus: Clivina
- Species: C. elongatula

Binomial name
- Clivina elongatula Nietner, 1856

Species of beetle

Clivina elongatula is a species of ground beetle in the subfamily Scaritinae. It was described by Nietner in 1856.
