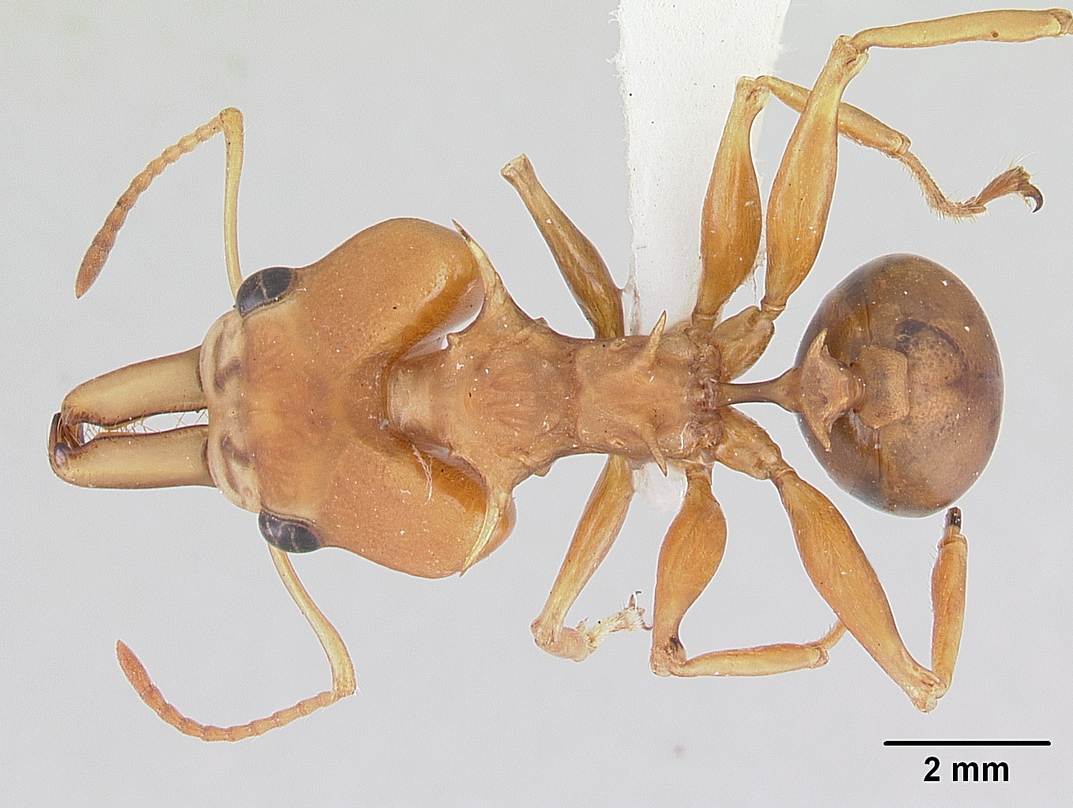
- D. armigerum worker from Brazil

Scientific classification
- Kingdom: Animalia
- Phylum: Arthropoda
- Class: Insecta
- Order: Hymenoptera
- Family: Formicidae
- Subfamily: Myrmicinae
- Tribe: Attini
- Genus: Daceton; Perty, 1833

Type species
- Formica armigera Latreille, 1802

Diversity
- 2 species

Synonyms
- Dacetum Agassiz, 1846

= Daceton =

Genus of ants

Daceton is a Neotropical genus of ants in the subfamily Myrmicinae. The genus contains only two species: D. armigerum, the most studied species, distributed throughout northern South America, and D. boltoni, known from Brazil and Peru.

Trap-jawed ants: Strumigenys, Daceton, Odontomachus, Anochetus, Myrmoteras

== Species ==
- Daceton armigerum (Latreille, 1802)
- Daceton boltoni Azorsa & Sosa-Calvo, 2008
