= Coryza (beetle) =

Scientific classification
- Kingdom: Animalia
- Phylum: Arthropoda
- Clade: Pancrustacea
- Class: Insecta
- Order: Coleoptera
- Suborder: Adephaga
- Family: Carabidae
- Subfamily: Scaritinae
- Tribe: Clivinini
- Subtribe: Schizogeniina
- Genus: Coryza; Putzeys, 1867

Synonyms
- Coriza Fairmaire, 1892

Genus of beetles

Coryza is a genus in the ground beetle family Carabidae. There are about 10 described species in Coryza, found in Africa and Asia.

== Species ==
These 10 species belong to the genus Coryza:

- Coryza alberti Burgeon, 1935 (Sudan, DR Congo, Kenya, Burundi)
- Coryza atriceps Burgeon, 1935 (DR Congo)
- Coryza beccarii Putzeys, 1873 (Southwest Asia, Northeast Africa)
- Coryza carinifrons (Reitter, 1900) (Turkmenistan, Tadzhikistan)
- Coryza gerardi Burgeon, 1935 (DR Congo, Rwanda, Tanzania)
- Coryza globithorax (Fairmaire, 1901) (Africa, Saudi Arabia)
- Coryza maculata (Nietner, 1856) (south Asia)
- Coryza raffrayi Chaudoir, 1876 (Ethiopia)
- Coryza semirubra Andrewes, 1926 (Turkmenistan, Pakistan, Nepal, India)
- Coryza tschitscherini Semenov & Znojko, 1927 (Iran)
