= Anochetus daedalus =

Scientific classification
- Domain: Eukaryota
- Kingdom: Animalia
- Phylum: Arthropoda
- Class: Insecta
- Order: Hymenoptera
- Family: Formicidae
- Genus: Anochetus
- Species: A. daedalus

Binomial name
- Anochetus daedalus Marathe & Priyadarsanan, 2016

Species of ant

Anochetus daedalus is a species of trap-jaw ant in the subfamily Ponerinae. It can be found from Western Ghats in India.

Anochetus daedalus constructs nests in the form of an elaborate maze with horizontal galleries. They have long pincer like mandibles that snap shut on the prey like a bare trap.
