= Anochetus pangens =

Crematogaster pangens

Scientific classification
- Kingdom: Animalia
- Phylum: Arthropoda
- Clade: Pancrustacea
- Class: Insecta
- Order: Hymenoptera
- Family: Formicidae
- Genus: Anochetus
- Species: A. pangens

Binomial name
- Anochetus pangens (Walker, 1859)

Species of ant

Anochetus pangens is a species of ant of the subfamily Ponerinae. It can be found in Sri Lanka.
