= Anochetus consultans =

Crematogaster ransonneti

Scientific classification
- Kingdom: Animalia
- Phylum: Arthropoda
- Clade: Pancrustacea
- Class: Insecta
- Order: Hymenoptera
- Family: Formicidae
- Genus: Anochetus
- Species: A. consultans

Binomial name
- Anochetus consultans (Walker, 1859)

Species of ant

Anochetus consultans is a species of ant in the subfamily Ponerinae. It can be found from Sri Lanka.
