= Anochetus madaraszi =

Crematogaster madaraszi

Scientific classification
- Kingdom: Animalia
- Phylum: Arthropoda
- Clade: Pancrustacea
- Class: Insecta
- Order: Hymenoptera
- Family: Formicidae
- Genus: Anochetus
- Species: A. madaraszi

Binomial name
- Anochetus madaraszi Mayr, 1897

Species of ant

Anochetus madaraszi is a species of ant of the subfamily Ponerinae, which can be found in India, Sri Lanka, and Bangladesh.
