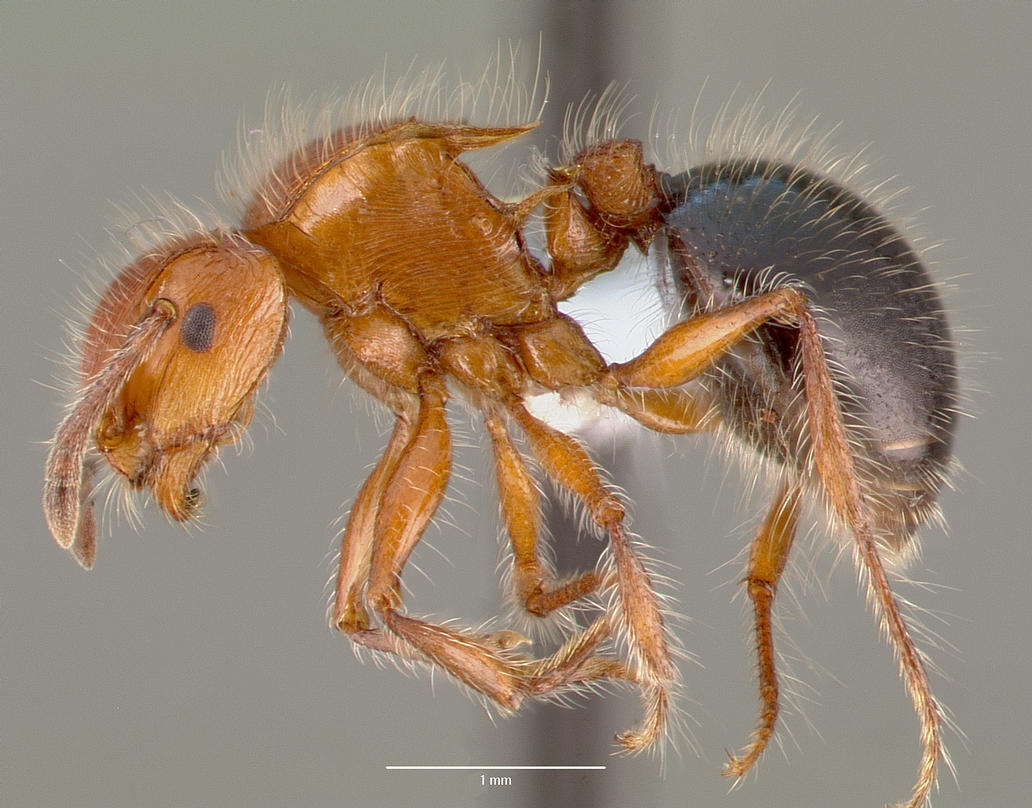
- M. mayri worker from Madagascar

Scientific classification
- Kingdom: Animalia
- Phylum: Arthropoda
- Class: Insecta
- Order: Hymenoptera
- Family: Formicidae
- Subfamily: Myrmicinae
- Tribe: Crematogastrini
- Alliance: Crematogaster genus group
- Genus: Meranoplus; Smith, 1853

Type species
- Cryptocerus bicolor Guérin-Méneville, 1844

Diversity
- 88 species

= Meranoplus =

Genus of ants

Meranoplus is an Old World genus of ants in the subfamily Myrmicinae. With over 80 valid species, it is predicted that over half of the Meranoplus diversity remains undescribed, most of these from Australia.

== Classification ==
Meranoplus is a unique and charismatic myrmicine genus of hairy, slow-moving, and armored ants. The genus was previously classified in its own tribe, the Meranoplini, with one fossil genus, Parameranoplus, from Baltic amber (44.1 ± 1.1 mya), but was moved to Crematogastrini by Ward et al. (2015). The historic shuffling of Meranoplus through higher taxa — Cryptoceridae, Cataulacinae, Tetramoriini, Meranoplini — reflects our poor understanding of the phylogenetic position of Meranoplus within the Formicidae. Brady et al. (2006) recovered a clade of Meranoplus and Cataulacus, although this relationship was not supported in Moreau et al. (2006).

== Distribution ==
The extant species of Meranoplus are distributed throughout the Old World, absent only from the Palearctic and Oceania regions but with the exception of M. levellei, from New Caledonia.

== Biology ==
Species of this genus are predominantly ground-nesting and, when disturbed, will display thanatosis enhanced by crypsis, i.e., individuals will accumulate dirt in their pilosity and play dead. With respect to diet, most species are omnivores and facultative granivores, while others, including the whole M. diversus species group, are specialist granivores. At least one species, the Malaysian rainforest-dwelling M. mucronatus is known to have a trophobiotic relationship with hemipterans. Meranoplus species are known to be active both day and night, and to recruit via pheromone trails laid from the base of the sting using secretions from their extremely large Dufour glands. The function of the spatulate sting is still unknown. The only species of Meranoplus for which mating has been reported is M. peringuiyi, in which mating swarms occurred after a rain and where males patrolled for the outnumbered females in a zig-zag manner.

== Species ==
- Meranoplus affinis Baroni Urbani, 1971
- Meranoplus ajax Forel, 1915
- Meranoplus angustinodis Schödl, 2007
- Meranoplus arcuatus Schödl, 2007
- Meranoplus armatus Smith, 1862
- Meranoplus astericus Donisthorpe, 1947
- Meranoplus aureolus Crawley, 1921
- Meranoplus barretti Santschi, 1928
- Meranoplus beatoni Taylor, 2006
- Meranoplus bellii Forel, 1902
- Meranoplus berrimah Schödl, 2007
- Meranoplus bicolor (Guérin-Méneville, 1844)
- Meranoplus biliran Schödl, 1998
- Meranoplus birmanus Schödl, 1999
- Meranoplus boltoni Schödl, 1998
- Meranoplus borneensis Schödl, 1998
- Meranoplus castaneus Smith, 1857
- Meranoplus christinae Schödl, 2007
- Meranoplus clypeatus Bernard, 1953
- Meranoplus convexius Schödl, 2007
- Meranoplus crassispina Schödl, 2007
- Meranoplus cryptomys Boudinot & Fisher, 2013
- Meranoplus curvispina Forel, 1910
- Meranoplus deserticola Schödl, 2007
- Meranoplus dichrous Forel, 1907
- Meranoplus digitatus Schödl, 2007
- Meranoplus dimidiatus Smith, 1867
- Meranoplus discalis Schödl, 2007
- Meranoplus diversoides Schödl, 2007
- Meranoplus diversus Smith, 1867
- Meranoplus doddi Santschi, 1928
- Meranoplus duyfkeni Forel, 1915
- Meranoplus excavatus Clark, 1938
- Meranoplus fenestratus Smith, 1867
- Meranoplus ferrugineus Crawley, 1922
- Meranoplus froggatti Forel, 1913
- Meranoplus glaber Arnold, 1926
- Meranoplus hilli Crawley, 1922
- Meranoplus hirsutus Mayr, 1876
- Meranoplus hoplites Taylor, 2006
- Meranoplus hospes Forel, 1910
- Meranoplus inermis Emery, 1895
- Meranoplus laeviventris Emery, 1889
- Meranoplus leveillei Emery, 1883
- Meranoplus levis Donisthorpe, 1942
- Meranoplus linae Santschi, 1928
- Meranoplus loebli Schödl, 1998
- Meranoplus magrettii André, 1884
- Meranoplus malaysianus Schödl, 1998
- Meranoplus mars Forel, 1902
- Meranoplus mayri Forel, 1910
- Meranoplus mcarthuri Schödl, 2007
- Meranoplus minimus Crawley, 1922
- Meranoplus minor Forel, 1902
- Meranoplus mjobergi Forel, 1915
- Meranoplus montanus Schödl, 1998
- Meranoplus mucronatus Smith, 1857
- Meranoplus naitsabes Schödl, 2007
- Meranoplus nanus André, 1892
- Meranoplus nepalensis Schödl, 1998
- Meranoplus niger Donisthorpe, 1949
- Meranoplus occidentalis Schödl, 2007
- Meranoplus oceanicus Smith, 1862
- Meranoplus orientalis Schödl, 2007
- Meranoplus oxleyi Forel, 1915
- Meranoplus parviumgulatus (Donisthorpe, 1947)
- Meranoplus peringueyi Emery, 1886
- Meranoplus pubescens (Smith, 1853)
- Meranoplus puryi Forel, 1902
- Meranoplus radamae Forel, 1891
- Meranoplus raripilis Donisthorpe, 1938
- Meranoplus rothneyi Forel, 1902
- Meranoplus rugosus Crawley, 1922
- Meranoplus sabronensis Donisthorpe, 1941
- Meranoplus schoedli Taylor, 2006
- Meranoplus similis Viehmeyer, 1922
- Meranoplus snellingi Schödl, 2007
- Meranoplus spininodis Arnold, 1917
- Meranoplus spinosus Smith, 1859
- Meranoplus sthenus Bolton, 1981
- Meranoplus sylvarius Boudinot & Fisher, 2013
- Meranoplus taurus Schödl, 2007
- Meranoplus testudineus McAreavey, 1956
- Meranoplus tricuspidatus Schödl, 2007
- Meranoplus unicolor Forel, 1902
- Meranoplus variabilis Schödl, 2007
- Meranoplus vestigator Smith, 1876
- Meranoplus wilsoni Schödl, 2007
