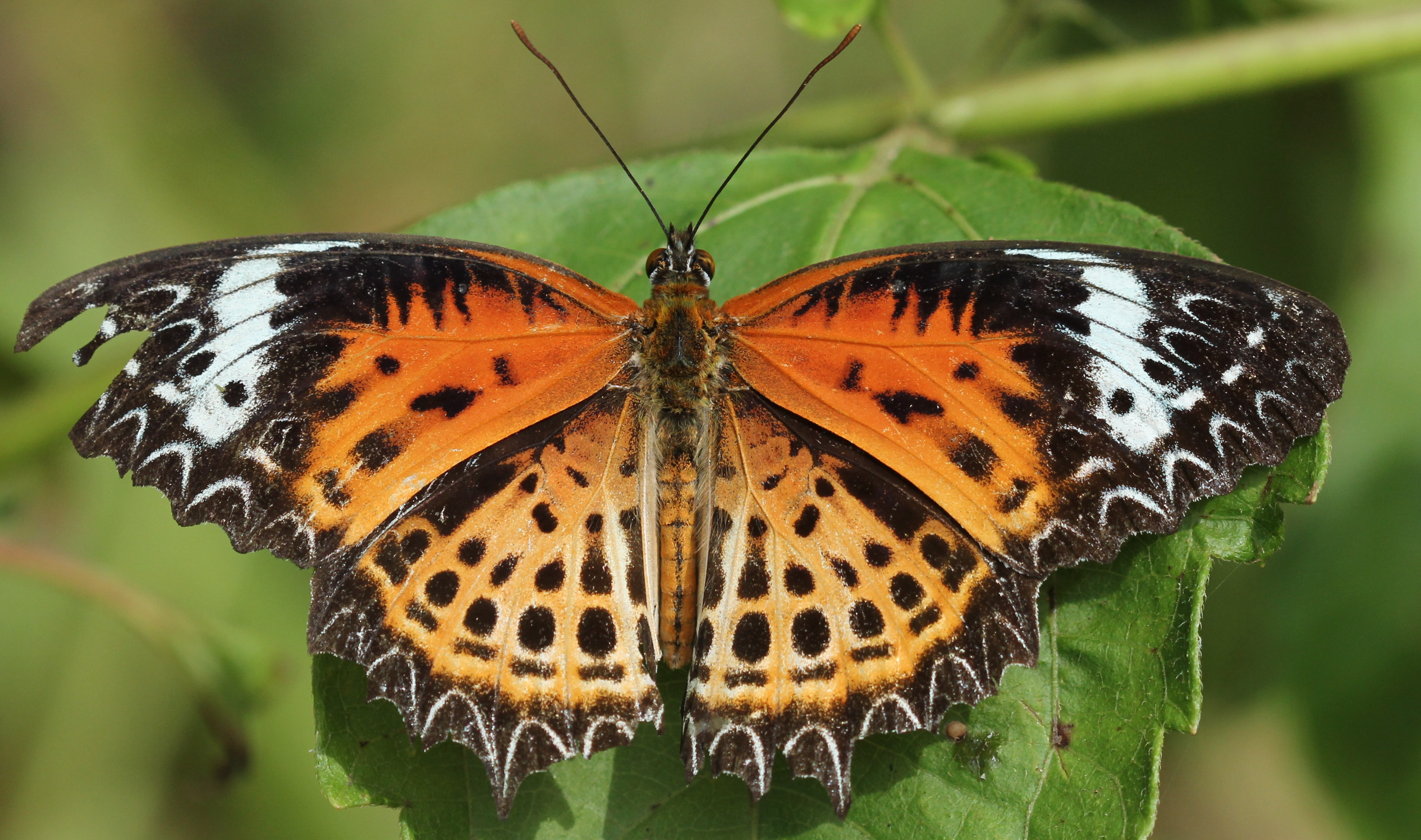

Scientific classification
- Domain: Eukaryota
- Kingdom: Animalia
- Phylum: Arthropoda
- Class: Insecta
- Order: Lepidoptera
- Family: Nymphalidae
- Genus: Cethosia
- Species: C. nietneri

Binomial name
- Cethosia nietneri C. & R. Felder, [1867]

Subspecies
- C. n. nietneri; C. n. mahratta

= Cethosia nietneri =

Tamil lacewing

Species of butterfly

Cethosia nietneri, the Tamil lacewing, is a species of nymphalid butterfly found in Sri Lanka and south India. The species name is after John Nietner who obtained specimens of the butterfly from Ceylon from which it was described.

== Description ==
=== Nominate race (Sri Lanka) ===
==== Male ====
Upperside deep black. Forewing: a broad line along both sides of the basal halves of veins 1 and 2 and of median vein ochraceous; a curved series of short bluish streaks between the veins beyond apex of cell, terminating in a much longer streak above vein 4; a transverse discal series of similarly coloured slender oval loops, open outwardly, followed by a series of transverse white spots, the upper two bluish, and a subterminal row of slender lunules, the tornal lunule double. Hindwing: interspace 1a and interspace 1 to near the tornus pinkish or bluish white, the markings of the underside showing through; cell black, with an ochraceous black-centred spot; interspaces 1 to 5 bluish white on disc, with very broad median. Short streaks, followed by a series of large oval spots of the black ground colour; terminal and costal margins very broadly black, traversed by a postdiscal row of transverse short, white, inwardly-turned lunules, and a subterminal row of much more slender, outwardly-turned, similarly coloured lunules. Cilia white. Underside: basal and discal areas of both forewings and hindwings bluish green, variously barred and spotted with black, the short white streaks between the veins beyond apex of cell as on the upperside; a postdiscal band of: pinkish white, somewhat obscure on the fore, more clearly defined on the hindwing, traversed by a series of oval black spots, followed by a broad subterminal even band of ochraceous yellow, inwardly margined by a row of black dots; terminal margins broadly black, traversed by a series of slender outwardly turned white lunules, each lunule with a short white median streak from the margin.

Antennae black; head and thorax black above, greenish white spotted with black beneath; abdomen ochraceous, barred with black, beneath whitish with numerous black dots.

==== Female ====
Similar, all the black markings smaller; the base posteriorly of the forewing on the upperside greenish blue, no trace of ochraceous.

Wingspan 82–110 mm.

=== Larva ===
"Cylindrical, purplish black with red transverse bands, the sixth and eighth segments with a yellow band. Head armed with two long branched spines, the segments with two dorsal and two lateral rows of long, slender, finely-branched spines. Feeds on Modecca." (Moore)

=== Pupa ===
"Brown mottled with ochreous-white, abdominal segments tubercular; wing-case dilated and exfoliated beneath. Head-piece with two pointed processes." (Moore)

=== Race mahratta (South India) ===
==== Male ====
Upperside tawny yellow. Forewing: cell anteriorly along its length and the outer half of the wing, following an irregular line from apex of cell to tornus, black, the black in cell formed of coalescent transverse bars; a broad discal oblique fascia traversed by the black veins, followed by a postdiscal series of black-centred, outward turned, slender white lunules, a transverse series of white spots, and another, subterminal series of similar white lunules; interspaces 1 and 2 with three or four black spots. Hindwing with broad black costal and terminal margins and black markings somewhat similar to those on the hindwing of nietneri, but the markings in the interspaces narrower, the row of large spots margined with white, the inner series of lunules beyond the spots black, followed by a subterminal tawny-yellow band and a row of white, outward-turned, slender lunules as in nietneri. Underside variegated with ochraceous red, bluish white, yellow and black; the terminal margins of both forewings and hindwings broadly black with white lunules, as on the upperside, and median short white lines from the margin in each lunule; cilia alternately black and white. Forewing: basal area ochraceous red, cell with transverse short bands of black and bluish white, below the cell the ochraceous red at base, followed by whitish and then yellow, the disc spotted with black; the oblique white band as on the upperside, succeeded by a transverse postdiscal series of large black spots, ringed narrowly with white, with a row of paired black dots beyond, and a subterminal broad yellow band, its inner margin sinuous. Hindwing: basal area bluish, crossed by broken transverse broad black lines, and followed by a red, a bluish-white, a yellow, a purer white, and lastly a subterminal yellow band with rows of black spots between; on the white band a median series of large black spots. Antennae black, head and thorax brownish black, abdomen ochraceous; the thorax beneath ochraceous, banded with black.

Life cycle

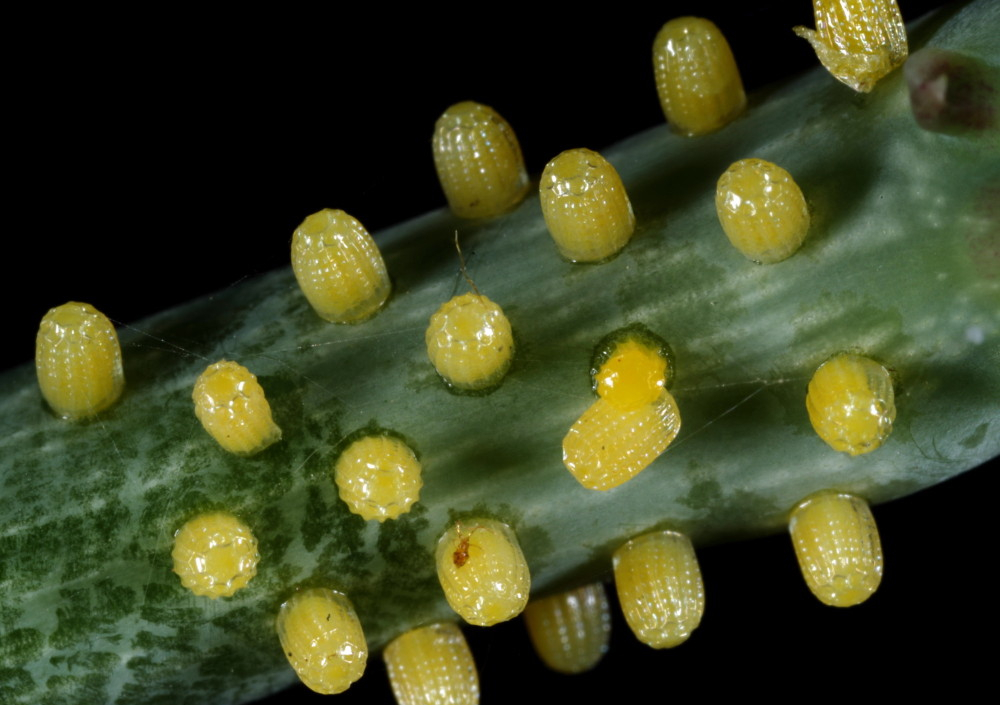
Eggs

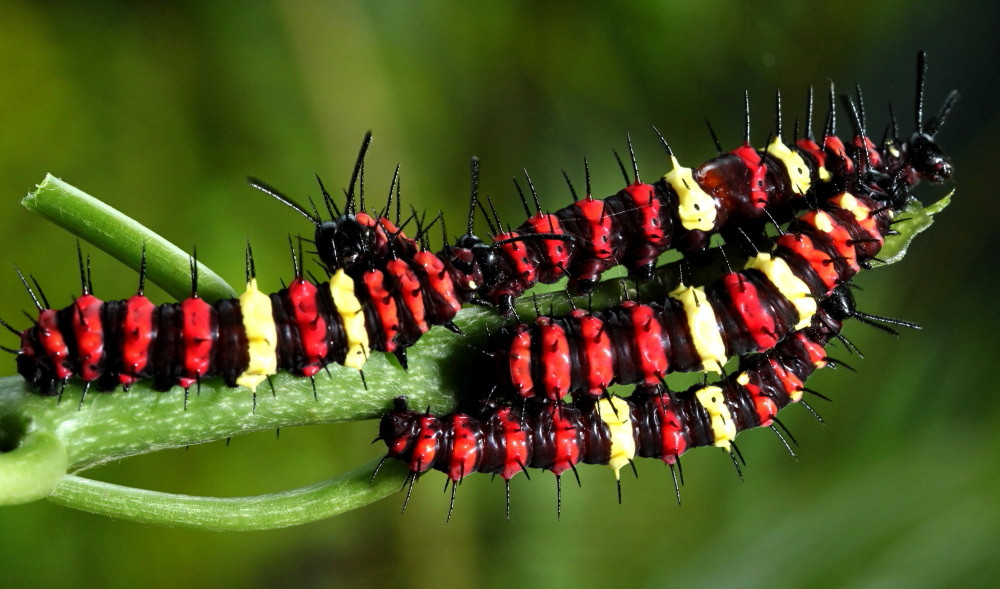
Larva

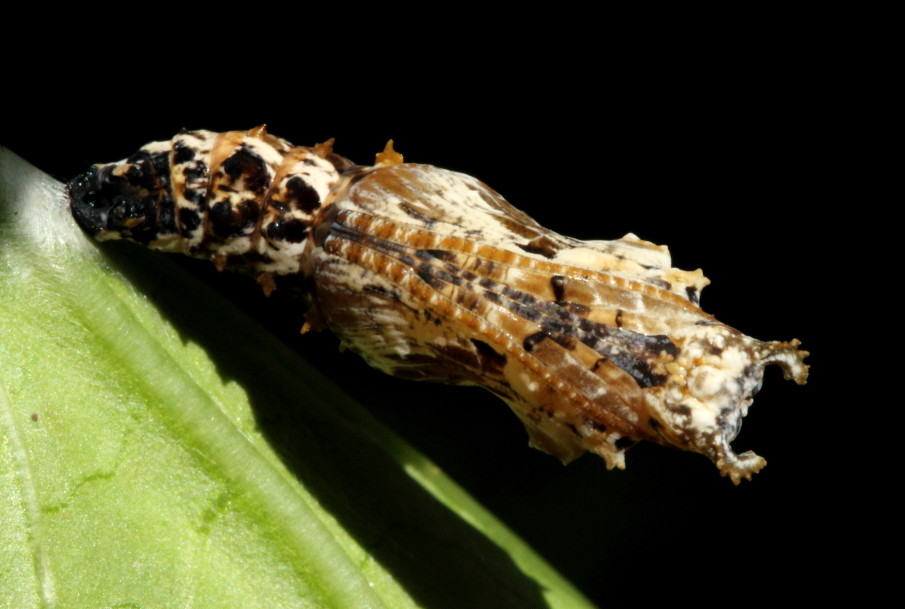
Chrysalis

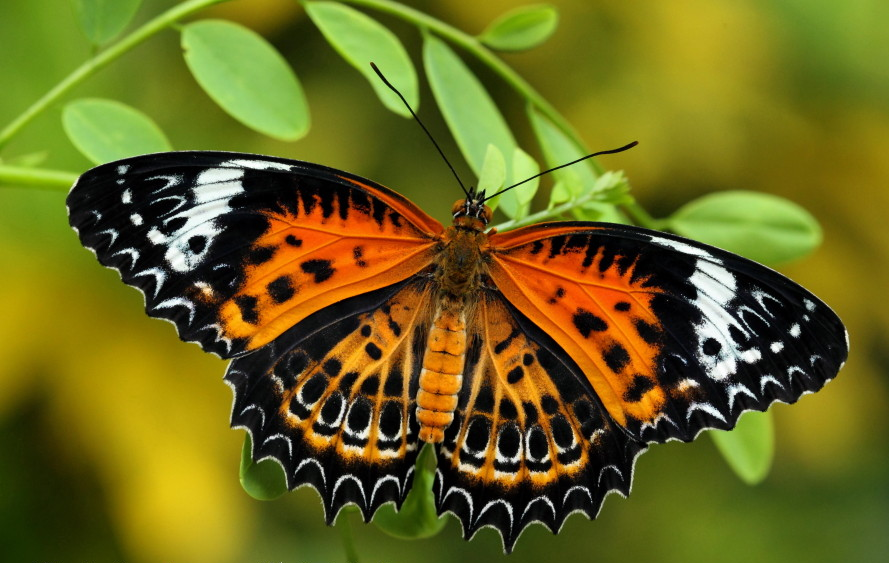
Imago (dorsal view)

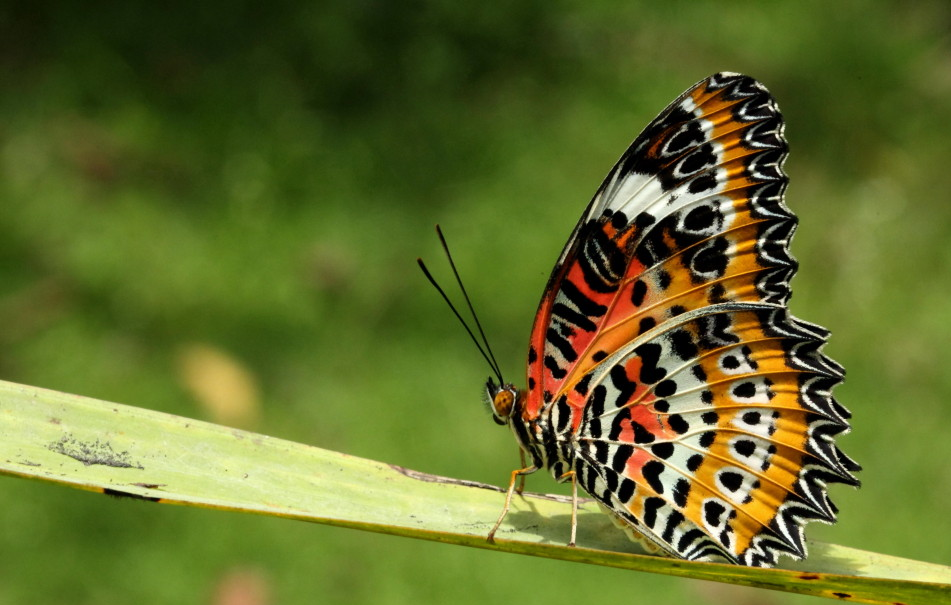
Imago (ventral view)

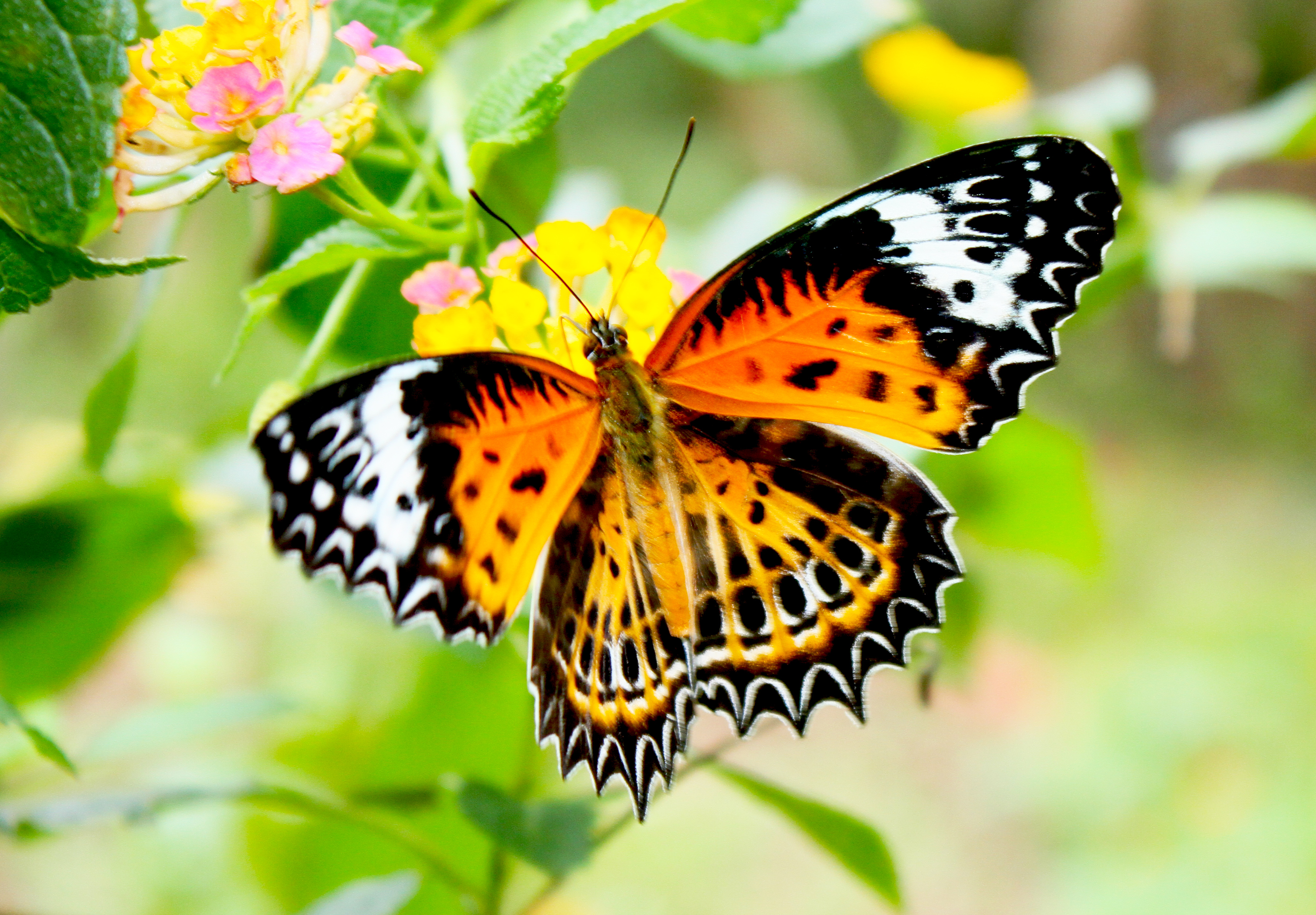
Tamil lacewing photo by E Kunhikrishnan

==== Female ====
Similar, but the tawny yellow on the upperside paler, the markings larger and somewhat diffuse.

=== Larva ===
Cylindrical, but much constricted between each pair of segments, and tapering somewhat towards the head. Six longitudinal rows of fine-pointed spines; on the head only one pair of longer blunt spines. Colour dark brown, with bright red bands encircling all the segments except the 1st, 2nd, 6th, and 8th; on the 6th and 8th the red is replaced by broader bands of lemon yellow.

=== Pupa ===
"Hanging vertically, slender, with two large foliaceous processes springing from the middle of the back, and many less prominent processes on the head, thorax and abdomen; colour purplish brown, much mottled with lighter and darker shades; six dorsal spots of bright gold ... found on the wild passion-flower (Modecca palmata). The caterpillar is gregarious through life." (Davidson and Aitken)
