= Meranoplus parviumgulatus =

Scientific classification
- Domain: Eukaryota
- Kingdom: Animalia
- Phylum: Arthropoda
- Class: Insecta
- Order: Hymenoptera
- Family: Formicidae
- Subfamily: Myrmicinae
- Genus: Meranoplus
- Species: M. parviumgulatus

Binomial name
- Meranoplus parviumgulatus (Donisthorpe, 1947)

Species of ant

Meranoplus parviumgulatus is a species of ant in the genus Meranoplus. It is known from New Guinea and Papua New Guinea.

== Taxonomy ==
The species was first described by Donisthorpe (1947) as Tricytarus parviumgulatus, based on three males from New Guinea, Indonesia. He placed the new species as the type species of the monotypic genus Tricytarus, subfamily Myrmicinae. The type specimens were apparently lost at some point, which made further placement within the tribe uncertain; the genus was treated as incertae sedis (of uncertain placement) in Myrmicinae, incertae sedis in Formicidae, and finally tentatively placed in tribe Formicoxenini (Myrmicinae). Based on new specimens from Papua New Guinea, Boudinot (2014) synonymized Tricytarus under Meranoplus, tribe Meranoplini.
