= Anochetus longifossatus =

Crematogaster longifossatus

Scientific classification
- Kingdom: Animalia
- Phylum: Arthropoda
- Clade: Pancrustacea
- Class: Insecta
- Order: Hymenoptera
- Family: Formicidae
- Genus: Anochetus
- Species: A. longifossatus

Binomial name
- Anochetus longifossatus Mayr, 1897

Synonyms
- Anochetus longifossatus butteli Forel, 1913

Species of ant

Anochetus longifossatus, is a species of ant of the subfamily Ponerinae, which can be found from Sri Lanka.
