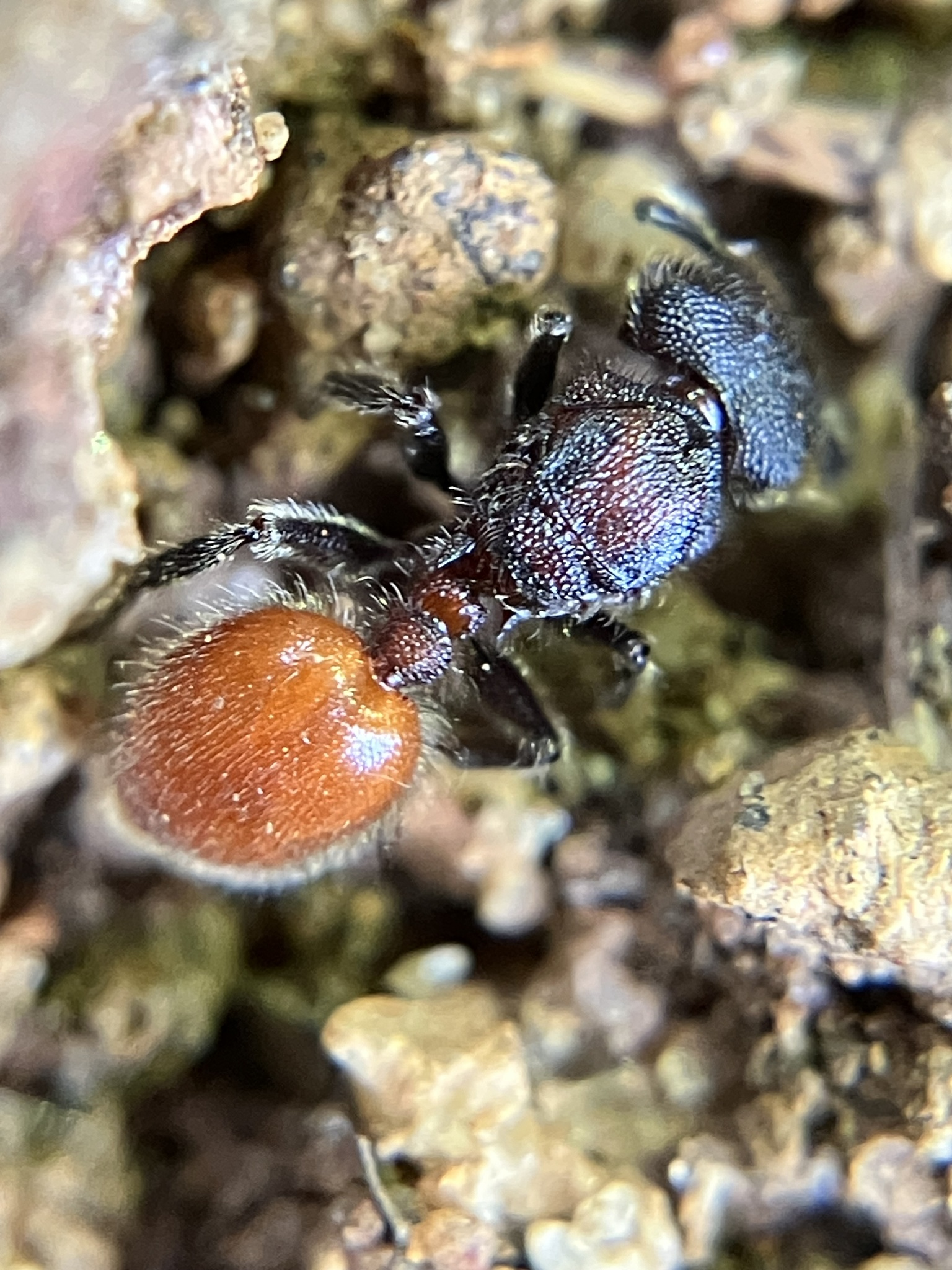
- typical worker

Scientific classification
- Kingdom: Animalia
- Phylum: Arthropoda
- Class: Insecta
- Order: Hymenoptera
- Family: Formicidae
- Subfamily: Myrmicinae
- Genus: Meranoplus
- Species: M. bellii

Binomial name
- Meranoplus bellii Forel, 1902

Synonyms
- M. carinatus Donisthorpe, 1942; M. flaviventris Donisthorpe, 1943

= Meranoplus bellii =

Species of ant

Meranoplus bellii is a species of ant found in the Western Ghats of India. It has a distinct red gaster that appears very circular from above. The rest of the body is brown and covered in short hairs. Workers have a uniquely shaped pronotal shield with an outline that is only close to that of M. castaneus which is not found in the Western Ghats but only in Thailand and further east in Southeast Asia.

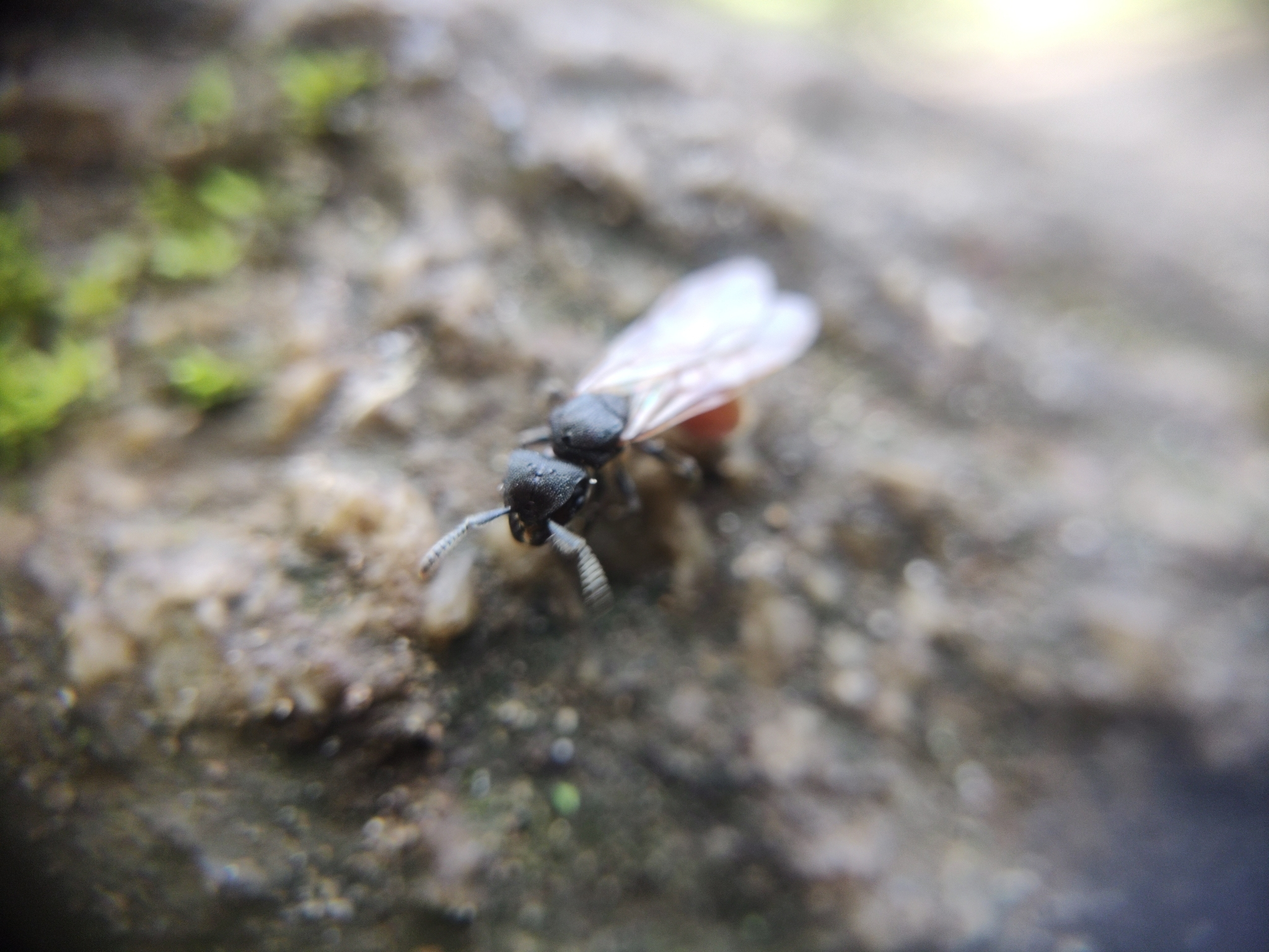
Queen

The species is separated from all others in the genus Meranoplus by the shape of the pronotal shield. The petiolar crest has two tooth-like outgrowths and the post-petiole has a backward facing short spine. There are five teeth on the mandible. The hair on the gaster sometimes darker (which was described as flaviventris). In profile the promesonotal shield does not hang over the propodeum. Another species, Meranoplus periyarensis, described from Periyar has a distinct shape of the promesonotal shield.

The species name is after the collector T.R.D. Bell.
