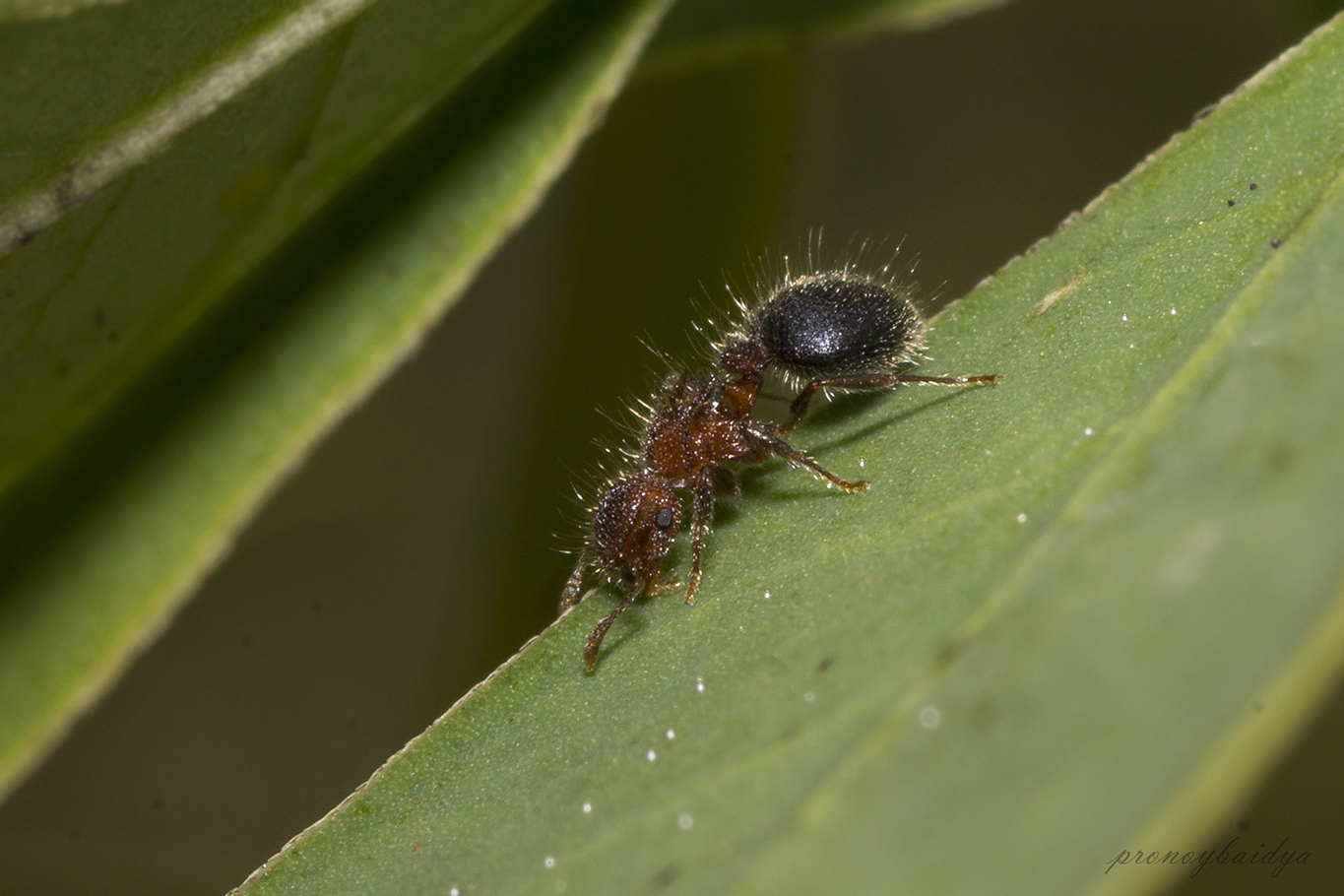

Scientific classification
- Kingdom: Animalia
- Phylum: Arthropoda
- Clade: Pancrustacea
- Class: Insecta
- Order: Hymenoptera
- Family: Formicidae
- Subfamily: Myrmicinae
- Genus: Meranoplus
- Species: M. bicolor

Binomial name
- Meranoplus bicolor (Guérin-Méneville, 1844)

Synonyms
- Meranoplus bicolor bicolor Wheeler, W.M., 1930; Meranoplus bicolor fuscescens Forel, 1903; Meranoplus dimicans Walker, 1859; Meranoplus villosus Motschoulsky, 1860; Myrmica tarda Jerdon, 1851

= Meranoplus bicolor =

Species of ant

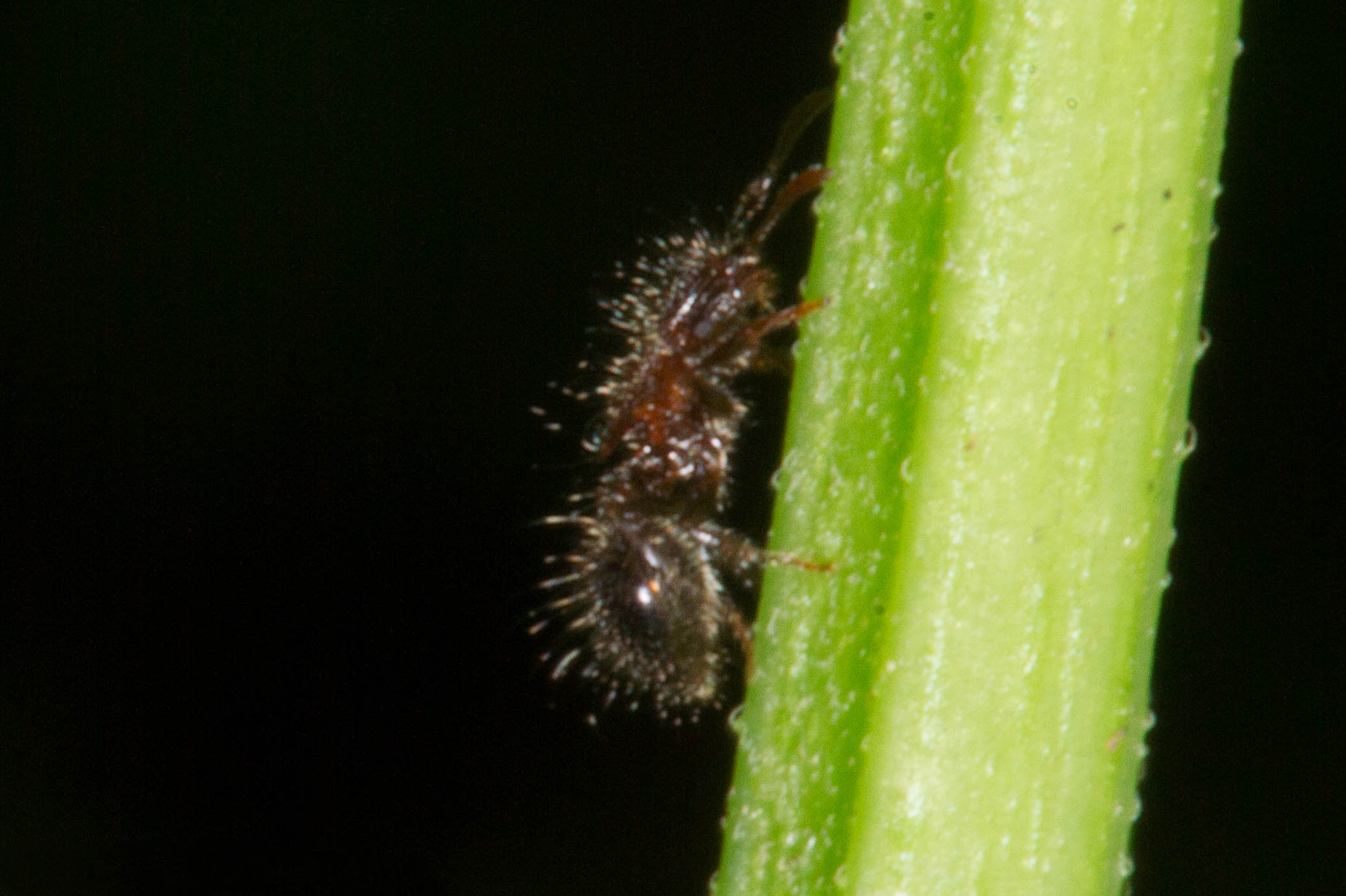

Meranoplus bicolor, is a species of ant of the subfamily Myrmicinae. It is found in many Asian countries, where its habitats range from open grasslands to open-canopy forests. They nest in soil, usually at the base of plants. The nest opening is a simple hole, but it can sometimes have multiple openings. Workers forage on the ground as well as on plants, where they exploit extrafloral nectaries and tend to aphids.

== Distribution ==
Meranoplus bicolor is native to Pakistan, India, Nepal, Bangladesh, Bhutan, Tibet, southern China, Taiwan, Myanmar, Thailand, Laos, Vietnam, Malaysia, Sumatra, Java, Sri Lanka, and the Philippines. It has also been found in Borneo, Singapore, New Zealand, and Louisiana.

In 2021, Filipino–Canadian YouTuber and antkeeper Mikey Bustos, known on that side of the internet as AntsCanada, was credited for discovering the presence of the species in the Philippines, after his findings were verified by Dr. David General, an ant taxonomist and myrmecologist from the University of the Philippines. It is the 555th ant species discovered in the country.

== Subspecies ==
- Meranoplus bicolor bicolor (Guérin-Méneville, 1844)
- Meranoplus bicolor fuscescens Wheeler, 1930
- Meranoplus bicolor lucidus Forel, 1903
