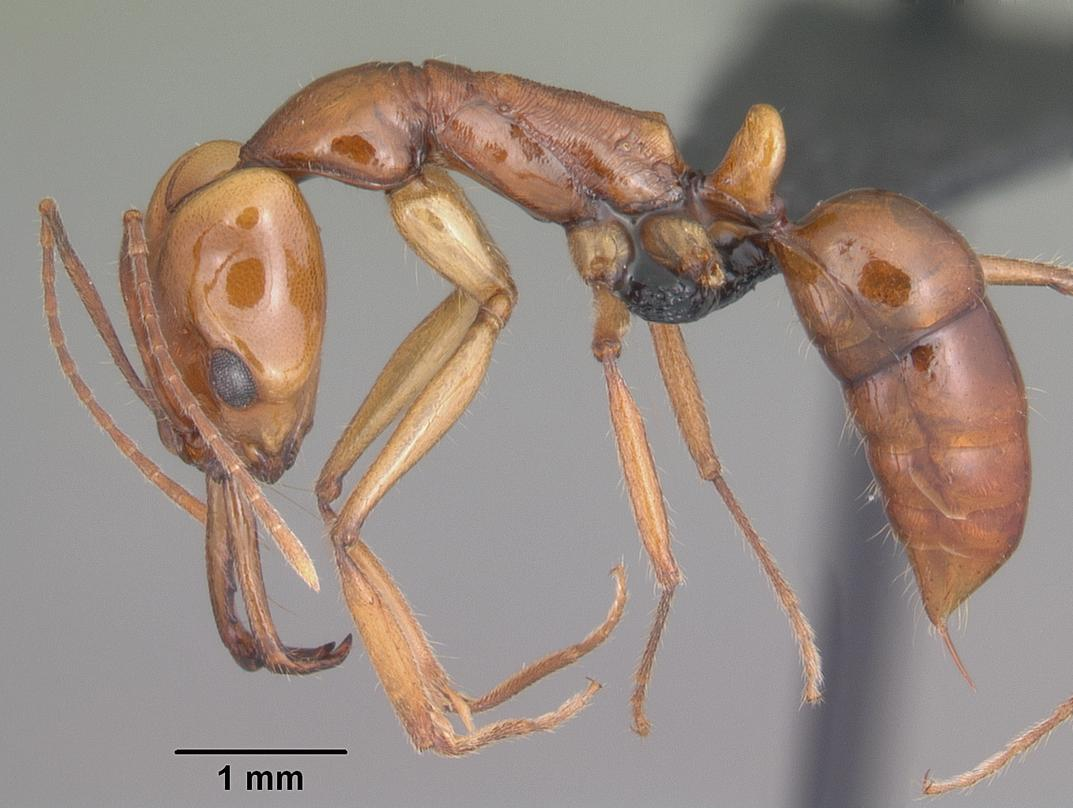

Scientific classification
- Domain: Eukaryota
- Kingdom: Animalia
- Phylum: Arthropoda
- Class: Insecta
- Order: Hymenoptera
- Family: Formicidae
- Genus: Anochetus
- Species: A. goodmani

Binomial name
- Anochetus goodmani B. L. Fisher & M. A. Smith, 2008

= Anochetus goodmani =

Species of ant

Anochetus goodmani is a species of ant in the subfamily Ponerinae.
