= Anochetus yerburyi =

Scientific classification
- Kingdom: Animalia
- Phylum: Arthropoda
- Clade: Pancrustacea
- Class: Insecta
- Order: Hymenoptera
- Family: Formicidae
- Genus: Anochetus
- Species: A. yerburyi

Binomial name
- Anochetus yerburyi Forel, 1900

Species of ant

Anochetus yerburyi is a species of ant of the subfamily Ponerinae. It can be found in India and Sri Lanka.
