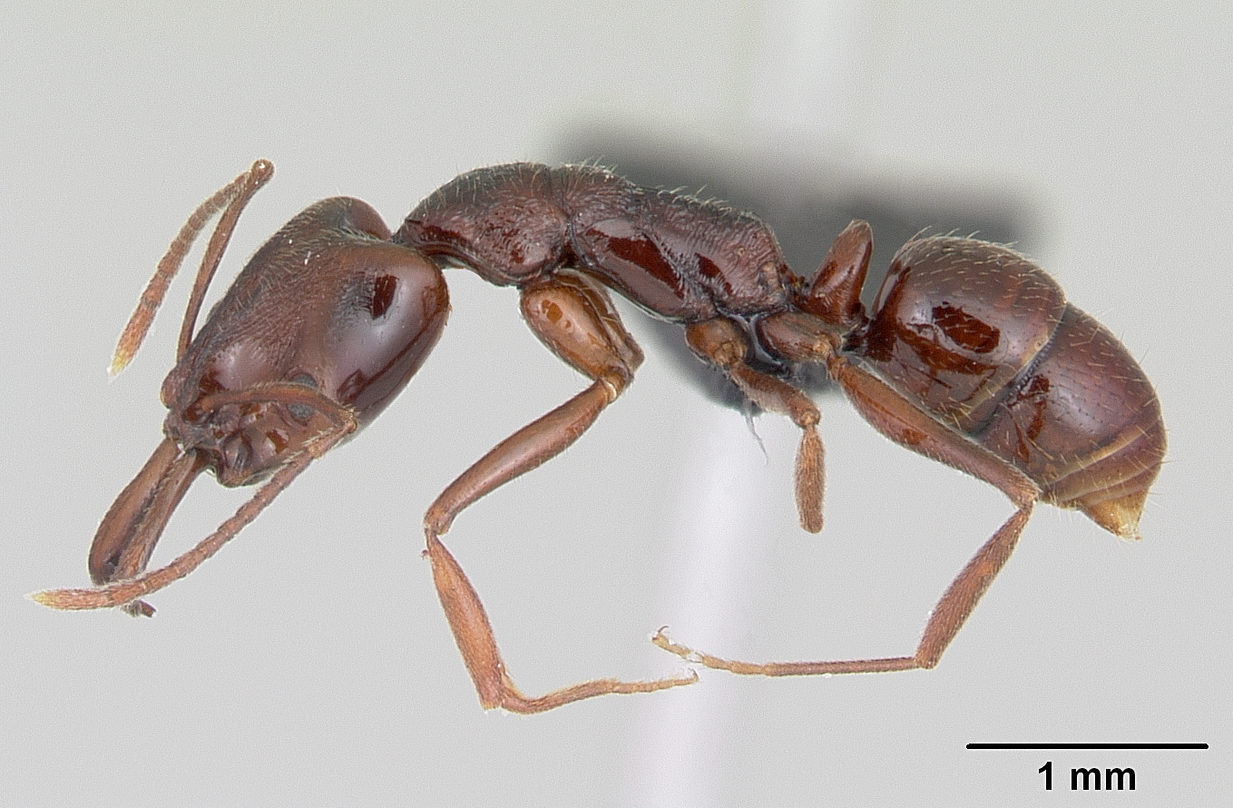

Scientific classification
- Domain: Eukaryota
- Kingdom: Animalia
- Phylum: Arthropoda
- Class: Insecta
- Order: Hymenoptera
- Family: Formicidae
- Genus: Anochetus
- Species: A. pattersoni

Binomial name
- Anochetus pattersoni B. L. Fisher & M. A. Smith, 2008

= Anochetus pattersoni =

Species of ant

Anochetus pattersoni is a species of ant in the subfamily Ponerinae. It was discovered on 19 December 2005 by S.M. Goodman in the Seychelles and described by Fisher, B. L. & Smith, M. A. in 2008.
