= Anochetus paripungens =

Scientific classification
- Kingdom: Animalia
- Phylum: Arthropoda
- Class: Insecta
- Order: Hymenoptera
- Family: Formicidae
- Genus: Anochetus
- Species: A. paripungens

Binomial name
- Anochetus paripungens Brown, 1978

Species of ant

Anochetus paripungens is a species of ant of the subfamily Ponerinae. It can be found in northern Australia.
