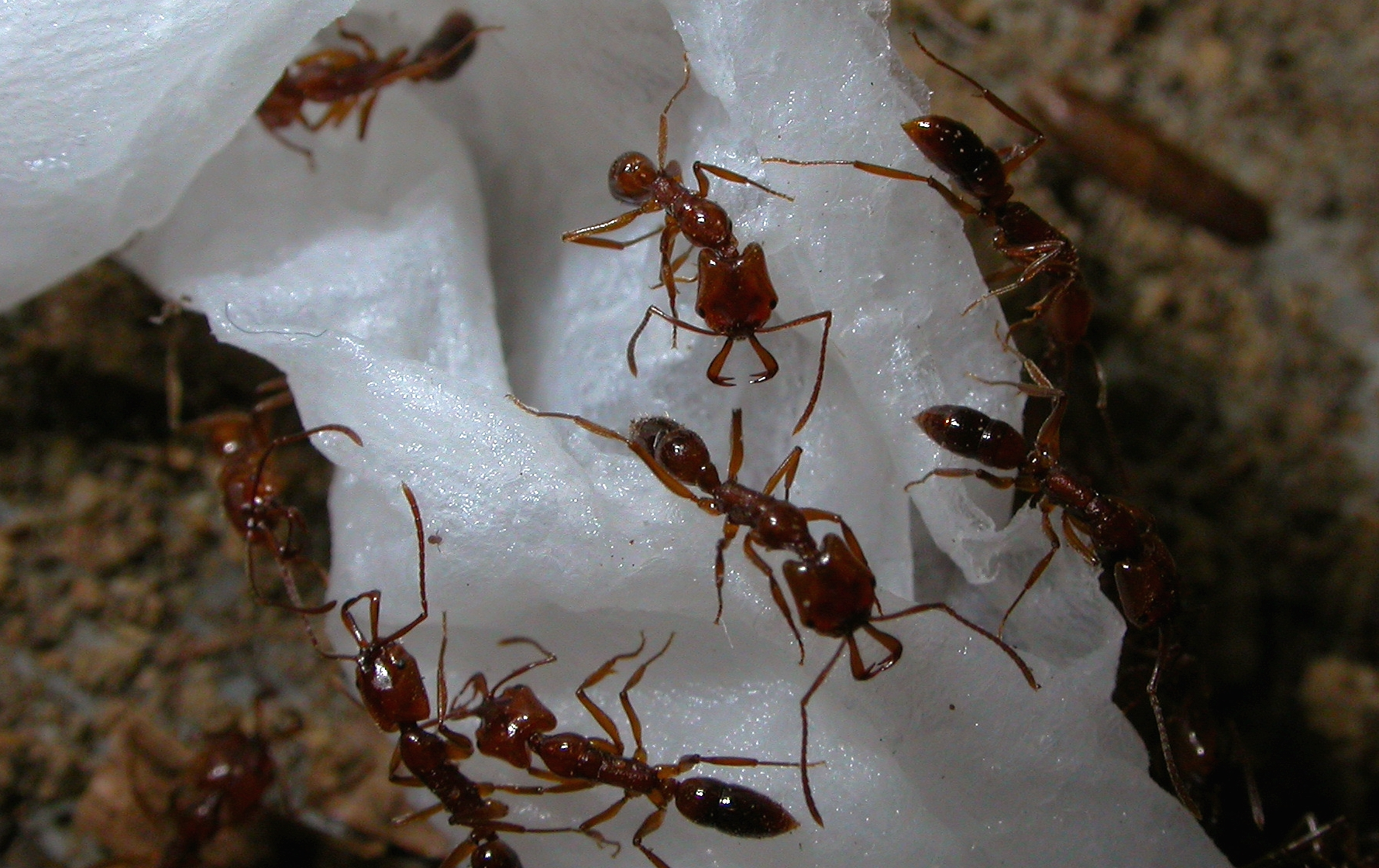

Scientific classification
- Kingdom: Animalia
- Phylum: Arthropoda
- Clade: Pancrustacea
- Class: Insecta
- Order: Hymenoptera
- Family: Formicidae
- Genus: Anochetus
- Species: A. ghilianii

Binomial name
- Anochetus ghilianii (Spinola, 1851)

= Anochetus ghilianii =

Ant species

Anochetus ghilianii is a species of ant of the subfamily Ponerinae, which is native to Morocco, and it also has a not confirmed status in Gibraltar and Spain, as scientists are not sure whether its native or exotic due having a very low area where it lives in the Iberian peninsula (Only found in the province of Cadiz in Spain).

The species is monogynous, the queens of this species is ergatoid, meaning that it does not have wings. However, the males from the colony do have wings. The worker numbers can vary from 250 to 300 in the early months of the year to just 10 to 50 in the summer, thus the colonies are not very big and the nests are usually 20-30cm deep.

== How to identify ==
This species is very easy to identify from other species, as there are no other Ponerinae trap jaw ant species in Morocco and the Iberian Peninsula. Also, the other trap jaw ants in these countries are from the Strumigenys genus and have triangular heads instead of hexagonal heads. These things mean that it is impossible to confuse it for another species from those countries.

== Defense and attack ==
Just like other Anochetus and Odontomachus species, this species has both a stinger and its iconic mandibles which they use to defend themselves and get prey. The stinger is used to inject a toxin that paralyses its pray. The mandibles can be both used to bite and snap it against something to propel themselves backwards for a quick escape.
