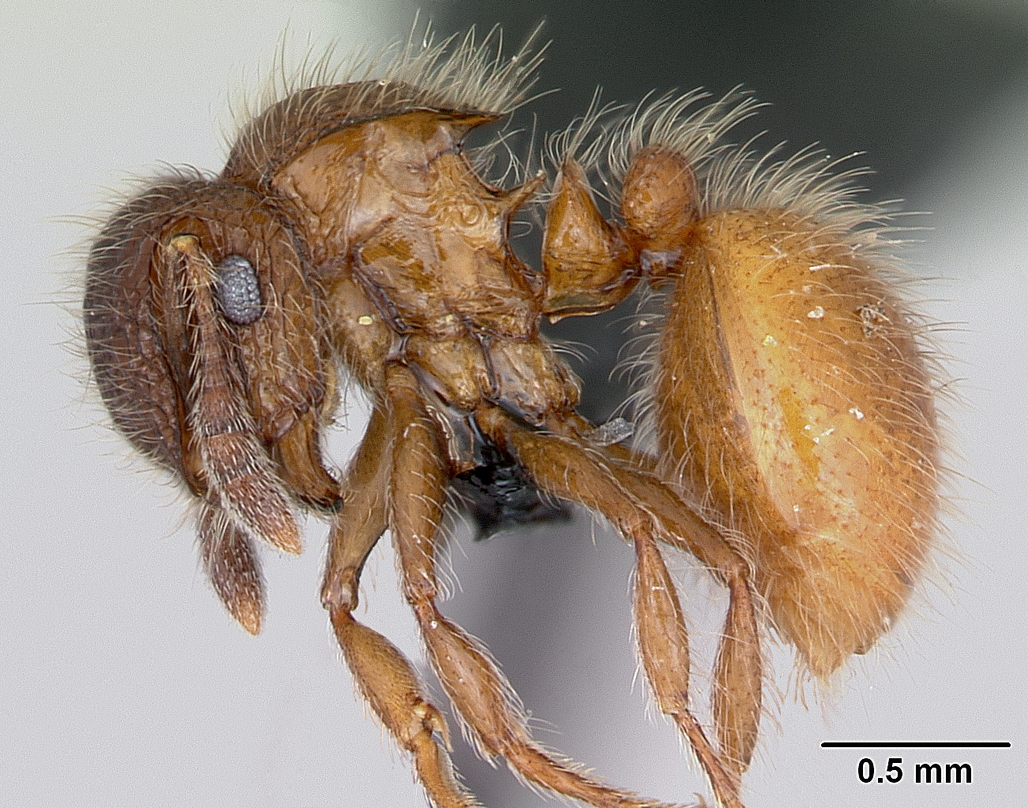
- M. radamae worker

Scientific classification
- Domain: Eukaryota
- Kingdom: Animalia
- Phylum: Arthropoda
- Class: Insecta
- Order: Hymenoptera
- Family: Formicidae
- Subfamily: Myrmicinae
- Genus: Meranoplus
- Species: M. radamae

Binomial name
- Meranoplus radamae Forel, 1891

= Meranoplus radamae =

Species of ant

Meranoplus radamae is a Malagasy species of ant in the genus Meranoplus. The species diurnal.

== Distribution ==
Meranoplus radamae is restricted to the grasslands and woodlands of the High Plateau, and the spiny forests of southern Madagascar. Specimens are known from 370 to 1550 m above sea level, and nests have been collected under stones in grassland and from ground nests. A few collections have been made in southern rainforest sites, but these may represent local adaptation to disturbed habitats.
