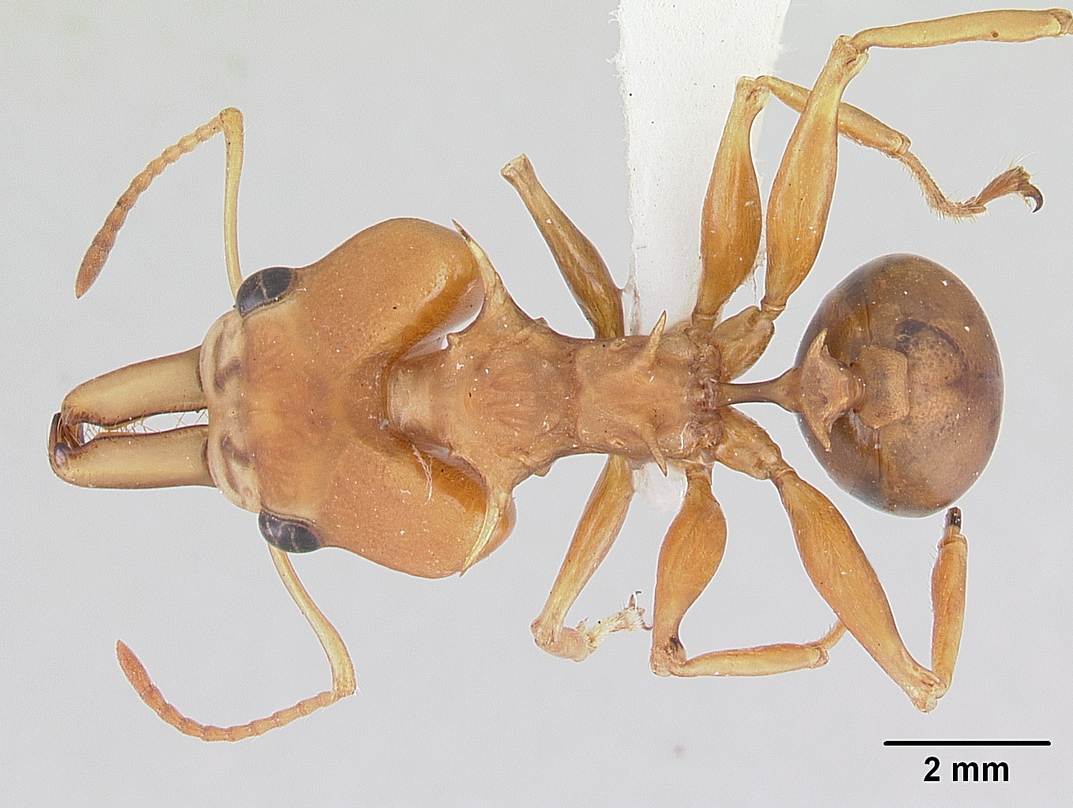
- D. armigerum worker from Brazil

Scientific classification
- Kingdom: Animalia
- Phylum: Arthropoda
- Class: Insecta
- Order: Hymenoptera
- Family: Formicidae
- Subfamily: Myrmicinae
- Genus: Daceton
- Species: D. armigerum

Binomial name
- Daceton armigerum (Latreille, 1802)

Synonyms
- Formica armigera Latreille, 1802

= Daceton armigerum =

Species of ant

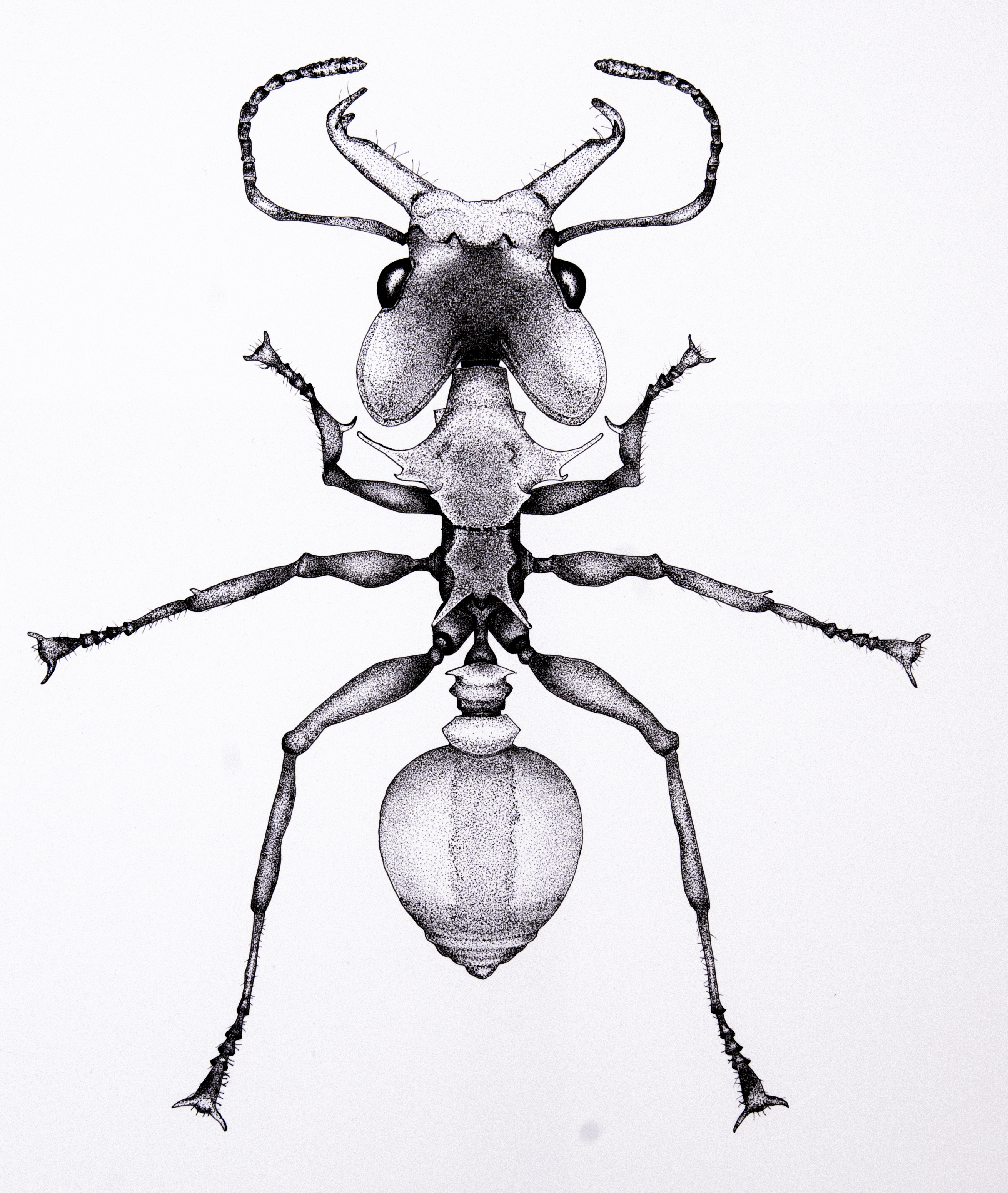
Daceton armigerum

Daceton armigerum is a Neotropical species of arboreal ants, distributed throughout northern South America. D. armigerum combines several traits generally noted in some other arboreal ants i.e., populous colonies, large and/or polydomous nests, intra- and interspecific aggressiveness, trophobiosis, and capturing prey by spread-eagling them.

== Description ==
D. armigerum has a complex continuously polymorphic caste system, in which smaller workers nurse the brood and larger workers hunt, dismember prey items, and defend the nest. The workers have trap-jaw, hypertrophied mandibles that snap together, triggered by sensory hairs situated on the labrum and powering a killer bite. The polymorphism of the worker caste is dramatic, and the size-frequency unimodal (monophasic allometry); foraging workers, themselves highly polymorphic, are larger than those from inside the colony. Workers are so well adapted to arboreal life that when they fall from the forest canopy they are able to glide down onto the trunk of their host tree.

== Habitat and distribution ==
The species is distributed throughout northern South America and is known to occur in the terra firma and flooded forests of Bolivia, Brazil, Colombia, Ecuador, French Guiana, Guyana, Peru, Suriname, Trinidad, and Venezuela.

D. armigerum usually nests in cavities in the branches and trunks of trees previously bored by beetles and other insects. The colonies, which are polygynic (multiple queens) and polydomous (multiple nests), can reach to ca. 952,000 individuals, much more than earlier estimates of 10,000 workers suggested by Wilson (1962). The colonies likely contain multiple egg-laying queens as none of the queens observed in one study had wing stubs. Indeed, in many ant species, non-mated females that remain or return to their nests lose their wings piece by piece, leaving stubs. On the contrary, after the nuptial flight, the queens use their hind legs to tear their wings off. This is possible due to the presence of a line of predetermined weakness situated at the base of wings and results in a neat tear usually considered an indication of having mated.

D. armigerum workers shelter in the small chambers situated at the end of branches on host trees which is reminiscent of the "barracks" leaf nests built by Oecophylla beyond the limits of their territories and containing only old workers.

== Foraging ==
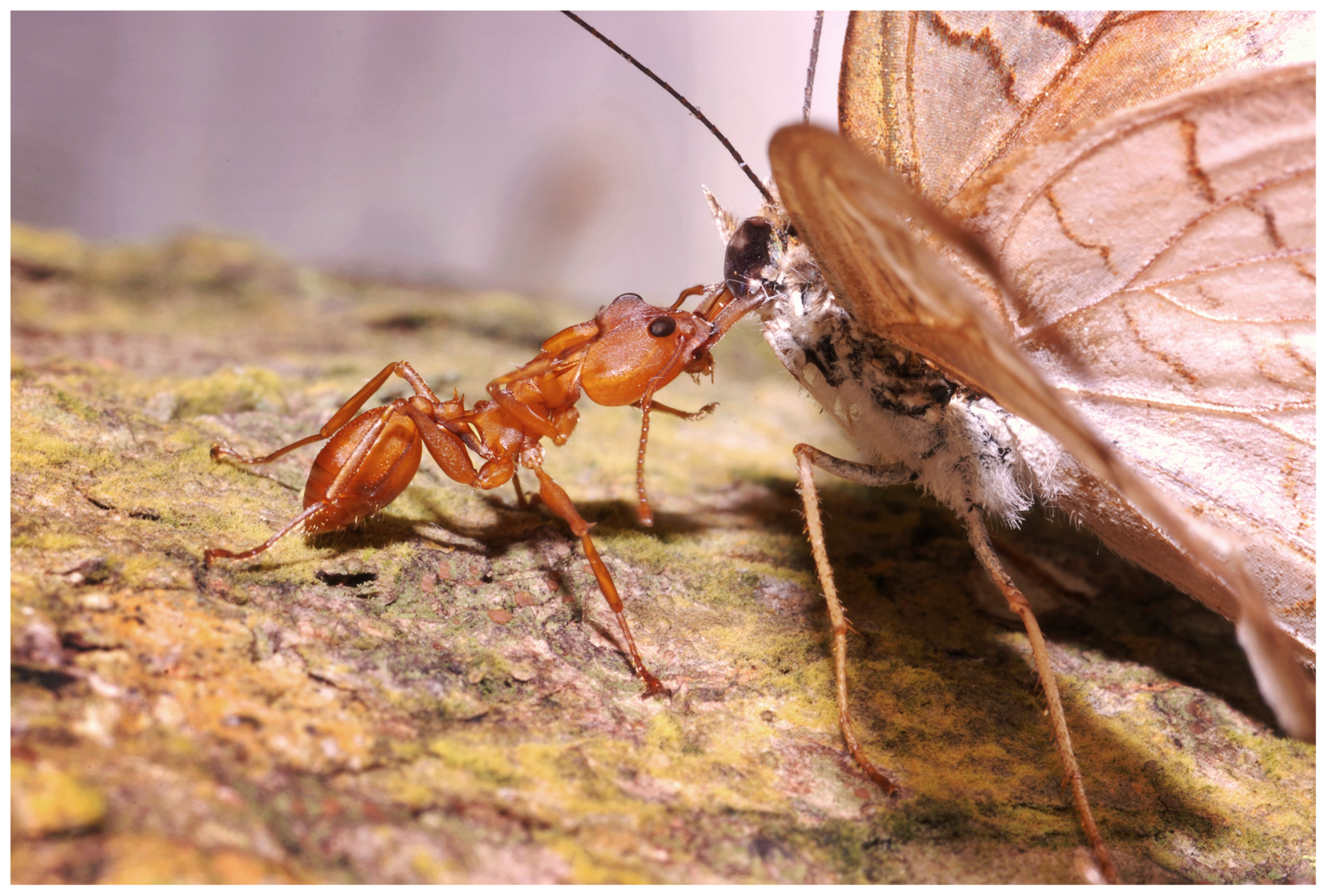
An ambushing Daceton armigerum worker that just seized a nymphalid butterfly after striking it on the head with its long mandibles

Daceton armigerum workers use trail pheromones drawn from poison gland contents that remain active for more than 7 days. Trails laid with the sternal glands, relatively short-lived, serve to recruit nestmates to food patches, while secretions from the pygidial gland release attractants to food at short range (up to 15 cm). Short-range recruitment can also be elicited through visual signals. As they hunt by sight, workers occupy their hunting areas only during the daytime, but stay on chemical trails between nests at night so that the center of their home range is occupied 24 hours a day.

=== Hunting ===
Workers are visual predators that hunt diurnally; by keeping their long trap-jaw mandibles open to ca. 180° they are frequently able to capture a wide range of prey, including relatively large items that they retrieve in groups of up to six ants. During prey capture, the workers can sting the prey; their poison gland contains a mixture of pyrazines. Through group-hunting, short-range recruitment and spread-eagling prey, workers can capture a wide range of arthropods, the largest weighing up to 90 times the weight of an ambushing worker. Daceton armigerum workers ambush mostly on their host-tree branches. Ambushing workers detect prey by sight and can begin their lightning approach before the prey has landed, striking them immediately.

=== Trophobiosis ===
Workers tend different hemipteran taxa (i.e., Coccidae, Pseudococcidae, Membracidae and Aethalionidae). Trophobiosis (tending other organism for food) has been reported only twice for workers tending coccids. Yet, life for arboreal ants, particularly those species with large colonies, cannot only be based on the results of their predatory activity, so that their ability to exploit different plant-derived food sources such as extrafloral nectar and the honeydew of sap-sucking hemipterans is primordial. Trophobiosis may be frequent, but can only be confirmed if observers have access to the uppermost part of the canopy or find a colony restricted to low vegetation.

== Aggressiveness ==
D. armigerum shows both intra- and interspecific aggressiveness. For example, D. armigerum does not share trees with Dolichoderus bispinosus and can compete with aggressive Azteca plant-ants to nest in myrmecophitic Cecropia obtusa. Yet, as already noted for other Neotropical ant species, D. armigerum frequently shares trees with large colonies of other arboreal ants. These situations are not entirely peaceful as D. armigerum workers frequently kill the Crematogaster individuals with which they even share trails and rob their prey (cleptobiosis). Azteca sp. workers likely benefit from having defensive compounds as, when they are trying to rob prey from D. armigerum workers, they are never struck even when within reach; they always retreated if chased.

== Worker variation ==
Most of the within-species morphological variation in D. armigerum workers is manifested in the form of the promesonotum and, to a lesser degree, in the forms of the petiole, postpetiole, and gaster. This variation includes:

- Lateral spines bifurcate, the posterior spine projecting upwards and curving at the tip in major workers, whereas in small or median workers this spine not curving at the tip. In small workers the posterior spine is very short, almost vestigial when viewed in profile, but conspicuous in dorsal view.
- Short, simple, and appressed hairs present on the first gastral tergite in some individuals from Brazil and Peru. On other workers, hairs on the first gastral segment are absent.
- Humeral spines, in smaller workers, vestigial or present as very low carinae. Median and larger-sized workers with humeral tubercles that are spinose or acute.
- The posterior pair of petiolar tubercles reduced, rounded and low in smaller workers, whereas tubercles acute in larger workers.
- Large workers with posterior promesonotal tubercles truncate and flattened in profile.
- Anterior spines of petiole long and diverging with intervening space concave or with intervening space discontinuous. Anterior spines of petiole in smaller workers shorter than in other castes.
