= Meranoplus boltoni =

Scientific classification
- Kingdom: Animalia
- Phylum: Arthropoda
- Clade: Pancrustacea
- Class: Insecta
- Order: Hymenoptera
- Family: Formicidae
- Subfamily: Myrmicinae
- Genus: Meranoplus
- Species: M. boltoni

Binomial name
- Meranoplus boltoni Schödl, 1998

Species of ant

Meranoplus boltoni is a species of ant of the subfamily Myrmicinae. It is found in Sri Lanka.
