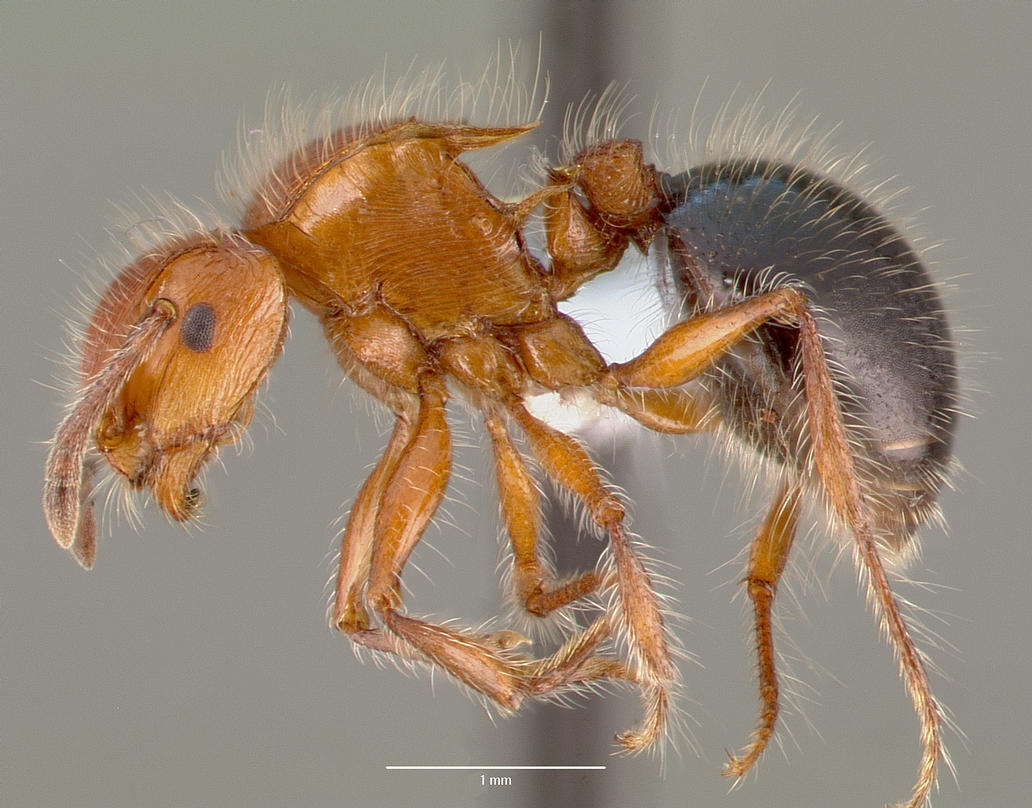
- M. mayri worker

Scientific classification
- Domain: Eukaryota
- Kingdom: Animalia
- Phylum: Arthropoda
- Class: Insecta
- Order: Hymenoptera
- Family: Formicidae
- Subfamily: Myrmicinae
- Genus: Meranoplus
- Species: M. mayri

Binomial name
- Meranoplus mayri Forel, 1910

= Meranoplus mayri =

Species of ant

Meranoplus mayri is a Malagasy species of ant in the genus Meranoplus.

== Distribution ==
Meranoplus mayri is distributed throughout the drier regions of Madagascar from the Southwestern region near Andohahela National Park all the way north into the Mahajanga Province. The elevational range of M. mayri is 20–1345 m.

== Description ==
This species displays subtle variation in morphometric and most sculptural characters across its range except for the sculpture of the base of abdominal tergum IV. This character varies from extremely smooth and shining in the southwest to strongly, dense-punctate and costate along the western edge of the High Plateau. Intergrades are common, however, occurring all along the western coast and into the High Plateau. Both smooth and punctate specimens may be found at the same locales, including Ampotoampoto, Ejada, Tsihombe and Ambinanitelo. The variation of this character indicates that although the two extremes are reproductively isolated by distance and geography, but are otherwise linked across their range by intermediate populations.

== Biology ==
As with most of the diversity of Meranoplus, nothing is known about the behavior or ecology of M. mayri except that its ground nests may be found in urban gardens, grasslands, and deciduous and spiny forests. This is the most frequently collected Malagasy Meranoplus, with numerous specimens captured in pitfalls, malaise traps, and hand collections. Although few collections have been made of this species in the High Plateau region, it is predicted that they may be found there as well.
