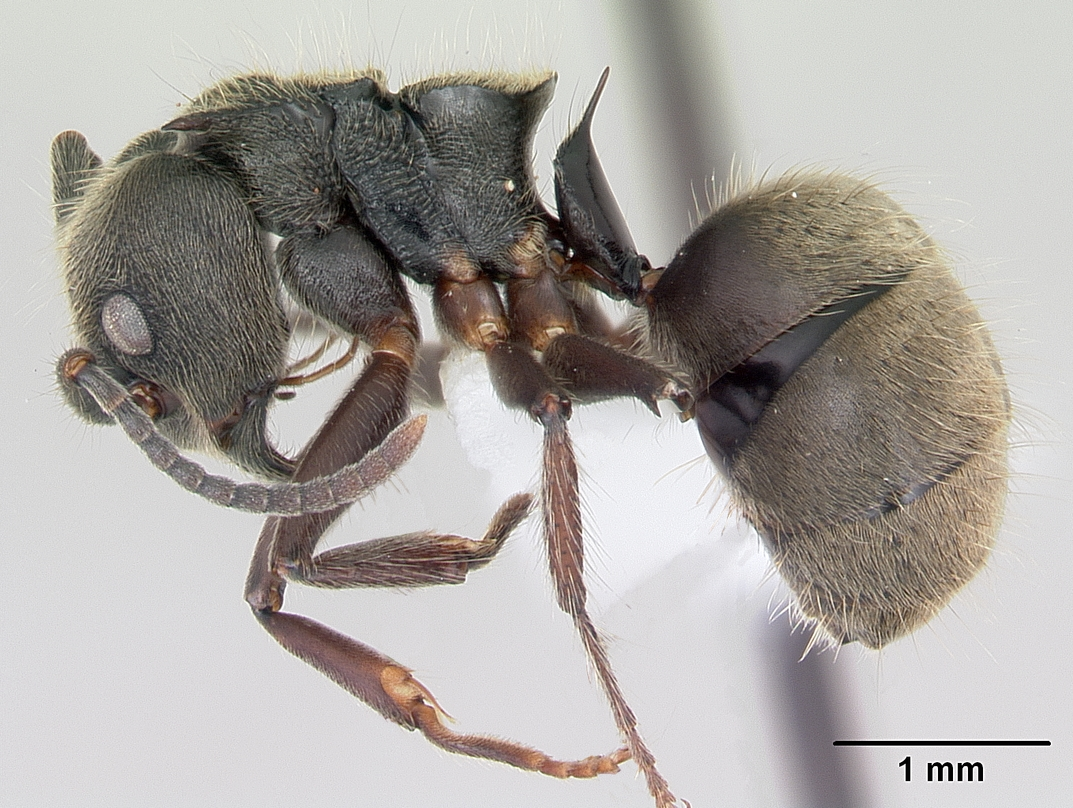

Scientific classification
- Domain: Eukaryota
- Kingdom: Animalia
- Phylum: Arthropoda
- Class: Insecta
- Order: Hymenoptera
- Family: Formicidae
- Subfamily: Dolichoderinae
- Genus: Dolichoderus
- Species: D. bispinosus

Binomial name
- Dolichoderus bispinosus (Olivier, 1792)

Synonyms
- Formica fungosa Fabricius, 1798; Hypoclinea vestita Mayr, 1862; Polyrhachis arboricola Norton, 1868

= Dolichoderus bispinosus =

Species of ant

Dolichoderus bispinosus is a species of ant in the genus Dolichoderus. Described by Olivier in 1792, the species is found in many countries, including Belize, Brazil, Colombia, Costa Rica, French Guiana, Guatemala, Guyana, Honduras, Mexico, Panama, Paraguay, Peru, Suriname, Trinidad and Tobago, Venezuela.
