= Cotriguaçu =

- Municipality
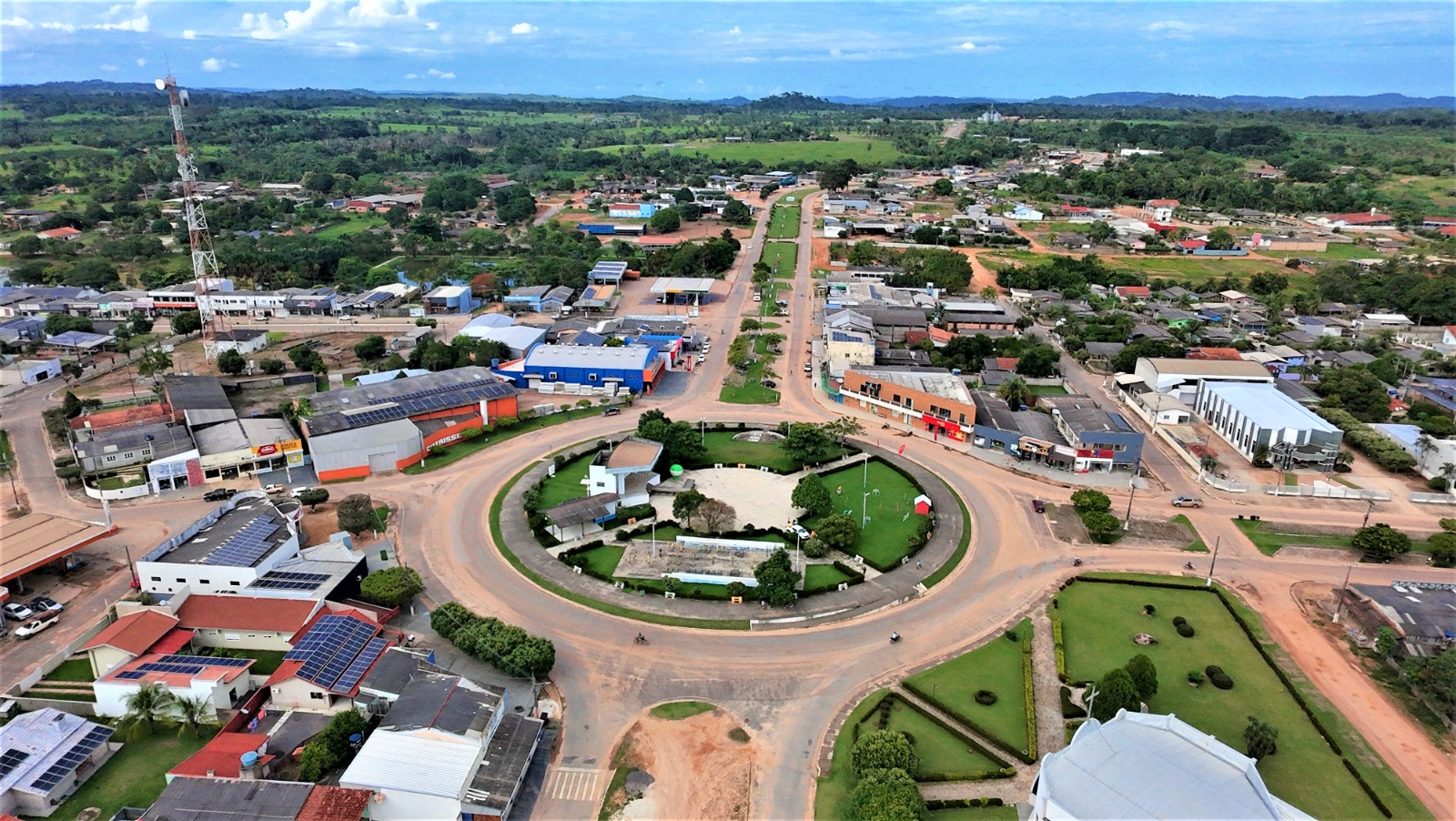

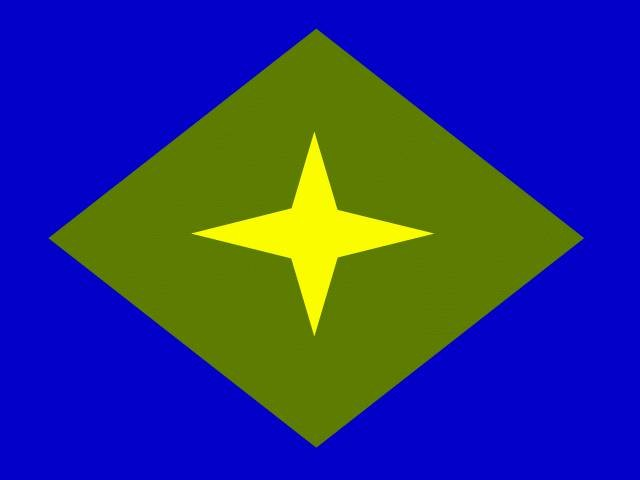
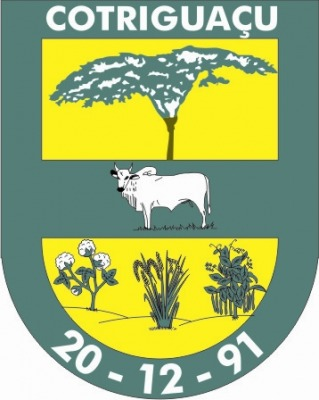
- Flag Coat of arms

- Location in Mato Grosso
- Coordinates: 9.85778°S 58.4139°W
- Country: Brazil
- Region: Center-West
- State: Mato Grosso
- Mesoregion: Norte Mato-Grossense

Population (2020)
  - Total: 20,238
- Time zone: UTC−3 (BRT)

Cotriguaçu is a municipality in the state of Mato Grosso in the Central-West Region of Brazil.

The municipality contains part of the 19,582-square-kilometer (7,561-sq-mi) Juruena National Park, one of the largest conservation units in Brazil. It contains 56% of the 227,817-hectare (562,950-acre) Igarapés do Juruena State Park, created in 2002. The Igarapés do Juruena State Park overlaps by almost 53% with the Juruena National Park.

== See also ==
- List of municipalities in Mato Grosso

== Sources ==
- PES Igarapés do Juruena (in Portuguese), ISA: Instituto Socioambiental
- Unidade de Conservação: Parque Nacional do Juruena (in Portuguese), MMA: Ministério do Meio Ambiente
