= Anochetus nietneri =

Scientific classification
- Kingdom: Animalia
- Phylum: Arthropoda
- Clade: Pancrustacea
- Class: Insecta
- Order: Hymenoptera
- Family: Formicidae
- Genus: Anochetus
- Species: A. nietneri

Binomial name
- Anochetus nietneri (Roger, 1861)

Species of ant

Anochetus nietneri is a species of ant of the subfamily Ponerinae, which can be found from Sri Lanka.
