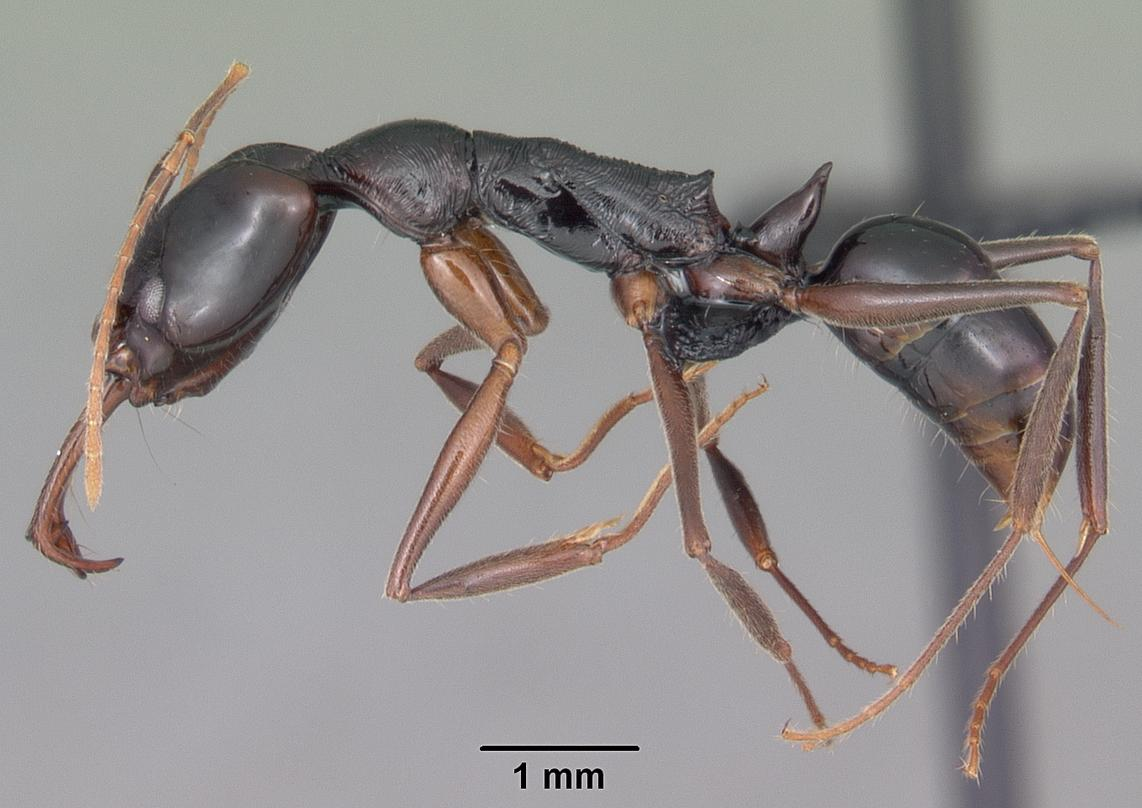
- Anochetus boltoni worker, holotype

Scientific classification
- Domain: Eukaryota
- Kingdom: Animalia
- Phylum: Arthropoda
- Class: Insecta
- Order: Hymenoptera
- Family: Formicidae
- Genus: Anochetus
- Species: A. boltoni

Binomial name
- Anochetus boltoni B. L. Fisher & M. A. Smith, 2008

= Anochetus boltoni =

Species of ant

Anochetus boltoni is a species of ant in the genus Anochetus. It was discovered in 2003 by B. L. Fisher in Madagascar and described by Fisher, B. L. & Smith, M. A. in 2008.
