= Monomorium boltoni =

Scientific classification
- Kingdom: Animalia
- Phylum: Arthropoda
- Clade: Pancrustacea
- Class: Insecta
- Order: Hymenoptera
- Family: Formicidae
- Subfamily: Myrmicinae
- Genus: Monomorium
- Species: M. boltoni

Binomial name
- Monomorium boltoni Espadaler & Agosti, 1987

Species of ant

Monomorium boltoni is a species of Myrmicine ant endemic to Cape Verde, where it is restricted to the island of São Nicolau. The species was first described in 1987.
