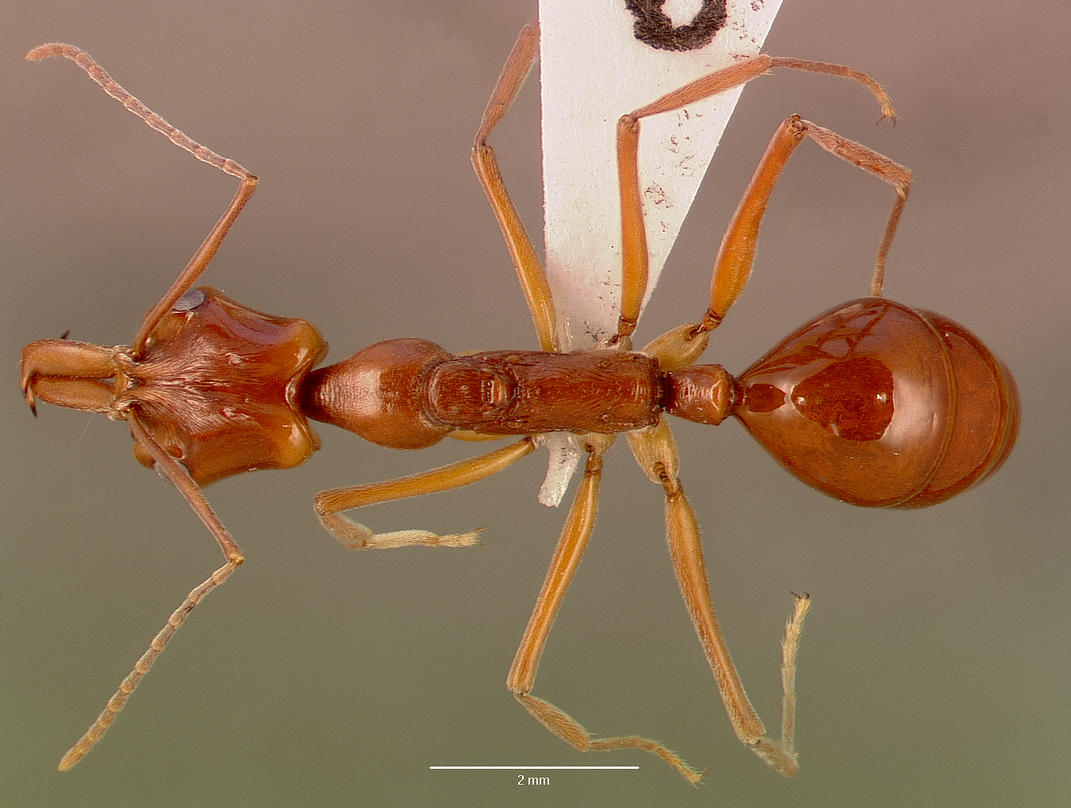
- Anochetus faurei worker

Scientific classification
- Kingdom: Animalia
- Phylum: Arthropoda
- Class: Insecta
- Order: Hymenoptera
- Family: Formicidae
- Subfamily: Ponerinae
- Tribe: Ponerini
- Genus: Anochetus; Mayr, 1861

Type species
- Odontomachus ghilianii

Diversity
- 122 species

Synonyms
- Myrmapatetes Wheeler, 1929; Stenomyrmex Mayr, 1862

= Anochetus =

Anochetus Temporal range: Burdigalian - Recent

Genus of ants

Anochetus is a genus of small, carnivorous ants found in the tropics and subtropics throughout the world.

This genus is present in both the Old and New World and is certainly native to all continents except Antarctica and Europe. In Europe only a single species, Anochetus ghilianii, has been found, and it is not certain it is native to its European range (Province of Cadiz and Gibraltar). However A. ghilianii is native to Morocco.

Anochetus is of some note due to it being one of the relatively few genera that possess trap-jaws, or specialized long mandibles that have a rapid closing mechanism. However, it is the only other genus, other than Odontomachus that uses the mandibles for predator evasion as well as prey capture.

== Species ==
- Anochetus africanus (Mayr, 1865)
- Anochetus agilis Emery, 1901
- Anochetus alae Shattuck & Slipinska, 2012
- Anochetus altisquamis Mayr, 1887
- †Anochetus ambiguus De Andrade, 1994
- Anochetus angolensis Brown, 1978
- Anochetus armstrongi McAreavey, 1949
- Anochetus avius Shattuck & Slipinska, 2012
- Anochetus bequaerti Forel, 1913
- Anochetus bispinosus (Smith, 1858)
- Anochetus boltoni Fisher & Smith, 2008
- †Anochetus brevidentatus MacKay, 1991
- Anochetus brevis Brown, 1978
- Anochetus bytinskii Kugler & Ionescu, 2007
- Anochetus cato Forel, 1901
- Anochetus chirichinii Emery, 1897
- Anochetus chocoensis Fernández, 2008
- †Anochetus conisquamis De Andrade, 1994
- Anochetus consultans (Walker, 1859)
- †Anochetus corayi Baroni Urbani, 1980
- Anochetus cryptus Bharti & Wachkoo, 2013
- Anochetus daedalus
- Anochetus diegensis Forel, 1912
- †Anochetus dubius De Andrade, 1994
- Anochetus elegans Lattke, 1987
- Anochetus emarginatus (Fabricius, 1804)
- Anochetus evansi Crawley, 1922
- †Anochetus exstinctus De Andrade, 1994
- Anochetus faurei Arnold, 1948
- Anochetus filicornis (Wheeler, 1929)
- Anochetus fricatus Wilson, 1959
- Anochetus fuliginosus Arnold, 1948
- Anochetus ghilianii (Spinola, 1851)
- Anochetus gladiator (Mayr, 1862)
- Anochetus goodmani Fisher & Smith, 2008
- Anochetus graeffei Mayr, 1870
- Anochetus grandidieri Forel, 1891
- Anochetus haytianus Wheeler & Mann, 1914
- Anochetus hohenbergiae Feitosa & Delabie, 2012
- Anochetus horridus Kempf, 1964
- Anochetus inca Wheeler, 1925
- Anochetus incultus Brown, 1978
- Anochetus ineditus Baroni Urbani, 1971
- Anochetus inermis André, 1889
- †Anochetus intermedius De Andrade, 1994
- Anochetus isolatus Mann, 1919
- Anochetus jonesi Arnold, 1926
- Anochetus kanariensis Forel, 1900
- Anochetus katonae Forel, 1907
- Anochetus kempfi Brown, 1978
- Anochetus levaillanti Emery, 1895
- Anochetus leyticus Zettel, 2012
- Anochetus longifossatus Mayr, 1897
- Anochetus longispinus Wheeler, 1936
- †Anochetus lucidus De Andrade, 1994
- Anochetus madagascarensis Forel, 1887
- Anochetus madaraszi Mayr, 1897
- Anochetus maryatiae Nuril Aida & Idris, 2011
- Anochetus maynei Forel, 1913
- Anochetus mayri Emery, 1884
- Anochetus menozzii Donisthorpe, 1941
- Anochetus micans Brown, 1978
- Anochetus minans Mann, 1922
- Anochetus miserabilis González-Campero & Elizalde, 2008
- Anochetus mixtus Radchenko, 1993
- Anochetus modicus Brown, 1978
- Anochetus muzziolii Menozzi, 1932
- Anochetus myops Emery, 1893
- Anochetus natalensis Arnold, 1926
- Anochetus neglectus Emery, 1894
- Anochetus nietneri (Roger, 1861)
- Anochetus obscuratus Santschi, 1911
- Anochetus obscurior Brown, 1978
- Anochetus orchidicola Brown, 1978
- Anochetus oriens Kempf, 1964
- Anochetus orientalis André, 1887
- Anochetus pangantihoni Zettel, 2012
- Anochetus pangens (Walker, 1859)
- Anochetus paripungens Brown, 1978
- Anochetus pattersoni Fisher & Smith, 2008
- Anochetus pellucidus [no authors], 1902
- Anochetus peracer Brown, 1978
- Anochetus princeps Emery, 1884
- Anochetus pubescens Brown, 1978
- Anochetus punctaticeps Mayr, 1901
- Anochetus pupulatus Brown, 1978
- Anochetus rectangularis Mayr, 1876
- Anochetus renatae Shattuck & Slipinska, 2012
- Anochetus risii Forel, 1900
- Anochetus rossi Donisthorpe, 1949
- Anochetus rothschildi Forel, 1907
- Anochetus rufolatus Shattuck & Slipinska, 2012
- Anochetus rufostenus Shattuck & Slipinska, 2012
- Anochetus rufus (Jerdon, 1851)
- Anochetus ruginotus Stitz, 1925
- Anochetus rugosus (Smith, 1857)
- Anochetus schoedli Zettel, 2012
- Anochetus sedilloti Emery, 1884
- Anochetus seminiger Donisthorpe, 1943
- Anochetus shohki Terayama, 1996
- Anochetus simoni Emery, 1890
- Anochetus siphneus Brown, 1978
- Anochetus splendidulus Yasumatsu, 1940
- Anochetus striatulus Emery, 1890
- Anochetus strigatellus Brown, 1978
- Anochetus subcoecus Forel, 1912
- Anochetus taiwaniensis Terayama, 1989
- Anochetus talpa Forel, 1901
- Anochetus targionii Emery, 1894
- Anochetus testaceus Forel, 1893
- Anochetus traegaordhi Mayr, 1904
- Anochetus tua Brown, 1978
- Anochetus turneri Forel, 1900
- Anochetus validus Bharti & Wachkoo, 2013
- Anochetus vallensis Lattke, 1987
- Anochetus variegatus Donisthorpe, 1938
- Anochetus veronicae Shattuck & Slipinska, 2012
- Anochetus vexator Kempf, 1964
- Anochetus victoriae Shattuck & Slipinska, 2012
- Anochetus werneri Zettel, 2012
- Anochetus wiesiae Shattuck & Slipinska, 2012
- Anochetus yerburyi Forel, 1900
- Anochetus yunnanensis Wang, 1993
