= John Nietner =

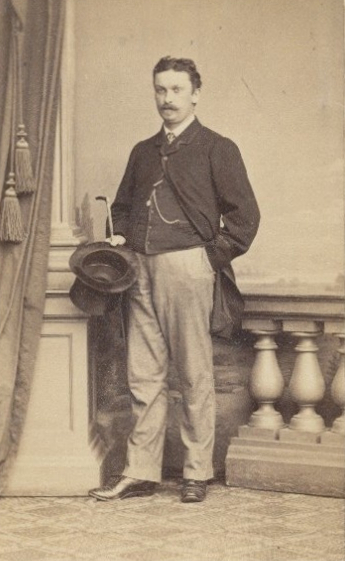
John Nietner in 1862

John Nietner born Johannes Werner Theodor Nietner (19 May 1828 - 21 February 1874) was a Prussian-born naturalist chiefly interested in botany and entomology. Born in Potsdam, he became a naturalized British citizen and owned a coffee plantation in Ceylon. During his stay in Ceylon from 1851 to 1874 he collected and described numerous insect species from the island. He also sent specimens for study by experts in Europe and many species such as Cethosia nietneri were named after him by others. Interested in insect pests, he wrote a booklet on the pests of coffee in 1861.

== Biography ==
Johannes was born in Paretz, near Potsdam where his father Theodor Eduard Nietner (1790-1871) and mother Charlotte Louise Albertine or Bertha née Sello (1802-1835) belonged to court-gardener families. Theodor worked from 1822 as head gardener in the court of Queen Louise and Friedrich Wilhelm III. Bertha belonged to the court-gardener family of Sello and two of her brothers worked in the gardens at Sanssouci. In 1832 the family moved to Niederschönhausen which was the summer home of Queen Elisabeth Christine. Bertha died in 1835 after the birth of a son. Johannes studied at the Berlin Gymnasium. Travel and exploration was in the family, Friedrich Sello, a maternal cousin, explored Brazil. Johannes' brothers Theodor, Louis, and Paul became gardeners in the family tradition. Louis moved to Java in 1848 to work as a gardener in the Dutch East India Company and died there in June the next year. A footnote by Johannes' father to a note by the son states that an opportunity in Ceylon came up after a visit to Dr John Lindley at his garden in Chiswick near London. Lindley suggested a place in Ceylon where Nietner could work and this may possibly have been an estate belonging to the Berlin banker Ferdinand Moritz Delmar (1781-1858). Nietner set off to Ceylon in spring 1851 via Alexandria and Suez to take up the position. He was in close contact with G.H.K. Thwaites, the director of the Peradeniya Botanical Garden. A letter to the Berlin Entomological Journal of 1857 informed entomologists interested in specimen collections from Ceylon to reach him through his father, Hofgärtner Nietner at Niederschönhausen at Berlin. His collections from Ceylon, including those that were sent to European collaborators (the most prominent being Carl August Dohrn, Victor Motschulsky, Hermann August Hagen, Hermann Loew and Gustav A. Kraatz) are now found at the German Entomological Institute, in the Museum of Natural History in Berlin, the Natural History Museum in Vienna and the Natural History Museum in London (where they are in the collections of Dr. Thwaites).

Nietner subsequently bought an estate in Ramboda (Rambodde) eight miles from Kandawalle in Katoo-kandy. According to Rohan Pethiyagoda, Nietner began to work in 1853 with A. & R. Crowe and Co. in Colombo and around 1857 he bought Fernlands Estate at Pundulu Oya "by his industry and thrifty diligence" along with Staniforth Green, an uncle of the entomologist E. E. Green. When he visited Germany in 1863 he could claim to be an established plantation owner as noted in a newspaper clipping kept by his sister Pauline. He married Julie Burghalter on this visit and returned to Ceylon with his wife. Nietner made several tours in which he explored botany, specifically seeking novel plants of economic value (especially nut bearing trees) suitable for cultivation in Ceylon. He travelled to the Sunda Islands, Mauritius (Reunion/Bourbon), and across India. He explored the Himalayas in January 1853 starting from Bengal and travelling through Delhi, Kashmir, followed by visits Nainital and Almora. He also traversed southern India on foot, carriage and palanquin, from the Western Ghats to the Coromandel coast. He continued making collections and sending them to his father who handled their sale to various collectors. The Nietners set out to return to Germany in 1874 but John died en route on February 21 of dysentery and is buried in the General Cemetery (Kanatta), in Colombo. His widow returned to the family home at Potsdam and the collections that she held were probably destroyed in the First World War.

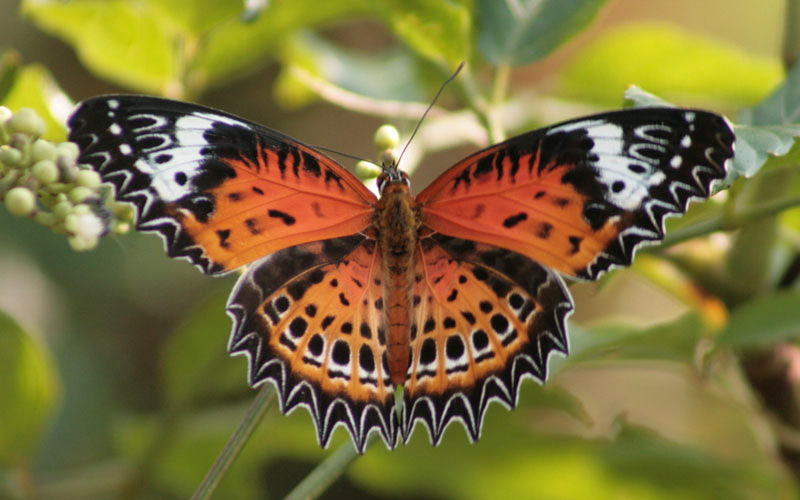
Cethosia nietneri, the Tamil lacewing, a butterfly from Ceylon

His death was recorded by the Asiatic Society of Bengal, of which he was a corresponding member from 1857, only in 1887. Ernst Haeckel received a copy of G.H.K. Thwaites' Enumeratio Plantarum Zeylaniae (1864) from Nietner’s widow in 1883 prior to setting sail for Ceylon.

Among the species named after Nietner are the dragonfly Heliogomphus nietneri, the wasp Microterys nietneri, the ants Anochetus nietneri, Pheidole nietneri, the strepsipteran Myrmecolax nietneri, the butterfly Cethosia nietneri; and the bryophytes Lejeunea nietneri, Acroporium nietnerianum and Radula nietneri. The red-breasted flycatcher (Ficedula parva) was first found wintering in Ceylon by Nietner and it was described by Cabanis as Muscicapa hyperythra and referred to as Nietner's robin flycatcher.

== Works ==
Many of Nietner's early botanical, gardening, and travel notes were in German and published in the Allgemeine Gartenzeitung ("General Garden News") which was edited by his father. These included short notes on novelties such as a large coconut palm from Ceylon. He used the English version of his name John in his later English language publications. In one of his early entomological works, he wrote an introductory piece on the problems with research in far-away places, his lack of access to research and collections and a resentment of the attitudes of European entomologists who treated him as a mere collector. His English language publications include:

- Products of Ceylon at Paris Universal Exhibition. 'Ceylon Almanac' 1856.
- Entomological papers, being chiefly descriptions of new Ceylon Coleoptera with such observations on their habits etc., as appear in any way interesting. J. Asiat. Soc. Bengal 25: 381-394, 523-554 (1856).
- Descriptions of new Ceylon Coleoptera. Ann. Mag. Nat. Hist. (2)19:241-249, 374-388; (2)20:368-375 (1857)
- Entomological papers, being chiefly descriptions of new Ceylon Coleoptera with such observations on their habits etc., as appear in any way interesting. J. Asiat. Soc. Bengal 26: 132-153 (1857).
- Descriptions of new Ceylon Coleoptera. Ann. Mag. Nat. Hist. (3)2: 175-183, 418-431 (1858).
- Observations on the enemies of the coffee tree in Ceylon. Colombo, Ceylon : Ceylon Times. 31 pp. (1861). A second edition revised by S. Green was published as The coffee tree and its enemies: being observations on the natural history of the enemies of the coffee tree in Ceylon. Colombo : A.M. & J. Ferguson (1880).
