= Anelaphus nitidipennis =

Scientific classification
- Kingdom: Animalia
- Phylum: Arthropoda
- Clade: Pancrustacea
- Class: Insecta
- Order: Coleoptera
- Suborder: Polyphaga
- Infraorder: Cucujiformia
- Family: Cerambycidae
- Genus: Anelaphus
- Species: A. nitidipennis

Binomial name
- Anelaphus nitidipennis Chemsak & Linsley, 1968

Species of beetle

Anelaphus nitidipennis is a species of beetle in the family Cerambycidae. It was described by Chemsak and Linsley in 1968.
