= Anelaphus albopilus =

Scientific classification
- Domain: Eukaryota
- Kingdom: Animalia
- Phylum: Arthropoda
- Class: Insecta
- Order: Coleoptera
- Suborder: Polyphaga
- Infraorder: Cucujiformia
- Family: Cerambycidae
- Genus: Anelaphus
- Species: A. albopilus

Binomial name
- Anelaphus albopilus Chemsak & Noguera, 2003

Species of beetle

Anelaphus albopilus is a species of beetle in the family Cerambycidae. It was described by Chemsak and Noguera in 2003.
