= Anelaphus subfasciatus =

Scientific classification
- Domain: Eukaryota
- Kingdom: Animalia
- Phylum: Arthropoda
- Class: Insecta
- Order: Coleoptera
- Suborder: Polyphaga
- Infraorder: Cucujiformia
- Family: Cerambycidae
- Genus: Anelaphus
- Species: A. subfasciatus

Binomial name
- Anelaphus subfasciatus (Gahan, 1895)

Species of beetle

Anelaphus subfasciatus is a species of beetle in the family Cerambycidae. It was described by Gahan in 1895.
