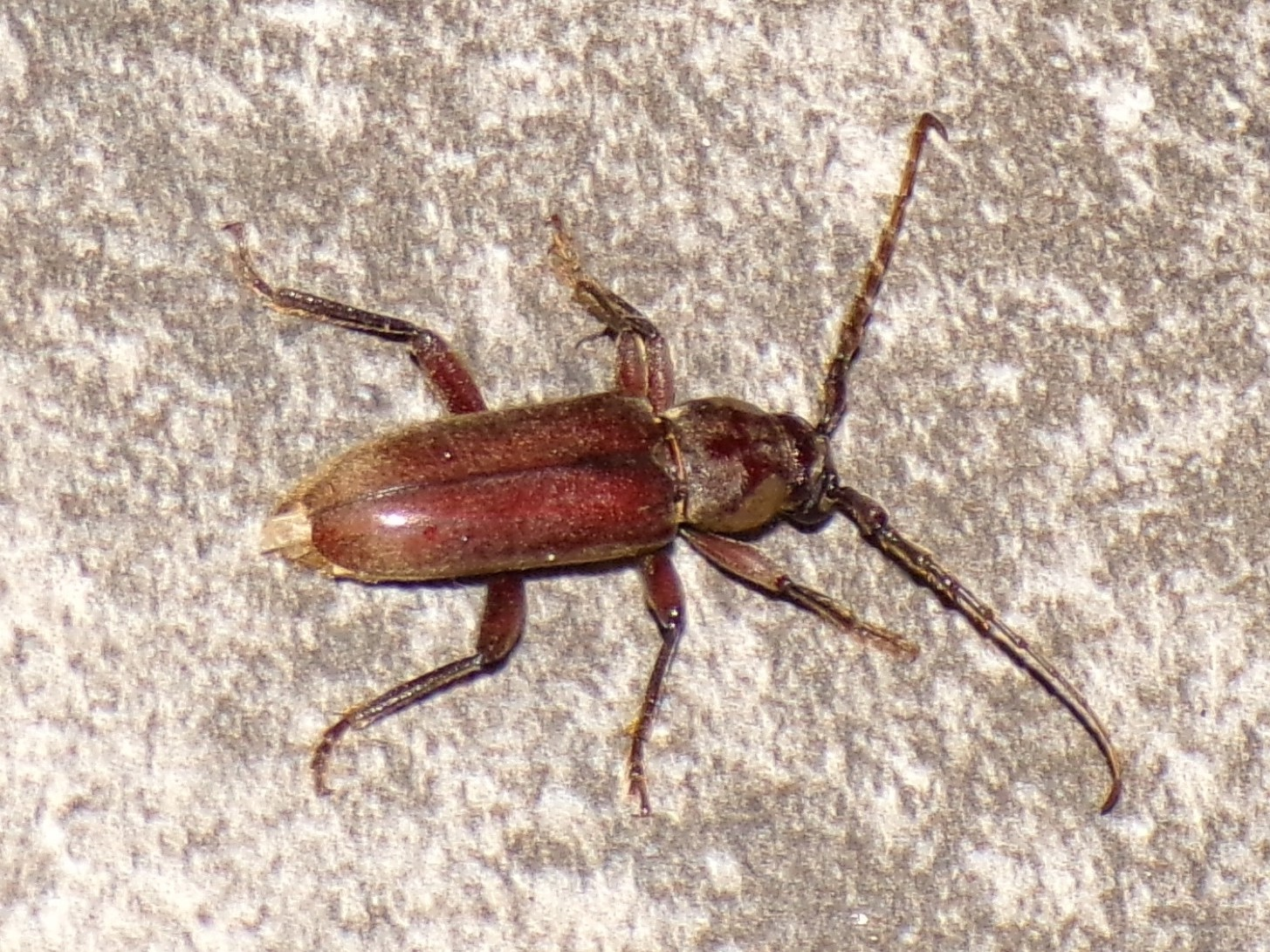

Scientific classification
- Domain: Eukaryota
- Kingdom: Animalia
- Phylum: Arthropoda
- Class: Insecta
- Order: Coleoptera
- Suborder: Polyphaga
- Infraorder: Cucujiformia
- Family: Cerambycidae
- Genus: Anelaphus
- Species: A. badius

Binomial name
- Anelaphus badius Chemsak, 1991

= Anelaphus badius =

Species of beetle

Anelaphus badius is a species of beetle in the family Cerambycidae. It was first described by Chemsak in 1991.
