= Anelaphus trinidadensis =

Scientific classification
- Domain: Eukaryota
- Kingdom: Animalia
- Phylum: Arthropoda
- Class: Insecta
- Order: Coleoptera
- Suborder: Polyphaga
- Infraorder: Cucujiformia
- Family: Cerambycidae
- Genus: Anelaphus
- Species: A. trinidadensis

Binomial name
- Anelaphus trinidadensis Martins & Galileo, 2010

Species of beetle

Anelaphus trinidadensis is a species of beetle in the family Cerambycidae. It was described by Martins and Galileo in 2010.
