= Anelaphus guttiventre =

Scientific classification
- Domain: Eukaryota
- Kingdom: Animalia
- Phylum: Arthropoda
- Class: Insecta
- Order: Coleoptera
- Suborder: Polyphaga
- Infraorder: Cucujiformia
- Family: Cerambycidae
- Genus: Anelaphus
- Species: A. guttiventre

Binomial name
- Anelaphus guttiventre (Chevrolat, 1862)

Species of beetle

Anelaphus guttiventre is a species of beetle in the family Cerambycidae. It was described by Louis Alexandre Auguste Chevrolat in 1862.
