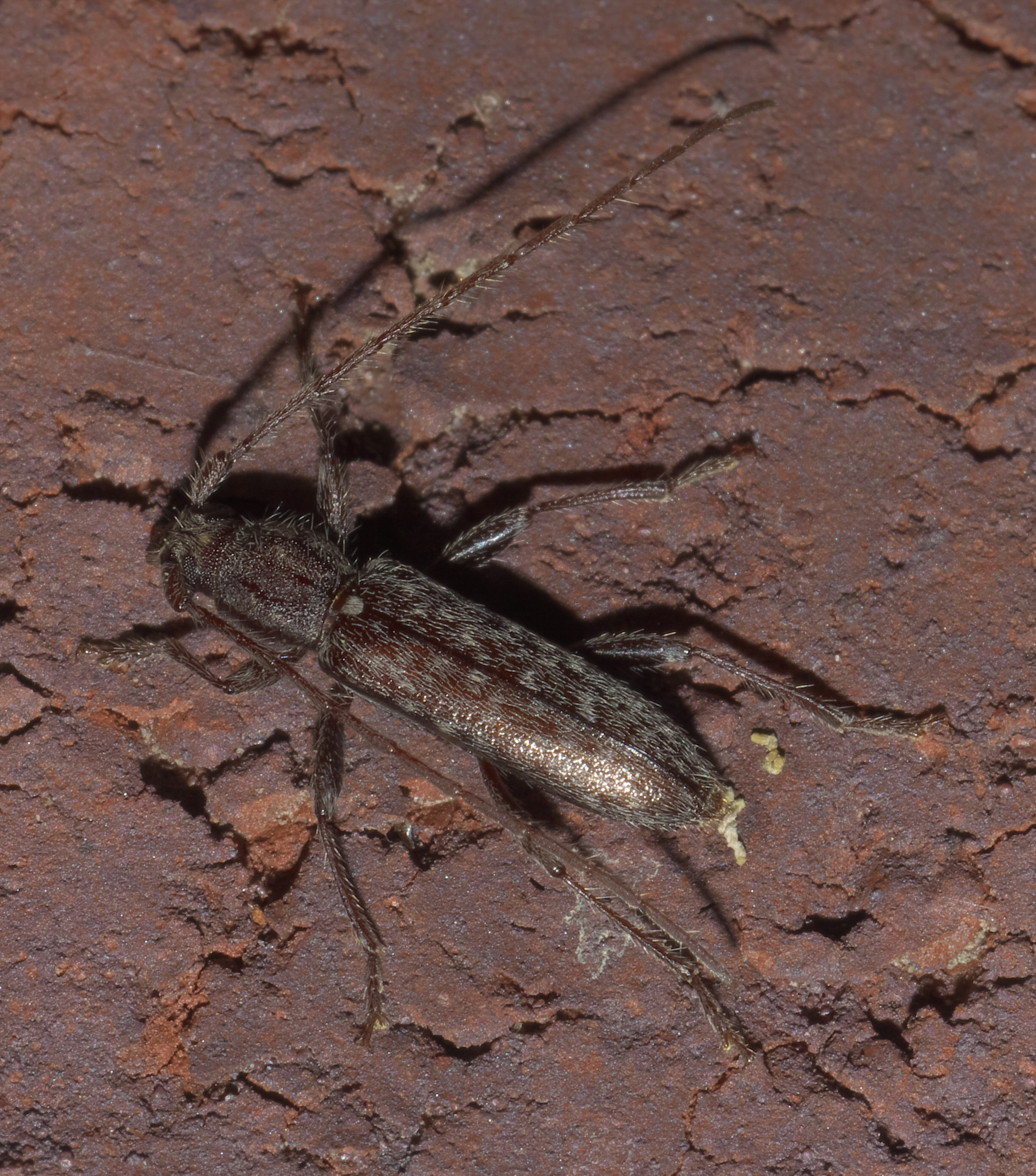
- Anelaphus pumilus

Scientific classification
- Kingdom: Animalia
- Phylum: Arthropoda
- Clade: Pancrustacea
- Class: Insecta
- Order: Coleoptera
- Suborder: Polyphaga
- Infraorder: Cucujiformia
- Family: Cerambycidae
- Subfamily: Cerambycinae
- Tribe: Elaphidiini
- Genus: Anelaphus; Linsley, 1936

Synonyms
- Peranoplium Linsley, 1957; Elaphidionoides Linsley, 1957; Gymnopsyra Linsley, 1937

= Anelaphus =

Genus of beetles

Anelaphus is a genus of beetles in the family Cerambycidae, first described by Earle Linsley in 1936.

== Species ==
Anelaphus contains the following species:

- Anelaphus albofasciatus (Linell, 1897)
- Anelaphus albopilus Chemsak & Noguera, 2003
- Anelaphus asperus (Knull, 1962)
- Anelaphus badius Chemsak, 1991
- Anelaphus belkini Skiles, 1985
- Anelaphus bravoi Galileo & Martins, 2010
- Anelaphus brevidens (Schaeffer, 1908)
- Anelaphus brummermannae Lingafelter, 2020
- Anelaphus bupalpus (Chemsak, 1991)
- Anelaphus cerussatus (Newman, 1841)
- Anelaphus cinereus (Olivier, 1795)
- Anelaphus cinnabarinus Fisher, 1942
- Anelaphus colombianus Martins & Galileo, 2003
- Anelaphus cordiforme Tyson, 2013
- Anelaphus crispulus (Fisher, 1947)
- Anelaphus curacaoensis Gilmour, 1968
- Anelaphus daedaleus (Bates, 1874)
- Anelaphus debilis (LeConte, 1854)
- Anelaphus dentatus Chemsak, 1962
- Anelaphus erakyra Galileo, Martins & Santos-Silva, 2015
- Anelaphus erici Santos-Silva, 2021
- Anelaphus eximius (Bates, 1885)
- Anelaphus fasciatum Fisher, 1932
- Anelaphus flavofasciatus Nascimento, 2018
- Anelaphus giesberti Chemsak & Linsley, 1979
- Anelaphus guttiventre (Chevrolat, 1862)
- Anelaphus hirtus Chemsak & Noguera, 2003
- Anelaphus hispaniolae Fisher, 1932
- Anelaphus inermis (Newman, 1840)
- Anelaphus inflaticollis Chemsak, 1959
- Anelaphus inornatus (Chemsak & Linsley, 1979)
- Anelaphus izabalensis Santos-Silva, 2021
- Anelaphus jansoni Linsley, 1961
- Anelaphus lanuginosus (Bates, 1885)
- Anelaphus lingafelteri Touroult, 2014
- Anelaphus maculatum (Chemsak & Noguera, 1993)
- Anelaphus magnipunctatus (Knull, 1934)
- Anelaphus martinsi Monné, 2006
- Anelaphus michelbacheri Linsley, 1942
- Anelaphus misellus (Bates, 1885)
- Anelaphus moestus (LeConte, 1854)
- Anelaphus mutatus (Gahan, 1890)
- Anelaphus nanus (Fabricius, 1792)
- Anelaphus nitidipennis Chemsak & Linsley, 1968
- Anelaphus niveivestitus (Schaeffer, 1905)
- Anelaphus panamensis Linsley, 1961
- Anelaphus piceus (Chemsak, 1962)
- Anelaphus pilosus Chemsak & Noguera, 2003
- Anelaphus praeclarus Lingafelter, 2008
- Anelaphus pumilus (Newman, 1840)
- Anelaphus punctatus (LeConte, 1873)
- Anelaphus robi Hrabovsky, 1987
- Anelaphus rotundus Vlasak & Santos-Silva, 2020
- Anelaphus savinai Audureau, 2021
- Anelaphus similis (Schaeffer, 1908)
- Anelaphus souzai (Zajciw, 1964)
- Anelaphus sparsus Martins & Galileo, 2003
- Anelaphus spurcus (LeConte, 1854)
- Anelaphus steveni Santos-Silva, 2021
- Anelaphus subdepressus (Schaeffer, 1904)
- Anelaphus subfasciatus (Gahan, 1895)
- Anelaphus subinermis Linsley, 1957
- Anelaphus submoestus Linsley, 1942
- Anelaphus subseriatus (Bates, 1885)
- Anelaphus tikalinus Chemsak & Noguera, 2003
- Anelaphus transversus (White, 1853)
- Anelaphus trinidadensis Martins & Galileo, 2010
- Anelaphus undulatus (Bates, 1880)
- Anelaphus vandenberghei Devesa, Lingafelter & Santos-Silva, 2021
- †Anelaphus velteni Vitali, 2009
- Anelaphus vernus Chemsak, 1991
- Anelaphus villosus (Fabricius, 1792)
- Anelaphus yucatecus Chemsak & Noguera, 2003
- Anelaphus zacapensis Santos-Silva, 2021
