= Anelaphus michelbacheri =

Scientific classification
- Kingdom: Animalia
- Phylum: Arthropoda
- Clade: Pancrustacea
- Class: Insecta
- Order: Coleoptera
- Suborder: Polyphaga
- Infraorder: Cucujiformia
- Family: Cerambycidae
- Genus: Anelaphus
- Species: A. michelbacheri

Binomial name
- Anelaphus michelbacheri Linsley, 1942

Species of beetle

Anelaphus michelbacheri is a species of beetle in the family Cerambycidae. It was described by Linsley in 1942.
