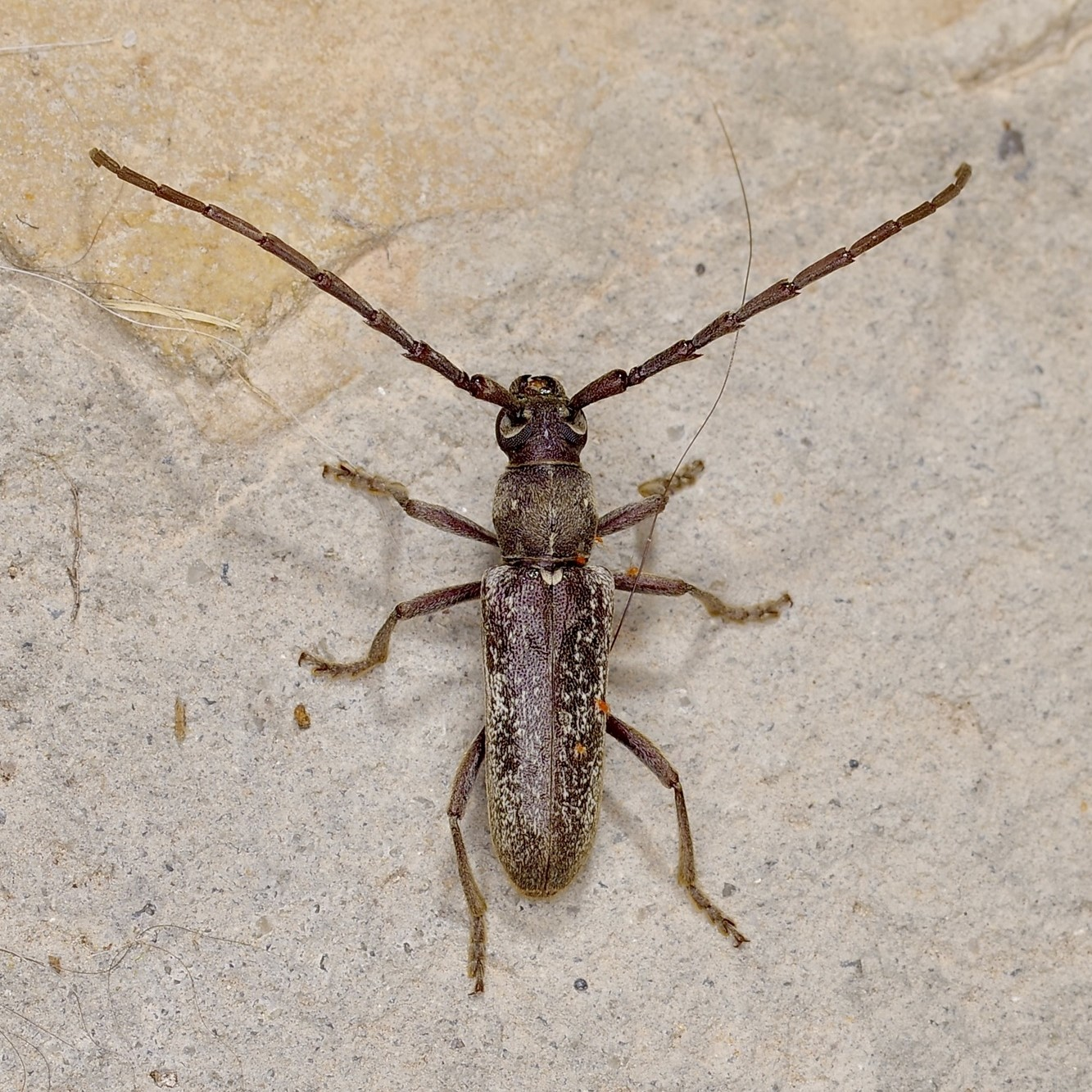

Scientific classification
- Kingdom: Animalia
- Phylum: Arthropoda
- Clade: Pancrustacea
- Class: Insecta
- Order: Coleoptera
- Suborder: Polyphaga
- Infraorder: Cucujiformia
- Family: Cerambycidae
- Genus: Anelaphus
- Species: A. subinermis

Binomial name
- Anelaphus subinermis Linsley, 1957

= Anelaphus subinermis =

Species of beetle

Anelaphus subinermis is a species of beetle in the family Cerambycidae. It was described by Linsley in 1957.
