= Anelaphus niveivestitus =

Scientific classification
- Domain: Eukaryota
- Kingdom: Animalia
- Phylum: Arthropoda
- Class: Insecta
- Order: Coleoptera
- Suborder: Polyphaga
- Infraorder: Cucujiformia
- Family: Cerambycidae
- Genus: Anelaphus
- Species: A. niveivestitus

Binomial name
- Anelaphus niveivestitus (Schaeffer, 1905)

Species of beetle

Anelaphus niveivestitus is a species of beetle in the family Cerambycidae. It was described by Charles Schaeffer in 1905.
