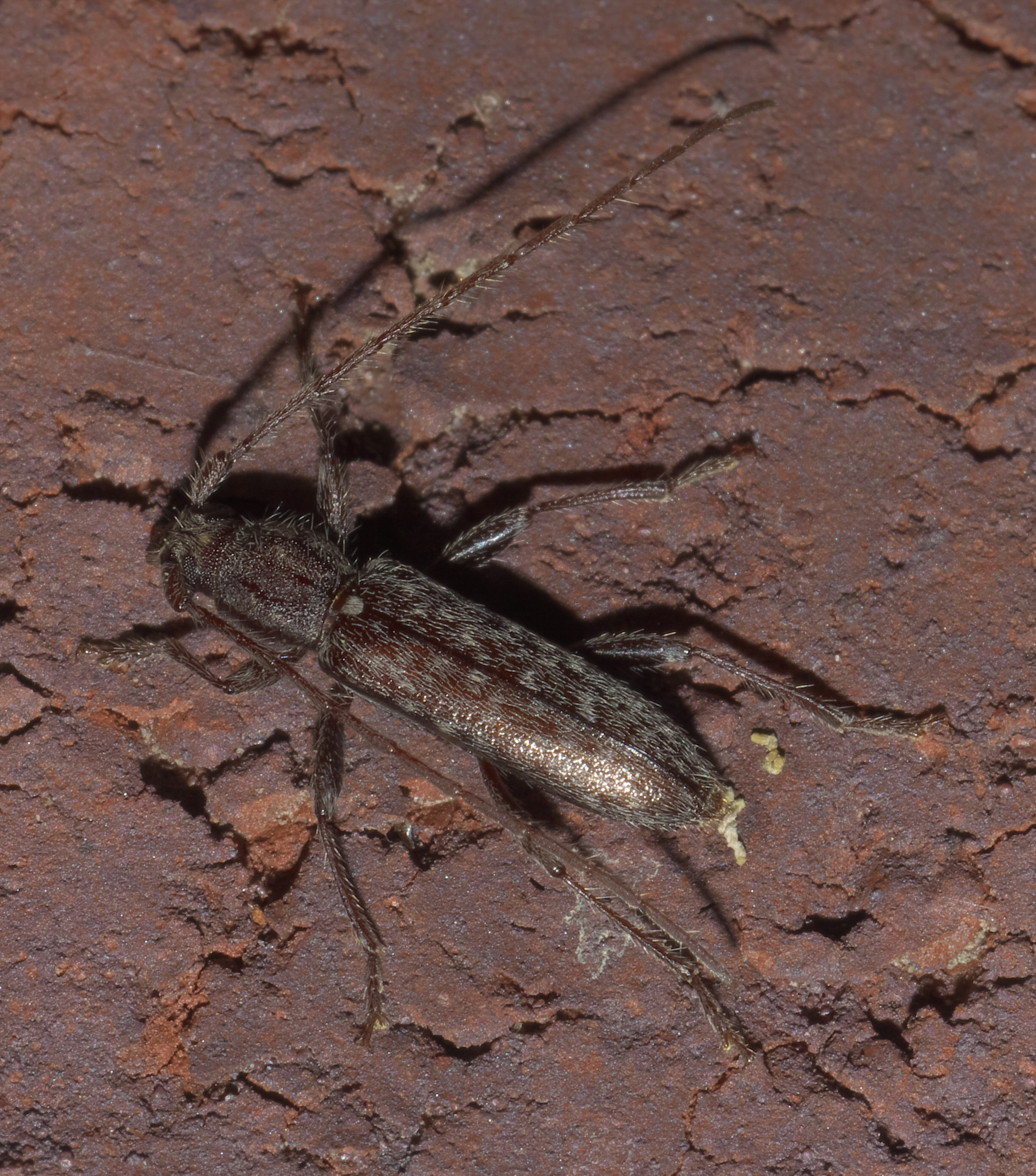

Scientific classification
- Domain: Eukaryota
- Kingdom: Animalia
- Phylum: Arthropoda
- Class: Insecta
- Order: Coleoptera
- Suborder: Polyphaga
- Infraorder: Cucujiformia
- Family: Cerambycidae
- Genus: Anelaphus
- Species: A. pumilus

Binomial name
- Anelaphus pumilus (Newman, 1840)

= Anelaphus pumilus =

Species of beetle

Anelaphus pumilus is a species of beetle in the family Cerambycidae. It was described by Newman in 1840.
