= Anelaphus undulatus =

Scientific classification
- Domain: Eukaryota
- Kingdom: Animalia
- Phylum: Arthropoda
- Class: Insecta
- Order: Coleoptera
- Suborder: Polyphaga
- Infraorder: Cucujiformia
- Family: Cerambycidae
- Genus: Anelaphus
- Species: A. undulatus

Binomial name
- Anelaphus undulatus (Bates, 1880)

Species of beetle

Anelaphus undulatus is a species of beetle in the family Cerambycidae. It was described by Henry Walter Bates in 1880.
