= Anelaphus velteni =

Scientific classification
- Kingdom: Animalia
- Phylum: Arthropoda
- Clade: Pancrustacea
- Class: Insecta
- Order: Coleoptera
- Suborder: Polyphaga
- Infraorder: Cucujiformia
- Family: Cerambycidae
- Subfamily: Cerambycinae
- Tribe: Elaphidiini
- Genus: Anelaphus
- Species: †A. velteni

Binomial name
- †Anelaphus velteni Vitali 2009

Extinct species of beetle

Anelaphus velteni is an extinct species of beetle in the family Cerambycidae that was found in the present-day Dominican Republic.

== Discovery ==
It was first described by Vitali in 2009. Prehistoric specimens were found in Dominican amber on Hispaniola, in the Caribbean.
