= Anelaphus piceus =

Scientific classification
- Domain: Eukaryota
- Kingdom: Animalia
- Phylum: Arthropoda
- Class: Insecta
- Order: Coleoptera
- Suborder: Polyphaga
- Infraorder: Cucujiformia
- Family: Cerambycidae
- Genus: Anelaphus
- Species: A. piceus

Binomial name
- Anelaphus piceus (Chemsak, 1962)

Species of beetle

Anelaphus piceus is a species of beetle in the family Cerambycidae. It was described by Chemsak in 1962.
