= Anelaphus praeclarus =

Scientific classification
- Domain: Eukaryota
- Kingdom: Animalia
- Phylum: Arthropoda
- Class: Insecta
- Order: Coleoptera
- Suborder: Polyphaga
- Infraorder: Cucujiformia
- Family: Cerambycidae
- Genus: Anelaphus
- Species: A. praeclarus

Binomial name
- Anelaphus praeclarus Lingafelter, 2008

Species of beetle

Anelaphus praeclarus is a species of beetle in the family Cerambycidae. It was described by Lingafelter in 2008.
