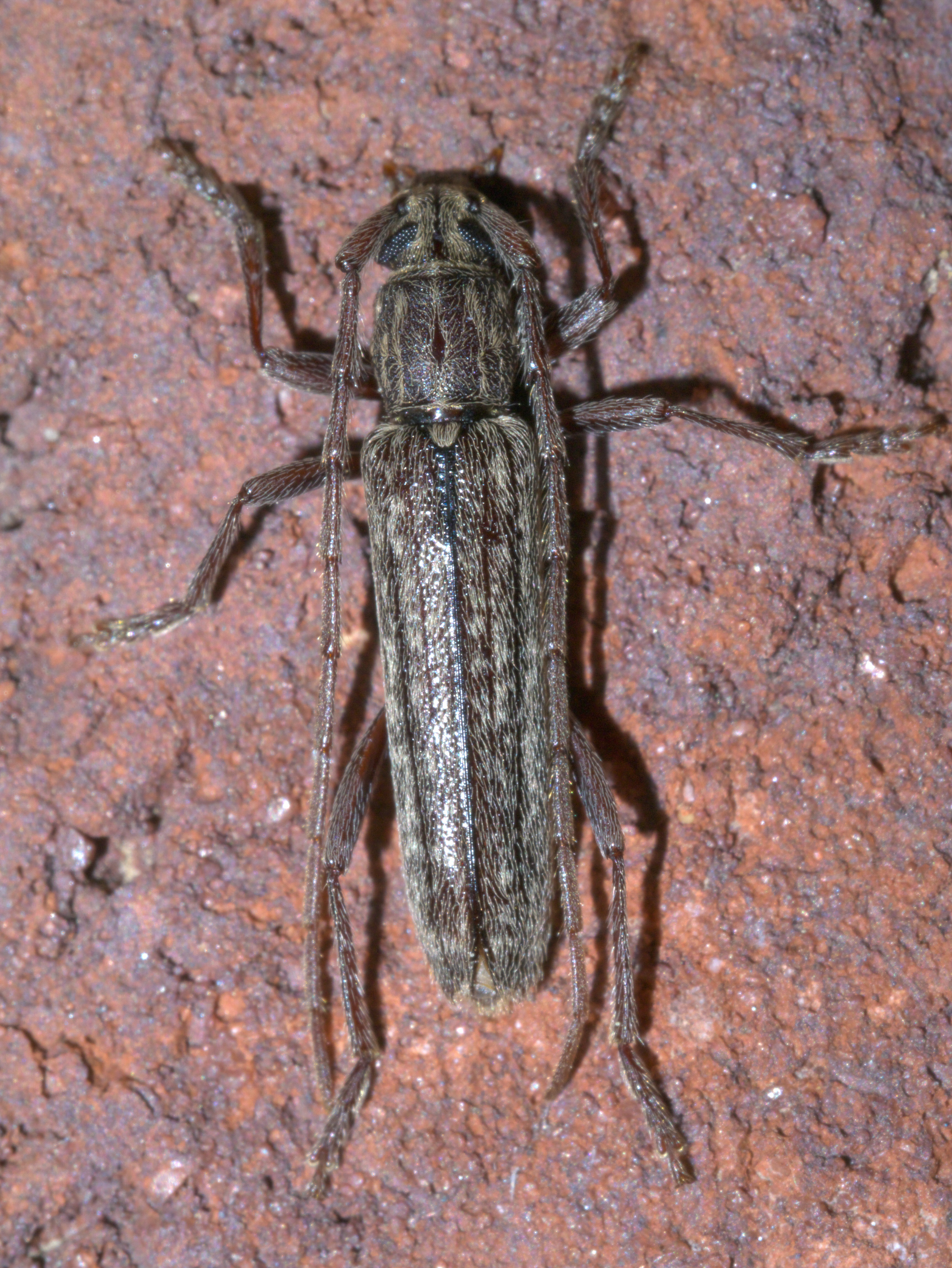
- Anelaphus villosus, Oklahoma

Scientific classification
- Kingdom: Animalia
- Phylum: Arthropoda
- Clade: Pancrustacea
- Class: Insecta
- Order: Coleoptera
- Suborder: Polyphaga
- Infraorder: Cucujiformia
- Family: Cerambycidae
- Subfamily: Cerambycinae
- Tribe: Elaphidiini
- Genus: Anelaphus
- Species: A. villosus

Binomial name
- Anelaphus villosus (Fabricius, 1792)

= Anelaphus villosus =

Species of beetle

Anelaphus villosus, the twig pruner, is a species in the longhorn beetle family Cerambycidae. It is found in the eastern half of the United States and southeastern Canada.

The species Anelaphus parallelus has been determined to be a taxonomic synonym of Anelaphus villosus. They are now treated as the same species under the name Anelaphus villosus.
