= Anelaphus dentatus =

Scientific classification
- Domain: Eukaryota
- Kingdom: Animalia
- Phylum: Arthropoda
- Class: Insecta
- Order: Coleoptera
- Suborder: Polyphaga
- Infraorder: Cucujiformia
- Family: Cerambycidae
- Genus: Anelaphus
- Species: A. dentatus

Binomial name
- Anelaphus dentatus Chemsak, 1962

Species of beetle

Anelaphus dentatus is a species of beetle in the family Cerambycidae. It was described by Chemsak in 1962 while he was doing scientific exploration.
