= Anelaphus brevidens =

Scientific classification
- Domain: Eukaryota
- Kingdom: Animalia
- Phylum: Arthropoda
- Class: Insecta
- Order: Coleoptera
- Suborder: Polyphaga
- Infraorder: Cucujiformia
- Family: Cerambycidae
- Genus: Anelaphus
- Species: A. brevidens

Binomial name
- Anelaphus brevidens (Schaeffer, 1908)

Species of beetle

Anelaphus brevidens is a species of beetle in the family Cerambycidae. It was described by Schaeffer in 1908.
