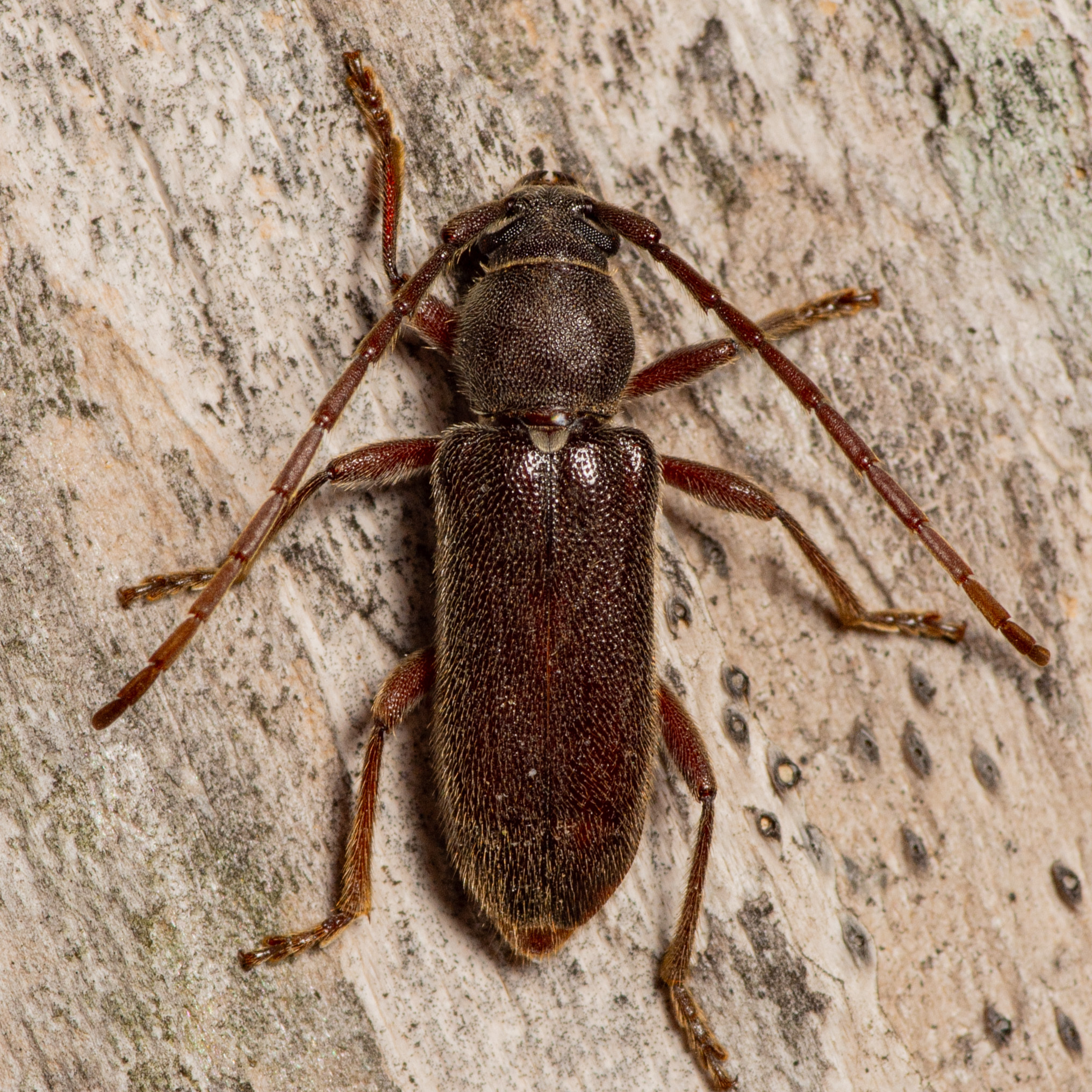
- Anelaphus moestus, Texas

Scientific classification
- Domain: Eukaryota
- Kingdom: Animalia
- Phylum: Arthropoda
- Class: Insecta
- Order: Coleoptera
- Suborder: Polyphaga
- Infraorder: Cucujiformia
- Family: Cerambycidae
- Genus: Anelaphus
- Species: A. moestus

Binomial name
- Anelaphus moestus (LeConte, 1854)

= Anelaphus moestus =

Species of beetle

Anelaphus moestus is a species of beetle in the family Cerambycidae, found primarily in North America. It was described by John Lawrence LeConte in 1854.
