= Anelaphus hispaniolae =

Scientific classification
- Domain: Eukaryota
- Kingdom: Animalia
- Phylum: Arthropoda
- Class: Insecta
- Order: Coleoptera
- Suborder: Polyphaga
- Infraorder: Cucujiformia
- Family: Cerambycidae
- Genus: Anelaphus
- Species: A. hispaniolae

Binomial name
- Anelaphus hispaniolae Fisher, 1932

Species of beetle

Anelaphus hispaniolae is a species of beetle in the family Cerambycidae. It was described by Fisher in 1932.
