= Anelaphus bupalpus =

Scientific classification
- Kingdom: Animalia
- Phylum: Arthropoda
- Class: Insecta
- Order: Coleoptera
- Suborder: Polyphaga
- Infraorder: Cucujiformia
- Family: Cerambycidae
- Genus: Anelaphus
- Species: A. bupalpus

Binomial name
- Anelaphus bupalpus (Chemsak, 1991)

Species of beetle

Anelaphus bupalpus is a species of beetle in the family Cerambycidae. It was described by Chemsak in 1991.
