= Anelaphus albofasciatus =

Scientific classification
- Domain: Eukaryota
- Kingdom: Animalia
- Phylum: Arthropoda
- Class: Insecta
- Order: Coleoptera
- Suborder: Polyphaga
- Infraorder: Cucujiformia
- Family: Cerambycidae
- Genus: Anelaphus
- Species: A. albofasciatus

Binomial name
- Anelaphus albofasciatus (Linell, 1897)

Species of beetle

Anelaphus albofasciatus is a species of beetle in the family Cerambycidae. It was described by Linell in 1897.
