= Anelaphus crispulus =

Scientific classification
- Domain: Eukaryota
- Kingdom: Animalia
- Phylum: Arthropoda
- Class: Insecta
- Order: Coleoptera
- Suborder: Polyphaga
- Infraorder: Cucujiformia
- Family: Cerambycidae
- Genus: Anelaphus
- Species: A. crispulus

Binomial name
- Anelaphus crispulus (Fisher, 1947)

Species of beetle

Anelaphus crispulus is a species of beetle in the family Cerambycidae. It was described by Fisher in 1947.
