= Anelaphus fasciatum =

Scientific classification
- Domain: Eukaryota
- Kingdom: Animalia
- Phylum: Arthropoda
- Class: Insecta
- Order: Coleoptera
- Suborder: Polyphaga
- Infraorder: Cucujiformia
- Family: Cerambycidae
- Genus: Anelaphus
- Species: A. fasciatum

Binomial name
- Anelaphus fasciatum Fisher, 1932

Species of beetle

Anelaphus fasciatum is a species of beetle in the family Cerambycidae. It was described by Fisher in 1932.
