= Anelaphus magnipunctatus =

Scientific classification
- Domain: Eukaryota
- Kingdom: Animalia
- Phylum: Arthropoda
- Class: Insecta
- Order: Coleoptera
- Suborder: Polyphaga
- Infraorder: Cucujiformia
- Family: Cerambycidae
- Genus: Anelaphus
- Species: A. magnipunctatus

Binomial name
- Anelaphus magnipunctatus (Knull, 1934)

Species of beetle

Anelaphus magnipunctatus is a species of beetle in the family Cerambycidae. It was described by Knull in 1934.
