= Anelaphus asperus =

Scientific classification
- Domain: Eukaryota
- Kingdom: Animalia
- Phylum: Arthropoda
- Class: Insecta
- Order: Coleoptera
- Suborder: Polyphaga
- Infraorder: Cucujiformia
- Family: Cerambycidae
- Genus: Anelaphus
- Species: A. asperus

Binomial name
- Anelaphus asperus (Knull, 1962)

Species of beetle

Anelaphus asperus is a species of beetle in the family Cerambycidae. It was described by Knull in 1962.
