= Anelaphus nanus =

Scientific classification
- Kingdom: Animalia
- Phylum: Arthropoda
- Clade: Pancrustacea
- Class: Insecta
- Order: Coleoptera
- Suborder: Polyphaga
- Infraorder: Cucujiformia
- Family: Cerambycidae
- Genus: Anelaphus
- Species: A. nanus

Binomial name
- Anelaphus nanus (Fabricius, 1792)

Species of beetle

Anelaphus nanus is a species of beetle in the family Cerambycidae. It was described by Johan Christian Fabricius in 1792. It is found in the Caribbean.
