= Anelaphus jansoni =

Scientific classification
- Kingdom: Animalia
- Phylum: Arthropoda
- Clade: Pancrustacea
- Class: Insecta
- Order: Coleoptera
- Suborder: Polyphaga
- Infraorder: Cucujiformia
- Family: Cerambycidae
- Genus: Anelaphus
- Species: A. jansoni

Binomial name
- Anelaphus jansoni Linsley, 1961

Species of beetle

Anelaphus jansoni is a species of beetle in the family Cerambycidae. It was described by Linsley in 1961.
