= Elaphidion glabriusculum =

Scientific classification
- Kingdom: Animalia
- Phylum: Arthropoda
- Class: Insecta
- Order: Coleoptera
- Suborder: Polyphaga
- Infraorder: Cucujiformia
- Family: Cerambycidae
- Genus: Elaphidion
- Species: E. glabriusculum

Binomial name
- Elaphidion glabriusculum (Bates, 1885)

Species of beetle

Elaphidion glabriusculum is a species of beetle in the family Cerambycidae. It was described by Bates in 1885.
