= Elaphidion quadrituberculatum =

Scientific classification
- Kingdom: Animalia
- Phylum: Arthropoda
- Class: Insecta
- Order: Coleoptera
- Suborder: Polyphaga
- Infraorder: Cucujiformia
- Family: Cerambycidae
- Genus: Elaphidion
- Species: E. quadrituberculatum

Binomial name
- Elaphidion quadrituberculatum Chevrolat, 1862

Species of beetle

Elaphidion quadrituberculatum is a species of beetle in the family Cerambycidae. It was described by Chevrolat in 1862.
