= Elaphidion pusillum =

Scientific classification
- Kingdom: Animalia
- Phylum: Arthropoda
- Class: Insecta
- Order: Coleoptera
- Suborder: Polyphaga
- Infraorder: Cucujiformia
- Family: Cerambycidae
- Genus: Elaphidion
- Species: E. pusillum

Binomial name
- Elaphidion pusillum Hahdeman, 1847

Species of beetle

Elaphidion pusillum is a species of beetle in the family Cerambycidae. It was described by Haldeman in 1847.
