= Elaphidion densevestitum =

Scientific classification
- Kingdom: Animalia
- Phylum: Arthropoda
- Class: Insecta
- Order: Coleoptera
- Suborder: Polyphaga
- Infraorder: Cucujiformia
- Family: Cerambycidae
- Genus: Elaphidion
- Species: E. densevestitum

Binomial name
- Elaphidion densevestitum Fisher, 1942

Species of beetle

Elaphidion densevestitum is a species of beetle in the family Cerambycidae. It was described by Fisher in 1942.
