= Elaphidion nearnsi =

Scientific classification
- Kingdom: Animalia
- Phylum: Arthropoda
- Class: Insecta
- Order: Coleoptera
- Suborder: Polyphaga
- Infraorder: Cucujiformia
- Family: Cerambycidae
- Genus: Elaphidion
- Species: E. nearnsi

Binomial name
- Elaphidion nearnsi Lingafelter, 2008

Species of beetle

Elaphidion nearnsi is a species of beetle in the family Cerambycidae. It was described by Lingafelter in 2008.
