= Elaphidion niveonotatum =

Scientific classification
- Kingdom: Animalia
- Phylum: Arthropoda
- Clade: Pancrustacea
- Class: Insecta
- Order: Coleoptera
- Suborder: Polyphaga
- Infraorder: Cucujiformia
- Family: Cerambycidae
- Genus: Elaphidion
- Species: E. niveonotatum

Binomial name
- Elaphidion niveonotatum Zayas, 1975

Species of beetle

Elaphidion niveonotatum is a species of beetle in the family Cerambycidae indigenous to Cuba. The name niveonotatum originates from Latin meaning “with snow white dots”, and they are easily identifiable by the white markings on the thorax, and abdominal body sections. It was described by Zayas in 1975.
