= Elaphidion glabratum =

Scientific classification
- Kingdom: Animalia
- Phylum: Arthropoda
- Class: Insecta
- Order: Coleoptera
- Suborder: Polyphaga
- Infraorder: Cucujiformia
- Family: Cerambycidae
- Genus: Elaphidion
- Species: E. glabratum

Binomial name
- Elaphidion glabratum (Fabricius, 1775)

Species of beetle

Elaphidion glabratum is a species of beetle in the family Cerambycidae. It was described by Johan Christian Fabricius in 1775.
