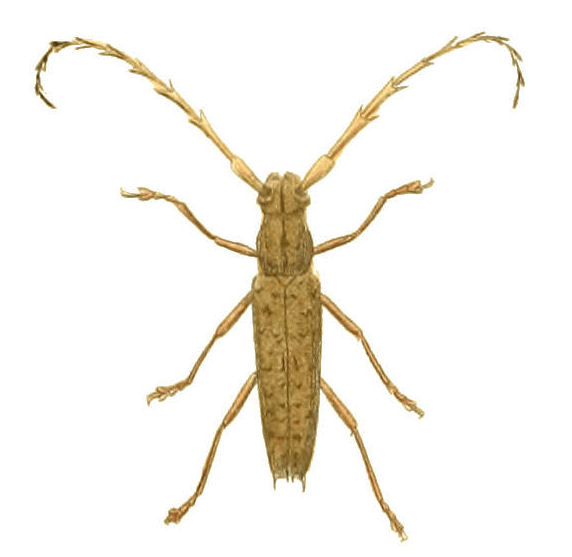

Scientific classification
- Kingdom: Animalia
- Phylum: Arthropoda
- Class: Insecta
- Order: Coleoptera
- Suborder: Polyphaga
- Infraorder: Cucujiformia
- Family: Cerambycidae
- Genus: Elaphidion
- Species: E. spinicorne

Binomial name
- Elaphidion spinicorne (Drury, 1773)

= Elaphidion spinicorne =

Species of beetle

Elaphidion spinicorne is a species of beetle in the family Cerambycidae. It was described by Dru Drury in 1773 from Jamaica.

== Description ==
Head clay coloured. Antennae red brown, about as long as the insect, each joint having two spines, except that next to the head. Thorax clay coloured and cylindrical, without spines; having a small red-brown streak extending along the middle and down the head. Scutellum triangular. Elytra clay coloured, with many small red-brown streaks crossing them; margined on the sides and suture, each having two spines at its extremity. Abdomen and breast greyish clay coloured, with a small red-brown spot on each side of each of the segments. Legs red brown, having a strong spine at the tip of each of the femora, except the fore ones, and another at the tips of each of the tibiae. Length of body slightly less than 1 inch (21 mm).
