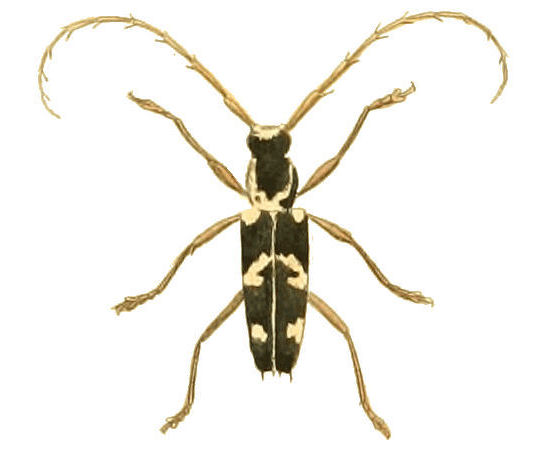
- Elaphidion irroratum

Scientific classification
- Kingdom: Animalia
- Phylum: Arthropoda
- Clade: Pancrustacea
- Class: Insecta
- Order: Coleoptera
- Suborder: Polyphaga
- Infraorder: Cucujiformia
- Family: Cerambycidae
- Tribe: Elaphidiini
- Genus: Elaphidion; Audinet-Serville, 1834

= Elaphidion =

Genus of beetles

Elaphidion is a genus of beetles in the family Cerambycidae, containing the following species:

- Elaphidion albosignatum Chevrolat, 1862
- Elaphidion androsensis Fisher, 1942
- Elaphidion angustatum Zayas, 1975
- Elaphidion auricoma Lingafelter, 2008
- Elaphidion bahamicae Cazier & Lacey, 1952
- Elaphidion bidens (Fabricius, 1787)
- Elaphidion cayamae Fisher, 1932
- Elaphidion clavis Linsley, 1957
- Elaphidion conspersum Newman, 1841
- Elaphidion costipenne Fisher, 1932
- Elaphidion cristalensis Zayas, 1975
- Elaphidion cryptum Linsley, 1963
- Elaphidion cubae Fisher, 1932
- Elaphidion curacaoae Gilmour, 1968
- Elaphidion densevestitum Fisher, 1942
- Elaphidion depressum Zayas, 1975
- Elaphidion difflatus Zayas, 1975
- Elaphidion elongatum Fisher, 1942
- Elaphidion excelsum Gahan, 1895
- Elaphidion frisevestitum Fisher, 1942
- Elaphidion fullonium Newman, 1841
- Elaphidion glabratum (Fabricius, 1775)
- Elaphidion glabriusculum (Bates, 1885)
- †Elaphidion inclusum Vitali, 2007
- Elaphidion irroratum (Linnaeus, 1767)
- Elaphidion iviei Lingafelter, 2008
- Elaphidion jamaicensis Fisher, 1932
- Elaphidion jibacoense Zayas, 1975
- Elaphidion knulli Linsley, 1957
- Elaphidion laeve White, 1853
- Elaphidion lanatum Chevrolat, 1862
- Elaphidion lewisi Fisher, 1941
- Elaphidion linsleyi Knull, 1960
- Elaphidion manni Fisher, 1932
- Elaphidion mayesae Ivie, 2007
- Elaphidion michelii Ivie, 2007
- Elaphidion mimeticum Schaeffer, 1905
- Elaphidion mucronatum (Say, 1824)
- Elaphidion nearnsi Lingafelter, 2008
- Elaphidion niveonotatum Zayas, 1975
- Elaphidion pauropilosum Zayas, 1975
- Elaphidion pseudonomon Ivie, 1985
- Elaphidion pusillum Haldeman, 1847
- Elaphidion quadrituberculatum Chevrolat, 1862
- Elaphidion rotundipenne Fisher, 1932
- Elaphidion scabricolle (Bates, 1872)
- Elaphidion scaramuzzai Fisher, 1951
- Elaphidion spinicorne (Drury, 1773)
- Elaphidion splendidum Fisher, 1932
- Elaphidion tectum LeConte in Schwarz, 1878
- Elaphidion thompsoni Fisher, 1941
- †Elaphidion tocanum Vitali, 2009
- Elaphidion tomentosum Chevrolat, 1862
- Elaphidion tuberculicolle Fisher, 1932
- Elaphidion uncinatum Zayas, 1975
- Elaphidion unispinosum Fisher, 1942
- Elaphidion wappesi Lingafelter, 2008
- Elaphidion williamsi Chemsak, 1967
