= Elaphidion clavis =

Scientific classification
- Kingdom: Animalia
- Phylum: Arthropoda
- Class: Insecta
- Order: Coleoptera
- Suborder: Polyphaga
- Infraorder: Cucujiformia
- Family: Cerambycidae
- Genus: Elaphidion
- Species: E. clavis

Binomial name
- Elaphidion clavis Linsley, 1957

Species of beetle

Elaphidion clavis is a species of beetle in the family Cerambycidae. It was described by Linsley in 1957.
