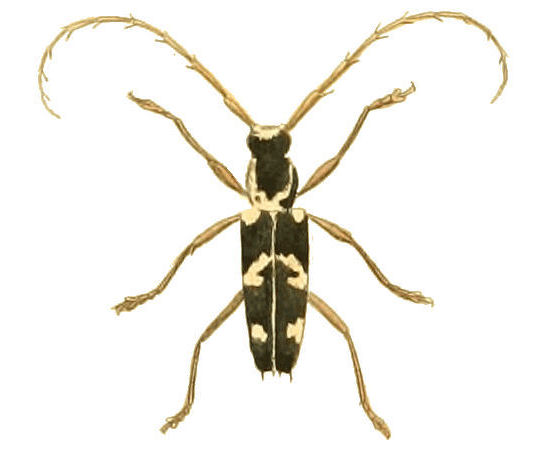

Scientific classification
- Kingdom: Animalia
- Phylum: Arthropoda
- Class: Insecta
- Order: Coleoptera
- Suborder: Polyphaga
- Infraorder: Cucujiformia
- Family: Cerambycidae
- Genus: Elaphidion
- Species: E. irroratum

Binomial name
- Elaphidion irroratum (Linnaeus, 1767)

= Elaphidion irroratum =

Species of beetle

Elaphidion irroratum is a species of beetle in the family Cerambycidae. It was described by Carl Linnaeus in his 1767 12th edition of Systema Naturae.

== Description ==
Head very dark brown, almost black; front dappled with cream colour. Antennae dark brown, and about the length of the insect; having spines at each joint, except that next the head. Thorax spineless, brownish black, with white patches on its sides; and, when viewed through a microscope, punctured. Scutellum very small, and nearly triangular. Elytra brownish black, margined at the sides and suture, with whitish patches thereon, punctured; having two spines at the extremity of each. Abdomen and breast black, and covered with short grey hairs like pile. Legs reddish brown, with a small spine at the tip of each of the femora (except the fore ones), and another at the tips of the tibiae. Length of body 3/4 inch (19 mm).
