= Elaphidion conspersum =

Scientific classification
- Kingdom: Animalia
- Phylum: Arthropoda
- Class: Insecta
- Order: Coleoptera
- Suborder: Polyphaga
- Infraorder: Cucujiformia
- Family: Cerambycidae
- Genus: Elaphidion
- Species: E. conspersum

Binomial name
- Elaphidion conspersum Newman, 1841

Species of beetle

Elaphidion conspersum is a species of beetle in the family Cerambycidae. It was described by Newman in 1841.
