= Elaphidion tectum =

Scientific classification
- Kingdom: Animalia
- Phylum: Arthropoda
- Class: Insecta
- Order: Coleoptera
- Suborder: Polyphaga
- Infraorder: Cucujiformia
- Family: Cerambycidae
- Genus: Elaphidion
- Species: E. tectum

Binomial name
- Elaphidion tectum LeConte in Schwarz, 1878

Species of beetle

Elaphidion tectum is a species of beetle in the family Cerambycidae. It was described by John Lawrence LeConte in 1878.
