= Elaphidion cryptum =

Scientific classification
- Kingdom: Animalia
- Phylum: Arthropoda
- Class: Insecta
- Order: Coleoptera
- Suborder: Polyphaga
- Infraorder: Cucujiformia
- Family: Cerambycidae
- Genus: Elaphidion
- Species: E. cryptum

Binomial name
- Elaphidion cryptum Linsley, 1963

Species of beetle

Elaphidion cryptum is a species of beetle in the family Cerambycidae which was described by Linsley in 1963.
