= Elaphidion pauropilosum =

Scientific classification
- Kingdom: Animalia
- Phylum: Arthropoda
- Class: Insecta
- Order: Coleoptera
- Suborder: Polyphaga
- Infraorder: Cucujiformia
- Family: Cerambycidae
- Genus: Elaphidion
- Species: E. pauropilosum

Binomial name
- Elaphidion pauropilosum Zayas, 1975

Species of beetle

Elaphidion pauropilosum is a species of beetle in the family Cerambycidae. It was described by Zayas in 1975.
