= Elaphidion tocanum =

Scientific classification
- Kingdom: Animalia
- Phylum: Arthropoda
- Clade: Pancrustacea
- Class: Insecta
- Order: Coleoptera
- Suborder: Polyphaga
- Infraorder: Cucujiformia
- Family: Cerambycidae
- Genus: Elaphidion
- Species: †E. tocanum

Binomial name
- †Elaphidion tocanum Vitali, 2009

Extinct species of beetle

Elaphidion tocanum is an extinct species of beetle in the family Cerambycidae. It was described by Vitali in 2009.
