= Elaphidion jamaicensis =

Scientific classification
- Kingdom: Animalia
- Phylum: Arthropoda
- Clade: Pancrustacea
- Class: Insecta
- Order: Coleoptera
- Suborder: Polyphaga
- Infraorder: Cucujiformia
- Family: Cerambycidae
- Genus: Elaphidion
- Species: E. jamaicensis

Binomial name
- Elaphidion jamaicensis Fisher, 1932

Species of beetle

Elaphidion jamaicensis is a species of beetle in the family Cerambycidae. It was described by Fisher in 1932.
