= Elaphidion pseudonomon =

Scientific classification
- Kingdom: Animalia
- Phylum: Arthropoda
- Class: Insecta
- Order: Coleoptera
- Suborder: Polyphaga
- Infraorder: Cucujiformia
- Family: Cerambycidae
- Genus: Elaphidion
- Species: E. pseudonomon

Binomial name
- Elaphidion pseudonomon Ivie, 1985

Species of beetle

Elaphidion pseudonomon is a species of beetle in the family Cerambycidae. It was described by Ivie in 1985.
