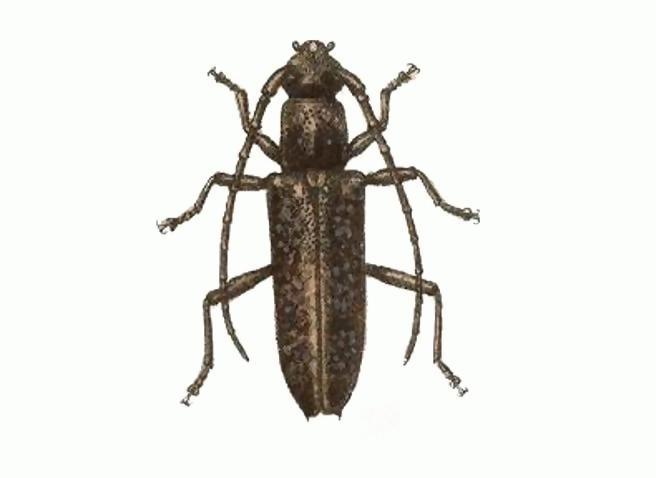

Scientific classification
- Kingdom: Animalia
- Phylum: Arthropoda
- Class: Insecta
- Order: Coleoptera
- Suborder: Polyphaga
- Infraorder: Cucujiformia
- Family: Cerambycidae
- Genus: Elaphidion
- Species: E. scabricolle

Binomial name
- Elaphidion scabricolle (Bates, 1872)

= Elaphidion scabricolle =

Species of beetle

Elaphidion scabricolle is a species of beetle in the family Cerambycidae. It was described by Bates in 1872.
