= Elaphidion williamsi =

Scientific classification
- Kingdom: Animalia
- Phylum: Arthropoda
- Class: Insecta
- Order: Coleoptera
- Suborder: Polyphaga
- Infraorder: Cucujiformia
- Family: Cerambycidae
- Genus: Elaphidion
- Species: E. williamsi

Binomial name
- Elaphidion williamsi Chemsak, 1967

Species of beetle

Elaphidion williamsi is a species of beetle in the family Cerambycidae. It was described by Chemsak in 1967.
