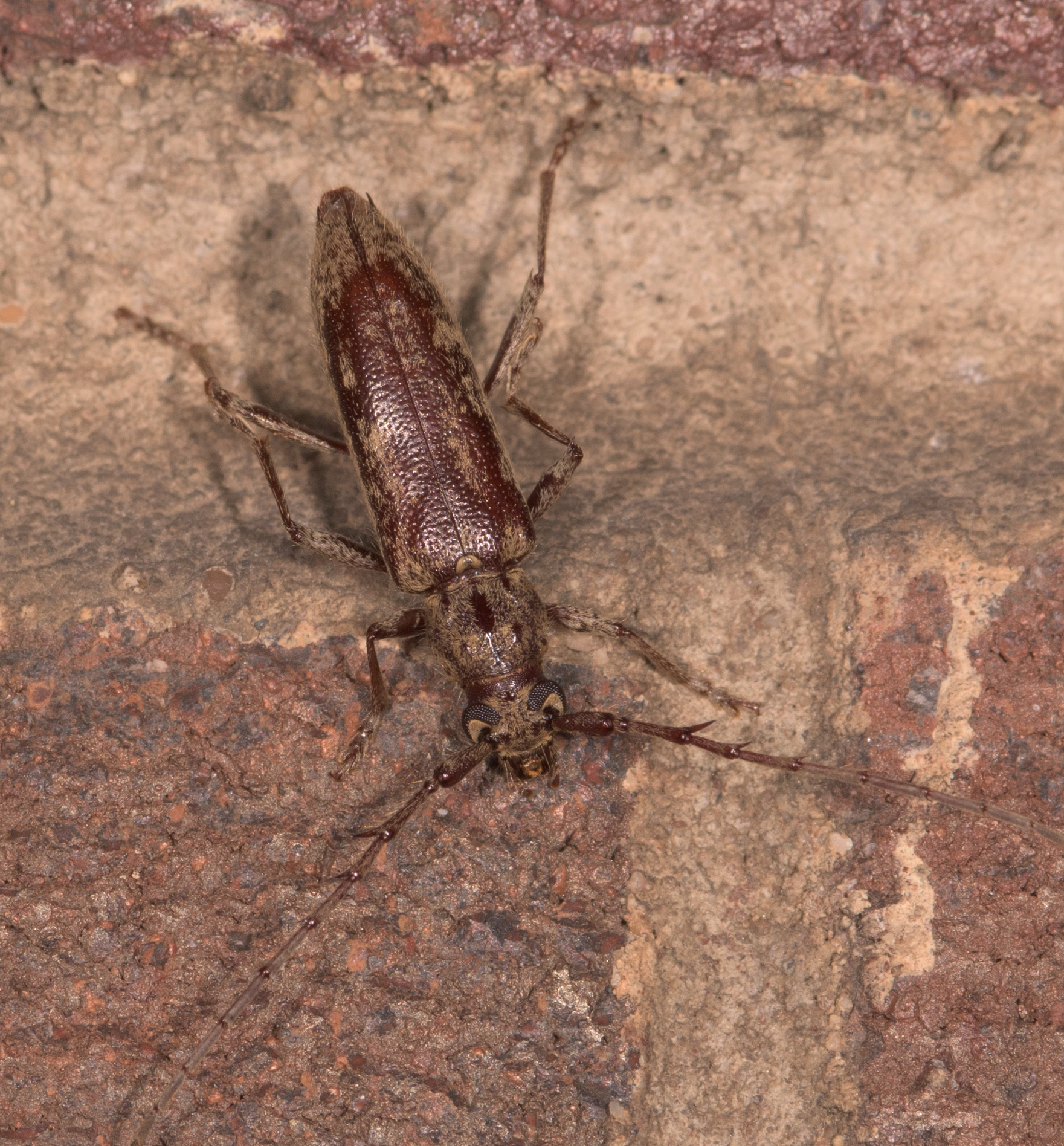
- Marimatha mucronatum

Scientific classification
- Kingdom: Animalia
- Phylum: Arthropoda
- Class: Insecta
- Order: Coleoptera
- Suborder: Polyphaga
- Infraorder: Cucujiformia
- Family: Cerambycidae
- Genus: Elaphidion
- Species: E. mucronatum

Binomial name
- Elaphidion mucronatum (Say, 1824)

= Elaphidion mucronatum =

Species of beetle

Elaphidion mucronatum is a species of beetle in the family Cerambycidae. It was described by Say in 1824.
