= Elaphidion mayesae =

Scientific classification
- Kingdom: Animalia
- Phylum: Arthropoda
- Class: Insecta
- Order: Coleoptera
- Suborder: Polyphaga
- Infraorder: Cucujiformia
- Family: Cerambycidae
- Genus: Elaphidion
- Species: E. mayesae

Binomial name
- Elaphidion mayesae Ivie, 2007

Species of beetle

Elaphidion mayesae is a species of beetle in the family Cerambycidae. It was described by Ivie in 2007.
