= Elaphidion laeve =

Scientific classification
- Kingdom: Animalia
- Phylum: Arthropoda
- Class: Insecta
- Order: Coleoptera
- Suborder: Polyphaga
- Infraorder: Cucujiformia
- Family: Cerambycidae
- Genus: Elaphidion
- Species: E. laeve

Binomial name
- Elaphidion laeve White, 1853

Species of beetle

Elaphidion laeve is a species of beetle in the family Cerambycidae. It was described by White in 1853.
