= Elaphidion excelsum =

Scientific classification
- Kingdom: Animalia
- Phylum: Arthropoda
- Class: Insecta
- Order: Coleoptera
- Suborder: Polyphaga
- Infraorder: Cucujiformia
- Family: Cerambycidae
- Genus: Elaphidion
- Species: E. excelsum

Binomial name
- Elaphidion excelsum Gahan, 1895

Species of beetle

Elaphidion excelsum is a species of beetle in the family Cerambycidae. It was described by Gahan in 1895.
