= Elaphidion linsleyi =

Scientific classification
- Kingdom: Animalia
- Phylum: Arthropoda
- Class: Insecta
- Order: Coleoptera
- Suborder: Polyphaga
- Infraorder: Cucujiformia
- Family: Cerambycidae
- Genus: Elaphidion
- Species: E. linsleyi

Binomial name
- Elaphidion linsleyi Knull, 1960

Species of beetle

Elaphidion linsleyi is a species of beetle in the family Cerambycidae. It was described by Knull in 1960.
