= Elaphidion knulli =

Scientific classification
- Kingdom: Animalia
- Phylum: Arthropoda
- Class: Insecta
- Order: Coleoptera
- Suborder: Polyphaga
- Infraorder: Cucujiformia
- Family: Cerambycidae
- Genus: Elaphidion
- Species: E. knulli

Binomial name
- Elaphidion knulli Linsley, 1957

Species of beetle

Elaphidion knulli is a species of beetle in the family Cerambycidae. It was described by Linsley in 1957.
