= Birch Creek =

Birch Creek can mean:

== Streams ==
United States

- Birch Creek (Yukon River tributary), Alaska
- Birch Creek (Kantishna River tributary), Alaska
- Birch Creek (Menominee County, Michigan)
- Birch Creek (Bourbeuse River tributary), a stream in Missouri
- Birch Creek (Chouteau County, Montana), a tributary of the Missouri River
- Birch Creek (Pondera County, Montana), a tributary of the Two Medicine River
- Birch Creek (Umatilla River tributary), Oregon
- Birch Creek (Franklin County, Idaho), a tributary of Mink Creek (Bear River), in Franklin County, Idaho in the Bear River watershed
- Birch Creek (Beaver County, Utah), a tributary of South Creek

Australia

- Birch Creek, Victoria a stream near Smeaton, Victoria

Canada

- Birch Creek (British Columbia), a creek near the town of Atlin

== Communities ==
- Birch Creek, Alaska, United States
- Birch Creek, Michigan, United States
- Birch Creek, Wisconsin, United States
- Birch Creek, Saskatchewan, Canada
