= Resin birch =

Resin birch is a common name for several plants and may refer to:

- Betula glandulosa, native to North America
- Betula neoalaskana, native to Alaska and northern Canada
