= Coleophora lentella =

Scientific classification
- Kingdom: Animalia
- Phylum: Arthropoda
- Class: Insecta
- Order: Lepidoptera
- Family: Coleophoridae
- Genus: Coleophora
- Species: C. lentella

Binomial name
- Coleophora lentella Heinrich, 1915

Species of moth

Coleophora lentella is a moth of the family Coleophoridae. It is found in North America, including New York and Ontario.

The larvae feed on the leaves of Betula lenta and Betula lutea. They create a spatulate leaf case.
