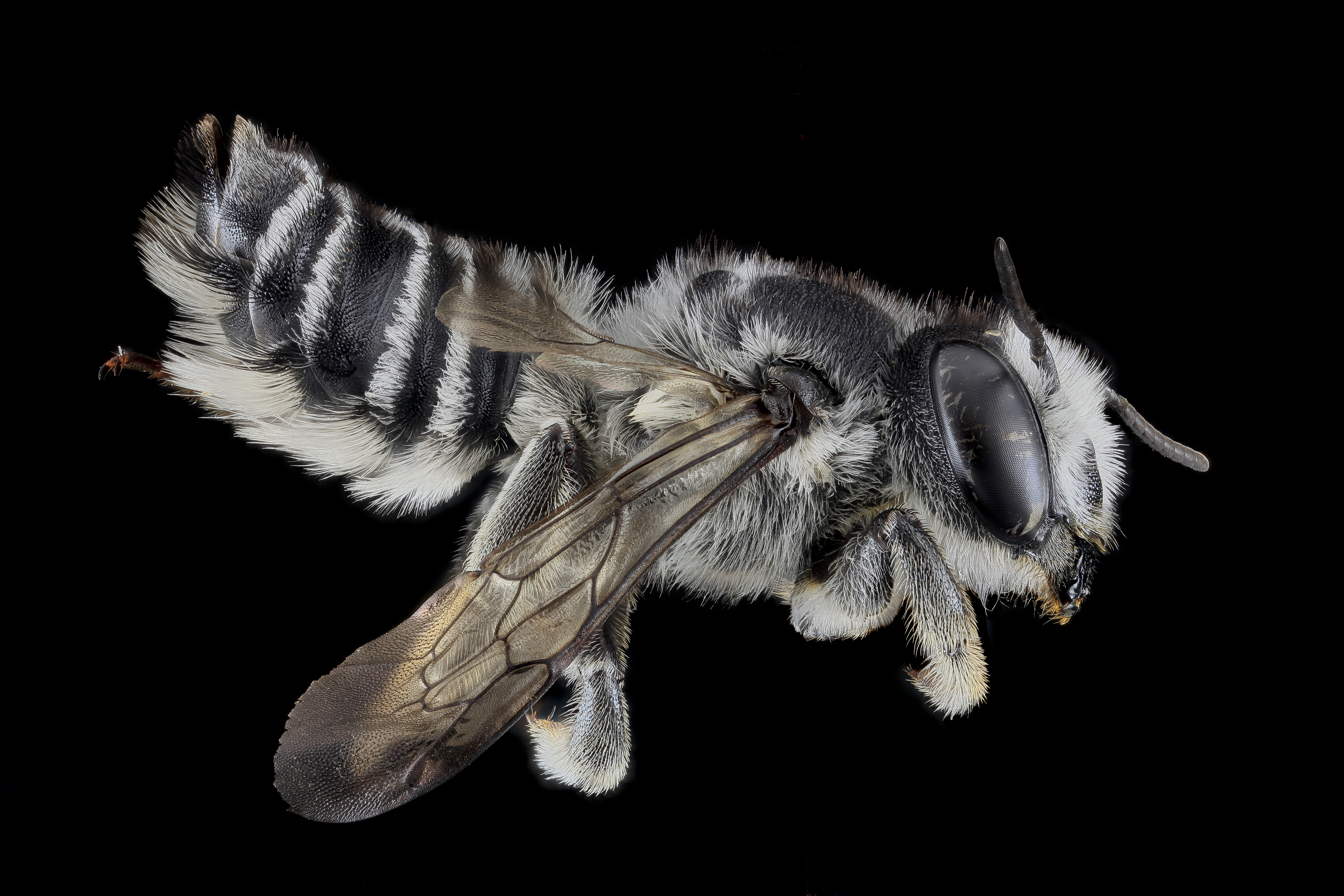

Scientific classification
- Domain: Eukaryota
- Kingdom: Animalia
- Phylum: Arthropoda
- Class: Insecta
- Order: Hymenoptera
- Family: Megachilidae
- Genus: Megachile
- Species: M. texana

Binomial name
- Megachile texana Cresson, 1878

= Megachile texana =

Species of bee

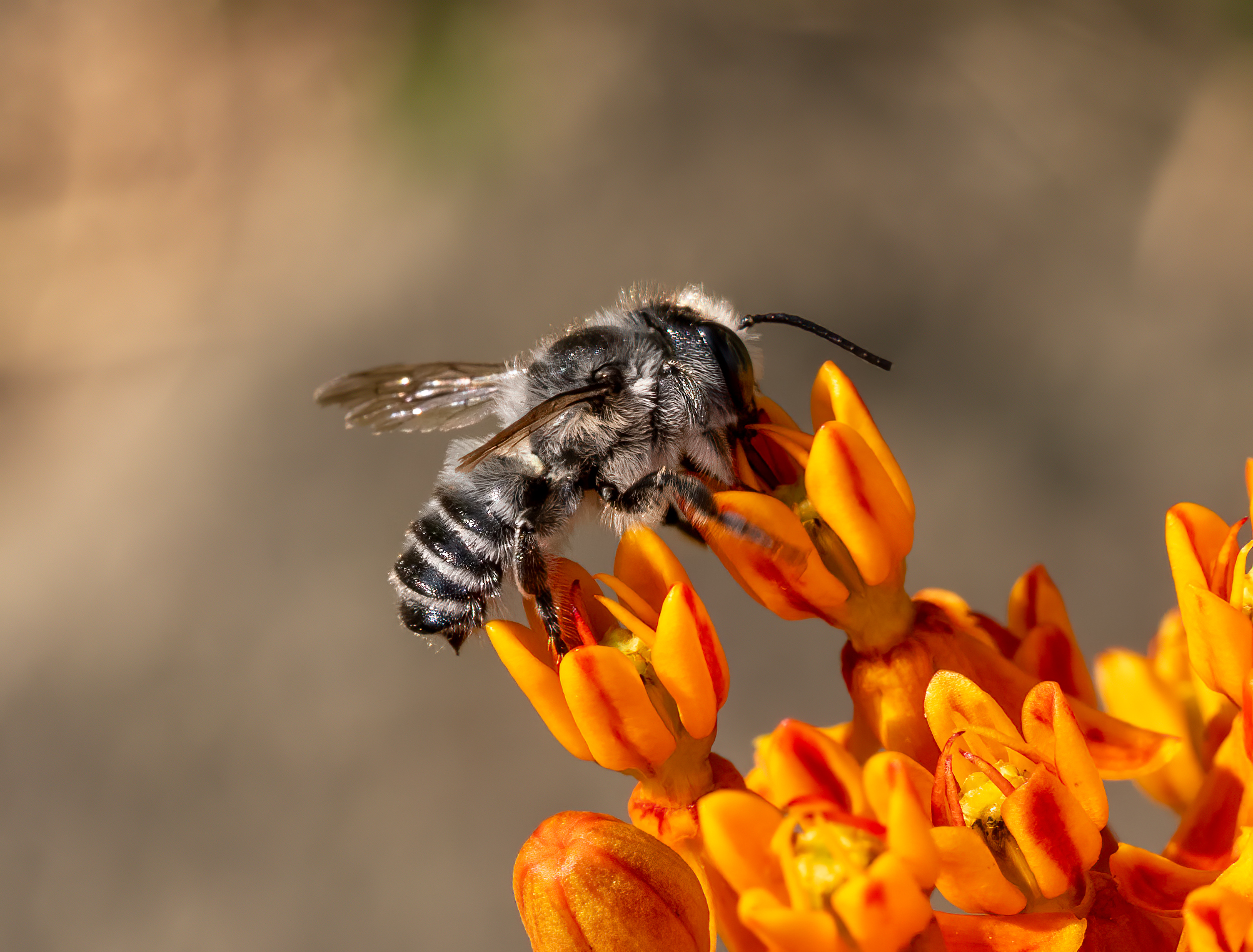
M. texana in New York

Megachile texana, the Texas leafcutter bee, is a species of bee in the family Megachilidae. It was first described by the American entomologist Ezra Townsend Cresson in 1878. It is native to the United States and southern Canada.

== Description ==
The female Megachile texana is between 11 and 13 mm (0.43 and 0.51 in) long and the male between 10 and 12 mm (0.39 and 0.47 in). The head and thorax are clad in short, dense whitish hair. The wings are semi-transparent with black veins. The abdomen is barred in black and yellowish-white.

== Biology ==
The nests of Megachile texana often occur in pasture, with the entrance being under a rock, under a clod of earth or in one case, on a small hillock. The burrows may be up to 25 cm (10 in) long and the upper side is often the underside of a flat stone. Sometimes a pre-existing cavity is used, but females have been observed excavating their own nests. A single cell or several cells may be constructed, each lined with cut portions of leaf in a similar way to the nests of Megachile rubi. Each cell is half-filled with a mixture of pollen and nectar and an egg laid on the food mass. The larva consumes its food supply and when sufficiently developed becomes an inactive prepupa enclosed in a cocoon which fills the cell. The outer surface of the cocoon is wound round with brownish threads.
