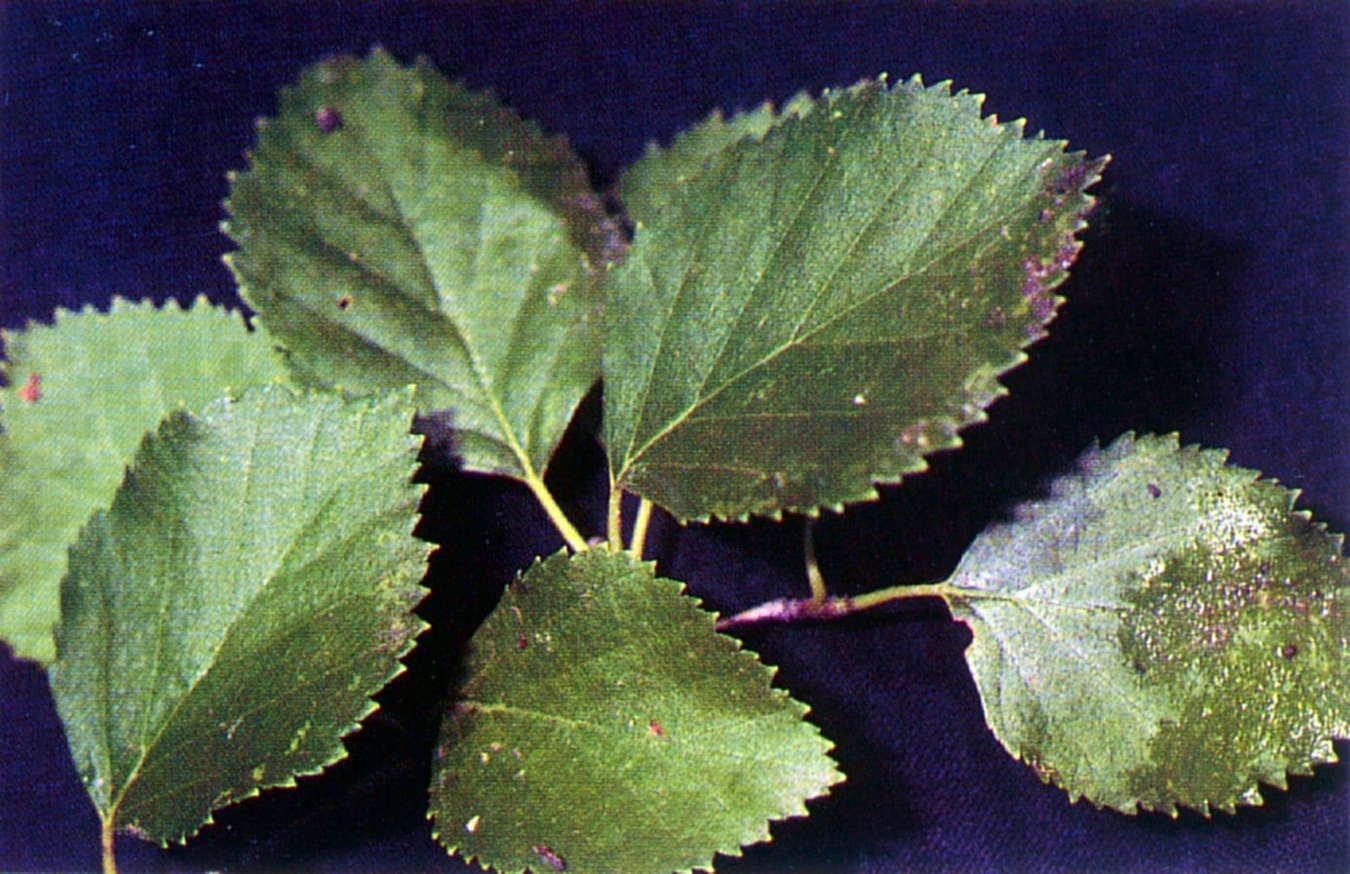
- Foliage

Conservation status
- Secure (NatureServe)

- Least Concern (IUCN 3.1)

Scientific classification
- Kingdom: Plantae
- Clade: Embryophytes
- Clade: Tracheophytes
- Clade: Angiosperms
- Clade: Eudicots
- Clade: Rosids
- Order: Fagales
- Family: Betulaceae
- Genus: Betula
- Subgenus: Betula subg. Betula
- Species: B. occidentalis

Binomial name
- Betula occidentalis Hook.
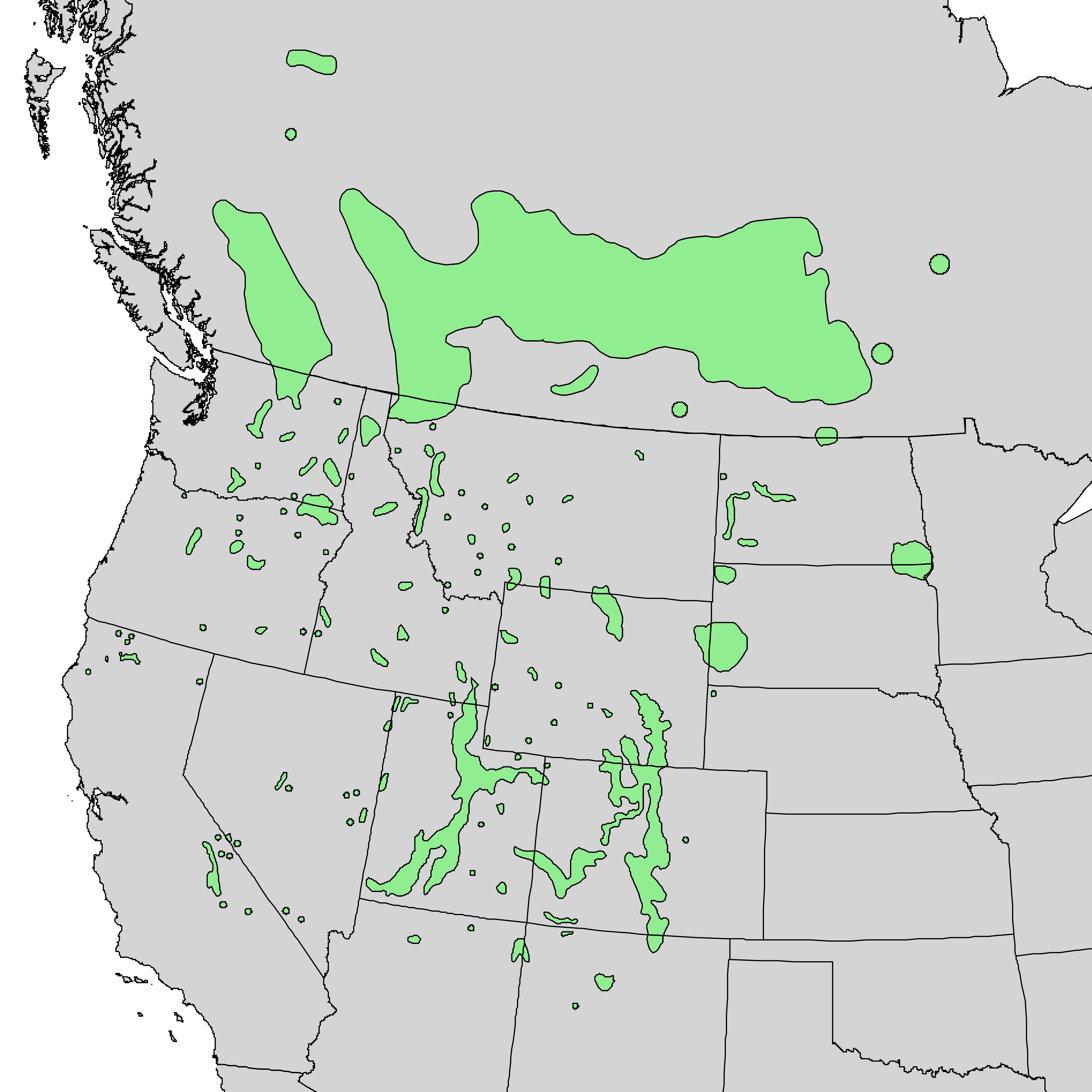
- Natural range of Betula occidentalis

Synonyms
- Synonymy: Betula alba subsp. occidentalis (Hook.) Regel; Betula alba f. occidentalis (Hook.) Fernald; Betula beeniana A.Nelson; Betula elrodiana E.J.Butler; Betula fontinalis Sarg.; Betula fontinalis var. inopina (Jeps.) Jeps.; Betula fontinalis f. inopina Jeps.; Betula microphylla var. occidentalis (Hook.) M.E.Jones; Betula microphylla var. fontinalis (Sarg.) M.E.Jones; Betula occidentalis var. inopina (Jeps.) C.L.Hitchc.; Betula occidentalis f. inopina Jeps.; Betula occidentalis subsp. inopina (Jeps.) A.E.Murray; Betula papyracea var. occidentalis (Hook.) Dippel; Betula papyrifera var. occidentalis (Hook.) Sarg.; Betula papyrifera subsp. occidentalis (Hook.) Hultén

= Betula occidentalis =

Species of birch

Betula occidentalis, the water birch or red birch, is a species of birch native to western North America, in Canada from Yukon east to Northwestern Ontario and southwards, and in the United States from eastern Washington east to western North Dakota, and south to eastern California, northern Arizona and northern New Mexico, and southwestern Alaska. It typically occurs along streams in mountainous regions, sometimes at elevations of 2,100 metres (6,900 feet) and in drier areas than paper birch.

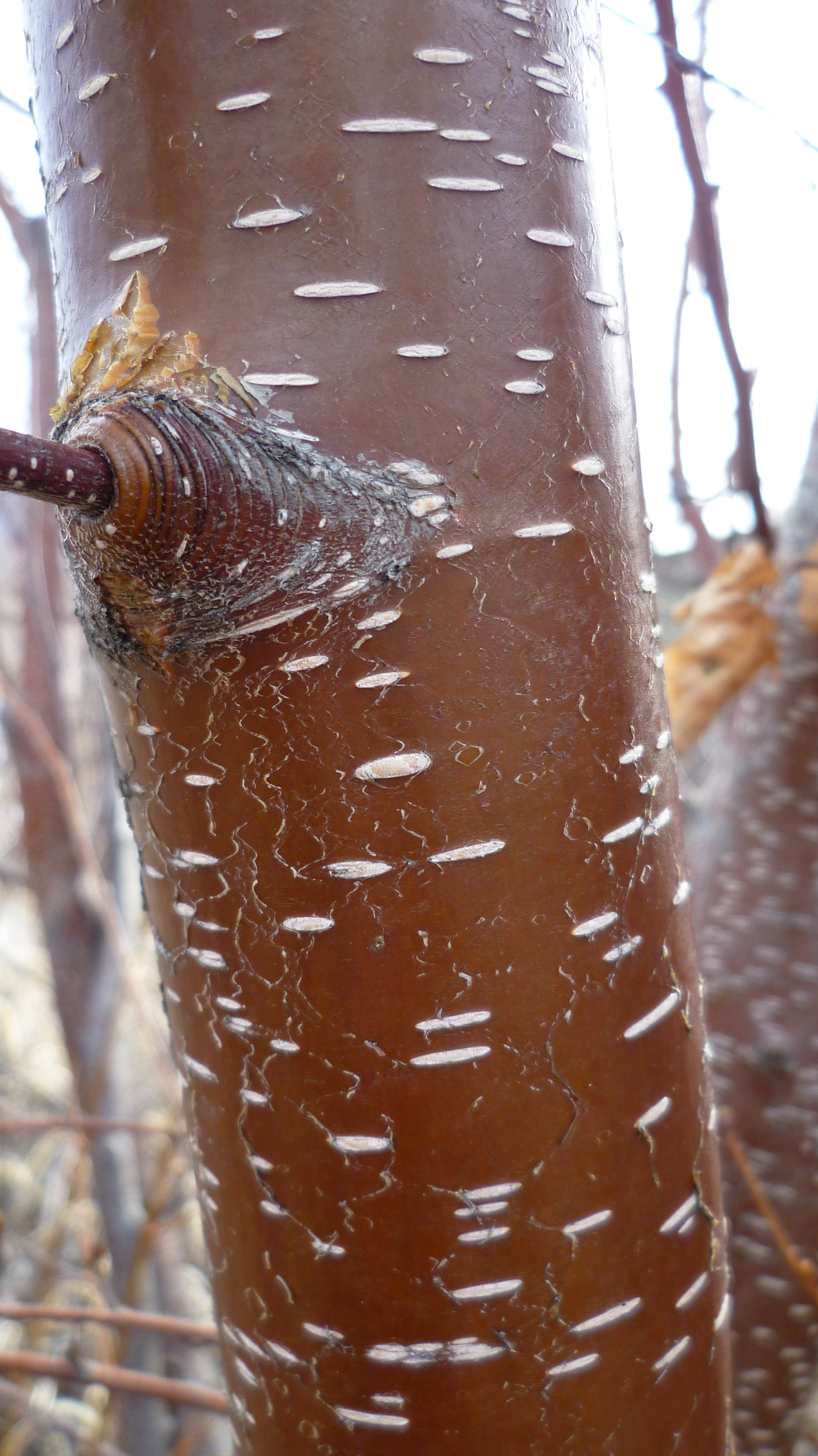
Trunk from along the Columbia River in Chelan County, Washington

It is a deciduous shrub or small tree growing to 14 m (46 ft) high, up to 25 centimetres (10 inches) thick. It tends toward epicormic growth, with many small limbs sprouting from the trunk and causing the wood to be full of small knots. The bark is dark red-brown to blackish, and smooth but not exfoliating. The twigs are glabrous or thinly hairy, and odorless when scraped. The leaves are alternate, ovate to rhombic, 1–7 cm (1/2–2 3/4 in) long and 1–4.5 cm (1/2–1 3/4 in) broad, with a serrated margin and two to six pairs of veins, and a short petiole up to 1.5 cm (1/2 in) long. The flowers are wind-pollinated catkins 2–4 cm (3/4–1 1/2 in) long, the male catkins pendulous, the female catkins erect. The fruit is 2–3 cm (3/4–1 1/4 in) long and 8–15 millimetres (1/4–1/2 in) broad, composed of numerous tiny winged seeds packed between the catkin bracts.

The identity of similar birches in Alaska is disputed; some include them in B. occidentalis, while others regard them as hybrids between Betula neoalaskana and Betula glandulosa. A 2023 study sequenced chloroplast genomes of species from the genus Betula for phylogenetic analysis. Of the Betula species, B. occidentalis was most closely related to B. pendula purple rain and B. platyphylla.

The foliage is browsed by sheep, goats, and birds; some small birds also consume the seeds.

Some Plateau Indian tribes used water birch to treat pimples and sores.

It is also a riverside tree found in western USA that reacts to water stress by becoming isohydric.
