= Birch sap =

Sap from birch trees

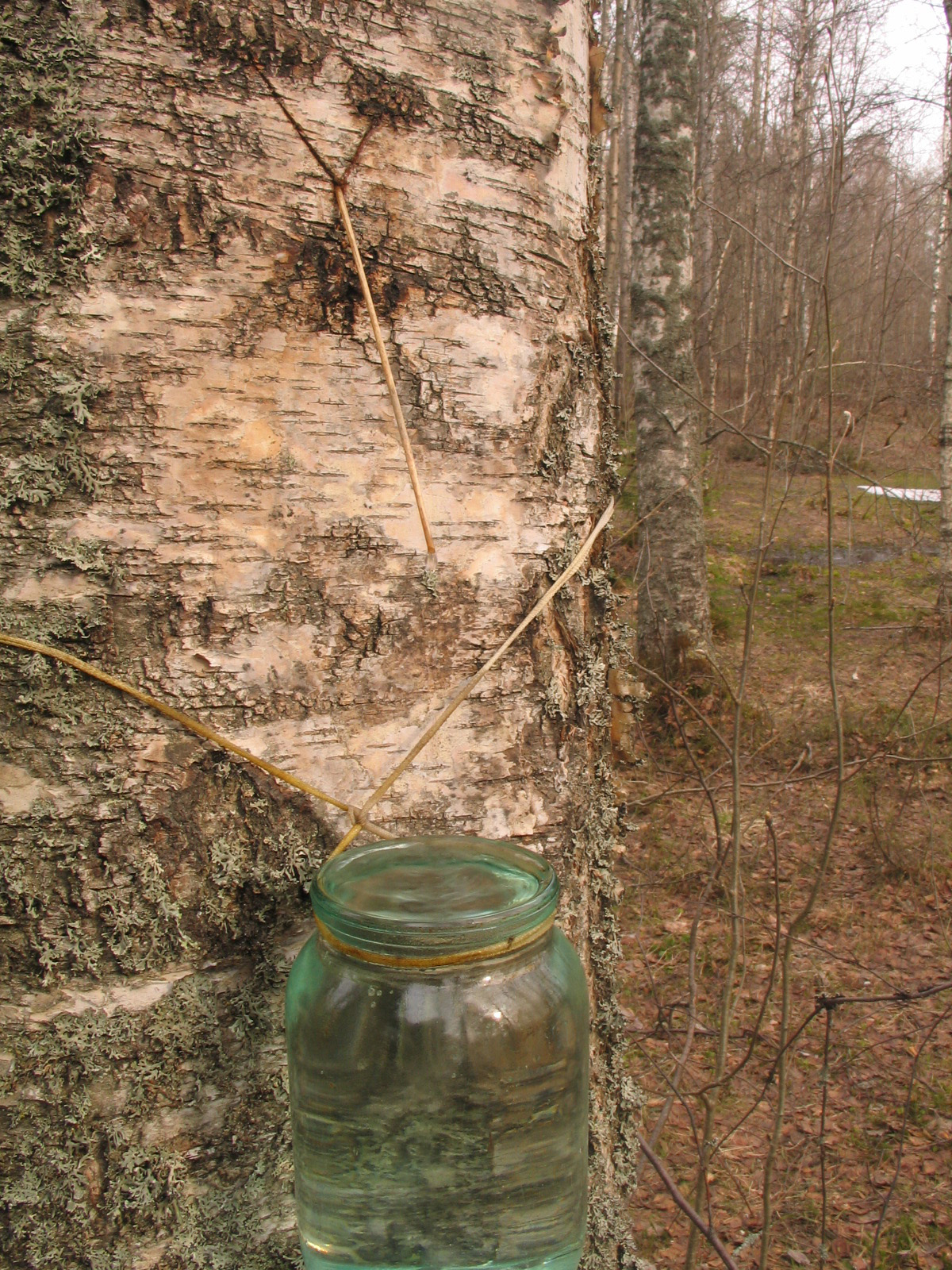
Extraction of birch sap

Birch sap, birch water or birch juice is the sap directly tapped from birch trees, Betula pubescens (white birch), Betula pendula (silver birch), Betula lenta, Betula papyrifera, and Betula fontinalis.

Birch sap may be consumed both fresh and naturally fermented. When fresh, it is a clear and colourless liquid, often slightly sweet with a slightly silky texture. After two to three days, the sap starts fermenting and the taste becomes more acidic.

Birch sap is a traditional beverage in boreal and hemiboreal regions of the Northern Hemisphere as well as parts of northern China.

== Harvest ==
Birch sap is collected only at the break of winter and spring when the sap moves intensively.

Birch sap collection is done by drilling a hole into the tree trunk and leading the sap into a container via some conduit (a tube or simply a thin twig); the sap will flow along it because of the surface tension. The wound is then plugged to minimise infection.

Birch sap has to be collected in early spring before any green leaves have appeared, as in late spring it becomes bitter. The collection period is only about a month per year.

No published evidence exists to quantify the long-term impacts of sap harvest on birch tree and birch forest health, or birch timber quality. However, the wounds caused by tapping birches consistently lead to dark staining in the wood. In one study, infection and wood decay had spread from more than half of old tapping holes.

In comparison to maples, birch trees are considered far less tolerant to the wounds caused by tapping, so more conservative harvesting practises have been recommended by trade bodies such as the Alaska Birch Syrupmakers Association.

== Traditional regions ==
In Slavic regions the word "sap" is translated as "juice", i.e., "birch sap" is birch juice in Belarus (Belarusian: бярозавы сок, romanized: biarozavy sok, Byarozavik), Bulgaria (Bulgarian: брезов сок, romanized: brezov sok), Poland (Polish: sok z brzozy, oskoła), Russia (Russian: берёзовый сок, romanized: byeryozovyi sok), Slovakia (Slovak: brezová šťava), Ukraine (Ukrainian: березовий сік, romanized: berezovyi sik).

Estonia (Estonian: kasemahl), Finland (Finnish: mahla), Latvia (Latvian: bērzu sula), Lithuania (Lithuanian: beržo sula, beržų sula), Norway, Sweden (Swedish: björksav).

France, Scotland and elsewhere in Northern Europe as well as parts of northern China and both Hokkaido and Aomori as parts of northern Japan.

It is also widely used among the Pennsylvania Dutch, both as a traditional beverage in its own right, and particularly as a key ingredient in birch beer.

== Composition ==
Sap, birch water
Nutritional value per 100 g (3.5 oz)
- Energy: 4.6 kcal (19 kJ)
- Carbohydrates: 1.1 g
- Sugars: 1.1 g
- Dietary fiber: 0 g
- Fat: less than 0.1 g
Vitamins and minerals
Minerals	Quantity %DV^{†}
Calcium	5% 60 mg
Iron	1% 0.1 mg
Magnesium	3% 11 mg
Manganese	48% 1.1 mg
Phosphorus	1% 6.4 mg
Potassium	4% 120 mg
- ^{†}Percentages estimated using US recommendations for adults, except for potassium, which is estimated based on expert recommendation from the National Academies.

Birch sap contains heterosides (betuloside and monotropitoside), 17 amino acids including glutamic acid, as well as minerals, enzymes, proteins, betulinic acid and betulin, antioxidants, sugar (fructose, glucose and small amounts of sucrose) and vitamins (C and B(group)).

== Nutritional and medicinal uses ==
Folk uses have been documented which include medicinal use, supplementary nutrition, and cosmetic applications for skin and hair.

Region	Traditional medicinal use	Cosmetic use
Belarus	lung diseases, gout, sickness	washing hair
Bulgaria		hair growth
Czech Republic	poor health, infertility	against freckles
Estonia	(prevention of) eye diseases, skin diseases, source of vitamins	washing hair, against freckles and to bleach the skin
Hungary	stomach and lung diseases	against freckles
Latvia	“revitalization”	washing hair
Poland	“revitalization”, kidney stones	washing hair in order to strengthen it
Romania	kidney stones, jaundice, as milk-rennet, scab, diuretic	hair colouring, to remove sunspots and moles
Russia	externally against sores, to help children during teething	washing face
Sweden	scurvy, cholera	
Ukraine	treating skin diseases, source of vitamins, diuretic	against freckles
United Kingdom	tonic, rheumatism, first nourishment for new-born children	prevention of baldness
United States	Poor health	

== Commercial birch sap and derivative products ==
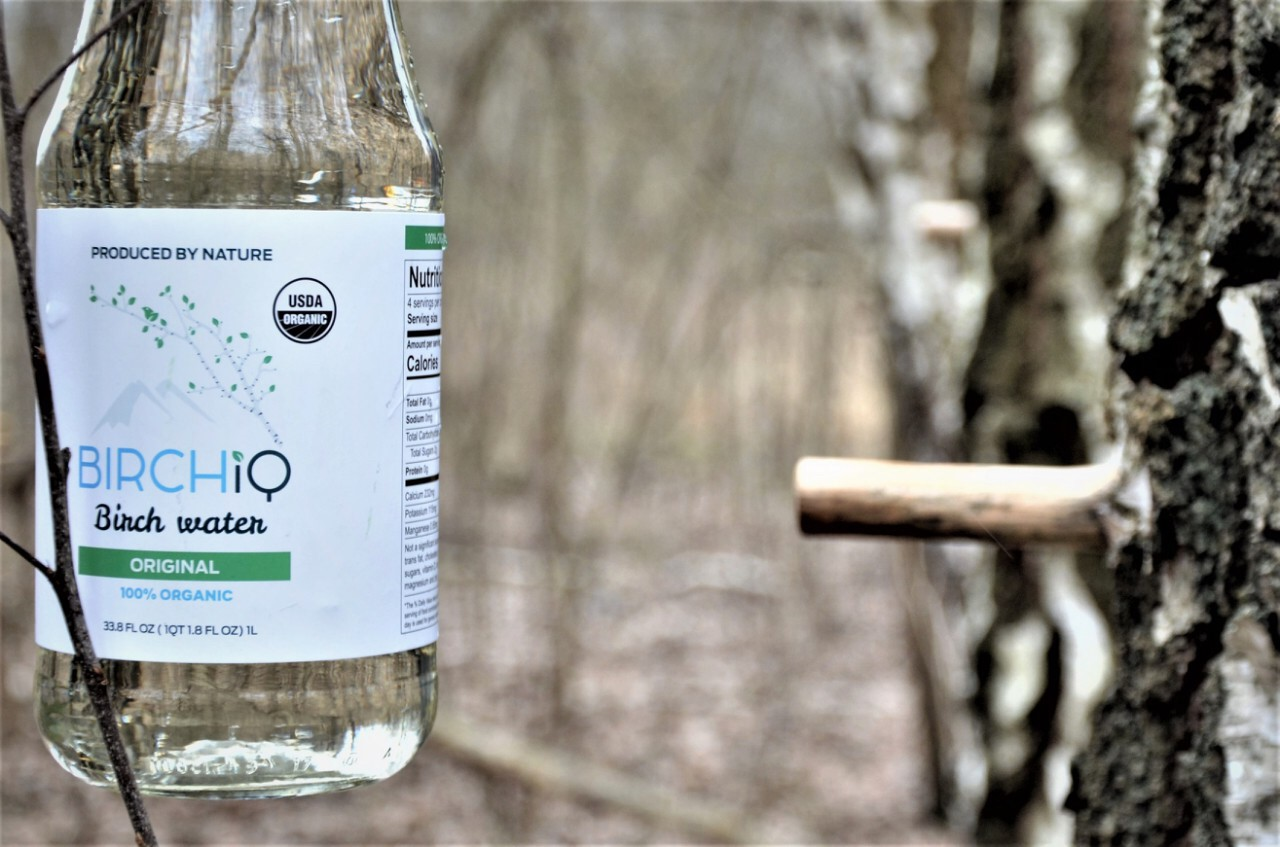
Bottle of Ukrainian commercial birch sap

Birch sap may be consumed both fresh and naturally fermented. Fresh birch sap is highly perishable; even if refrigerated, it is stable for only 7 days. Shelf life can be prolonged by freezing or preservation techniques. Existing preservation techniques include:

- Nothing i.e. bottled fresh sap (shelf life: 2–5 days refrigerated)
- Filtered with a 0.22-μ net (shelf life: 3 weeks refrigerated)
- Collected under anaerobic conditions (shelf life: 1 year ambient)
- Added sugar (3 g per 100 ml)
- Heat pasteurized, pasteurization should be conducted under specific temperature levels and times (shelf life: 1 year ambient). Although level of Vitamin C is lower than in fresh sap, all other benefits are preserved.
- Frozen at −25 °C (shelf life: 2 years)

Birch sap can also be used as an ingredient in food or drink recipes, such as birch beer or wintergreen-flavored candy.

Concentrated birch sap is used to make birch syrup, a very expensive type of syrup mainly made from paper birch in Alaska and Canada, and from several species in Latvia, Russia, Belarus, and Ukraine.
