= Byarozavik =

Belarusian traditional drink

Byarozavik (Belarusian: бярозавік) is a Belarusian traditional drink made from birch sap. Makers harvest the sap from birch trees once a year, from March to April. Tree damage from sap collection to make this drink led to a licensing system for the collection of sap, introduced in 2008.

Birch water is used medicinally, externally and internally. The sap contains many components including: sugars, fruit acids, potassium, calcium, phosphorus, magnesium, manganese, zinc, sodium, and iron. Unique elements include saponin, a nutrient that may help block cholesterol absorption.

Birch tree water is a traditional beverage in Belarus, Ukraine, Russia, Lithuania, Latvia, Estonia, Finland, and other parts of Northern Europe, and in parts of Northern China.

Entire research institutes were devoted to researching the benefits of this tree in the former Soviet Union. The birch tree water industry collapsed along with the demise of the USSR, and large scale production has only recently restarted.
