= Birch Creek (Menominee County, Michigan) =

Stream in Michigan, United States

Birch Creek is a stream in Menominee County, Michigan, in the United States. It is a tributary of Springer Creek.

The stream headwaters arise approximately 1.5 miles east of US Route 41 at 45°14′45″N 87°35′20″W and it flows generally southward past the community of Birch Creek. It enters Springer Creek approximately one-half mile from Green Bay at 45°11′01″N 87°34′25″W.

Birch Creek was named from groves of black birch near the stream.

== See also ==
- List of rivers of Michigan
