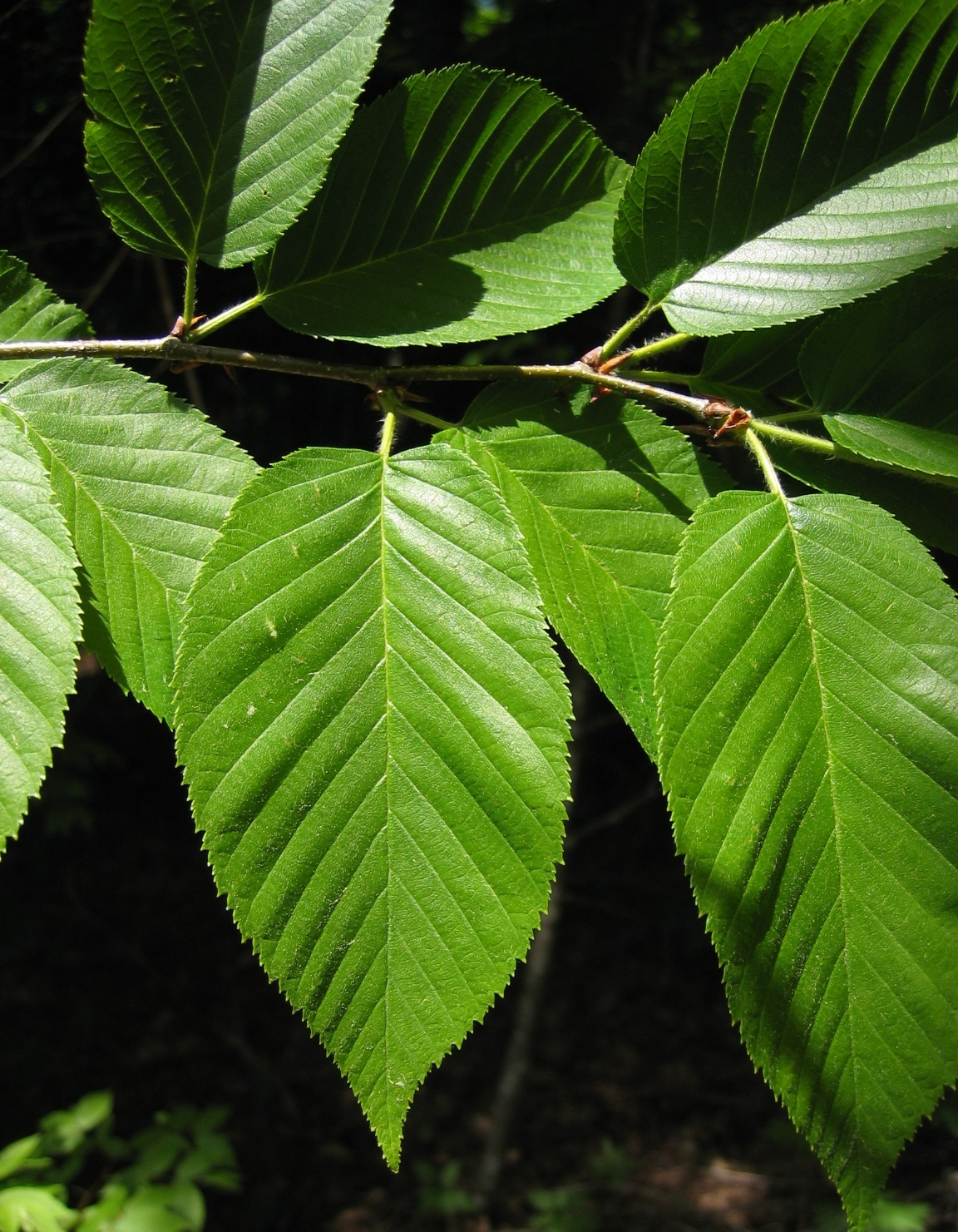
- Yellow birch foliage
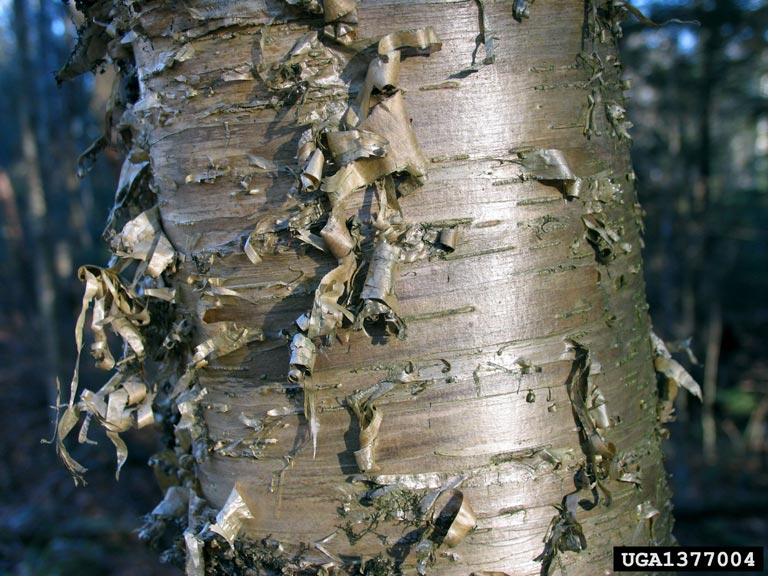
- Bark

Conservation status
- Least Concern (IUCN 3.1)

Scientific classification
- Kingdom: Plantae
- Clade: Embryophytes
- Clade: Tracheophytes
- Clade: Angiosperms
- Clade: Eudicots
- Clade: Rosids
- Order: Fagales
- Family: Betulaceae
- Genus: Betula
- Subgenus: Betula subg. Betulenta
- Species: B. alleghaniensis

Binomial name
- Betula alleghaniensis Britton
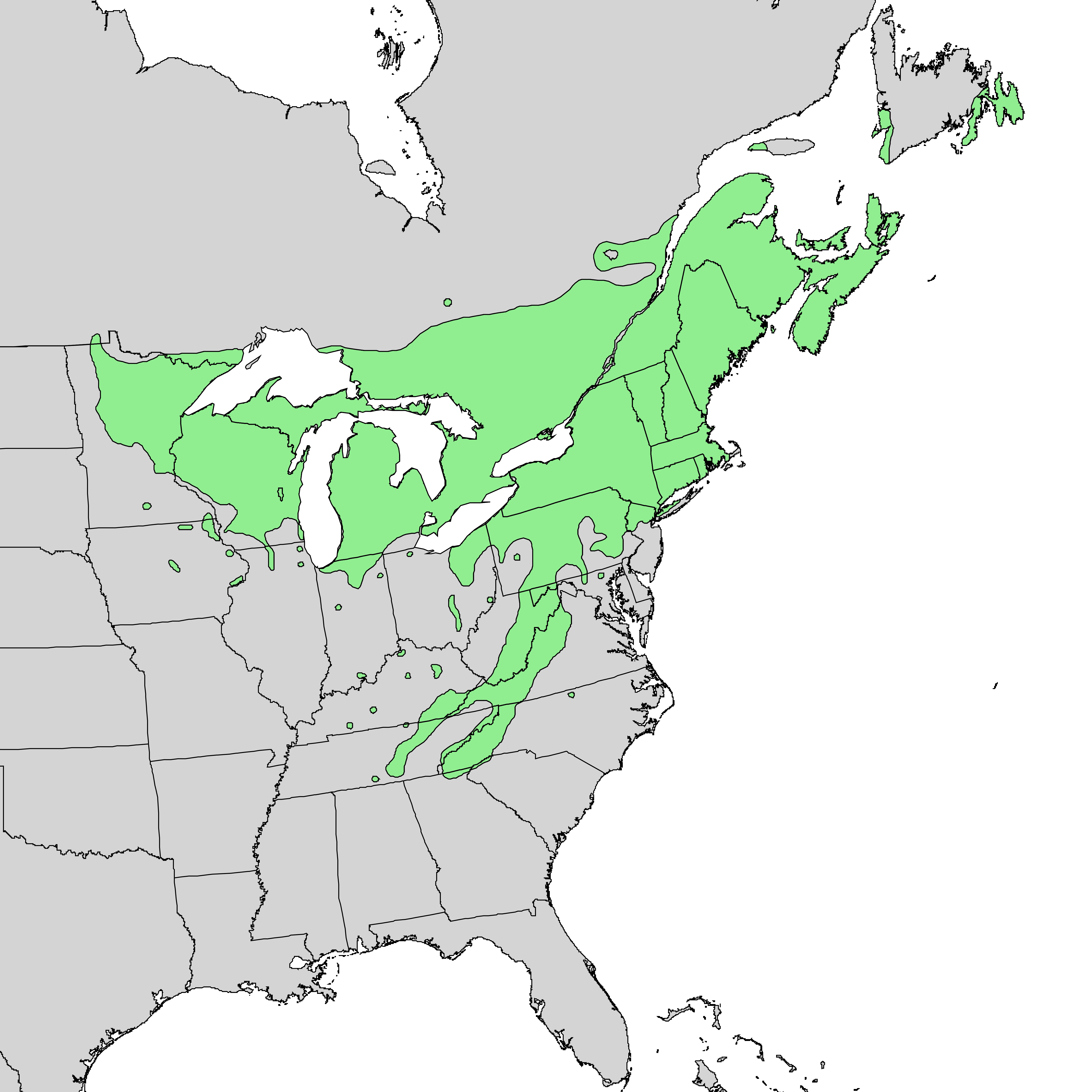
- Natural range of Betula alleghaniensis

Synonyms
- Betula lutea Michx.

= Betula alleghaniensis =

Species of tree in the birch family

Betula alleghaniensis, the yellow birch, golden birch, or swamp birch, is a large species of birch native to northeastern North America. Its vernacular names refer to the golden color of the tree's bark. In the past its scientific name was Betula lutea, the yellow birch.

It is an important lumber species and the sap can be used to make syrup. Additionally, it is the provincial tree of Quebec.

== Description ==
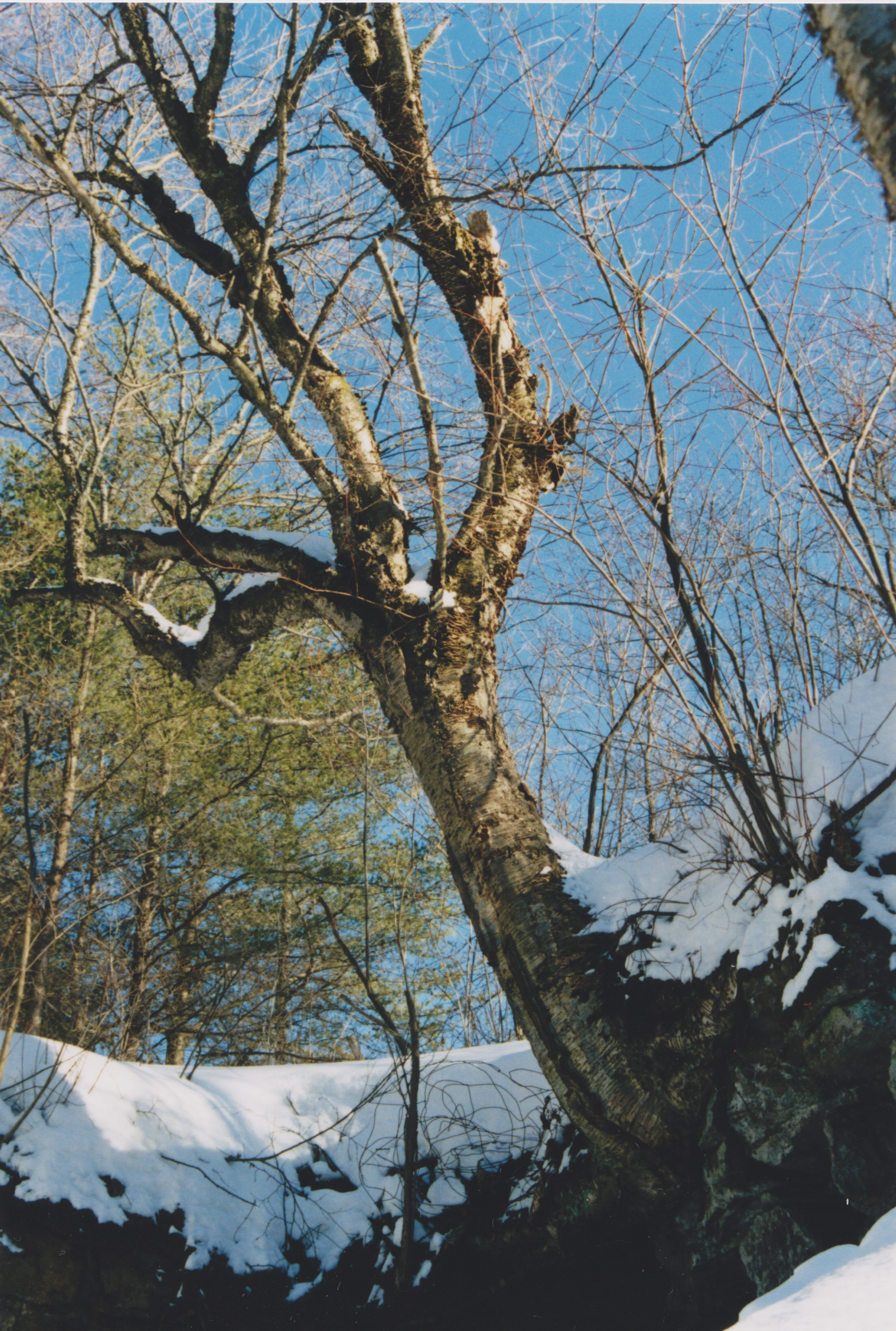
Betula alleghaniensis

Betula alleghaniensis is a medium-sized, typically single-stemmed, deciduous tree reaching 60–80 feet (18–24 m) tall (exceptionally to 100 ft (30 m)) with a trunk typically 2–3 ft (0.61–0.91 m) in diameter, making it the largest North American species of birch. Yellow birch is long-lived, typically 150 years and some old growth forest specimens may last for 300 years.

It mostly reproduces by seed. Mature trees typically start producing seeds at about 40 years but may start as young as 20. The optimum age for seed production is about 70 years. Good seed crops are not produced every year, and tend to be produced in intervals of 1–4 years with the years between good years having little seed production. The seeds germinate best on mossy logs, decaying wood or cracks in boulders since they cannot penetrate the leaf litter layer. This can lead to odd situations such as yellow birches with their roots growing around a tree stump, which when it eventually rots away leaves the birch standing atop stilt-like roots. Yellow birch saplings will not establish in full shade (under a closed canopy) so they typically need disturbances in a forest in order to establish and grow. The tree is fairly deep-rooted and sends out several long lateral roots.

- The bark on mature trees is a shiny yellow-bronze which flakes and peels in fine horizontal strips. The bark often has small black marks and dark horizontal lenticels. After the tree reaches a diameter greater than 1 ft (0.30 m) the bark typically stops shredding and reveal a platy outer bark although the thinner branches will still have the shreddy bark. There is an uncommon, alternate form of the tree (f. fallax) which grows in the southern part of the range. F. fallax has darker gray-brown bark which shreds less than the typical form.
- The twigs, when scraped, have a slight scent of wintergreen oil, though not as strongly so as the related sweet birch (B. lenta), which is the only other birch in North America to also smell of wintergreen. However, the potency of the odor is not considered a reliable identification method unless it is combined with other characteristics.
- The leaves are alternately placed on the stem, oval in shape with a pointed tip and often a slightly heart shaped (cordate) base. They are 2–5 in (5.1–12.7 cm) long and typically half as wide with a finely serrated (doubly serrate) margin. They are dark green in color on the upper side and lighter on the bottom, the veins on the bottom are also pubescent. The leaves arise in pairs or singularly from small spur shoots. In the fall the leaves turn a bright yellow color.
- The leaf has a very short petiole 1/4–1/2 in (1–1 cm) long.
- The flowers are wind-pollinated catkins which open in later spring. Both male and female flowers will occur on the same tree making the plant monoecious. The male catkins are 2–4 in (5–10 cm) long, yellow purple, pendulous (hang downwards), and occur in groups of 3–6 on the previous year's growth. The female catkins are erect (point upward) and 1.5–3 cm (5/8–1 1/8 in) long and oval in shape, they arise from short spur branches with the leaves. The fruit, mature in fall, is composed of numerous tiny winged seeds packed between the catkin bracts.
- The seed is a winged samara with two wings which are shorter than the width of the seed which matures and gets released in autumn.
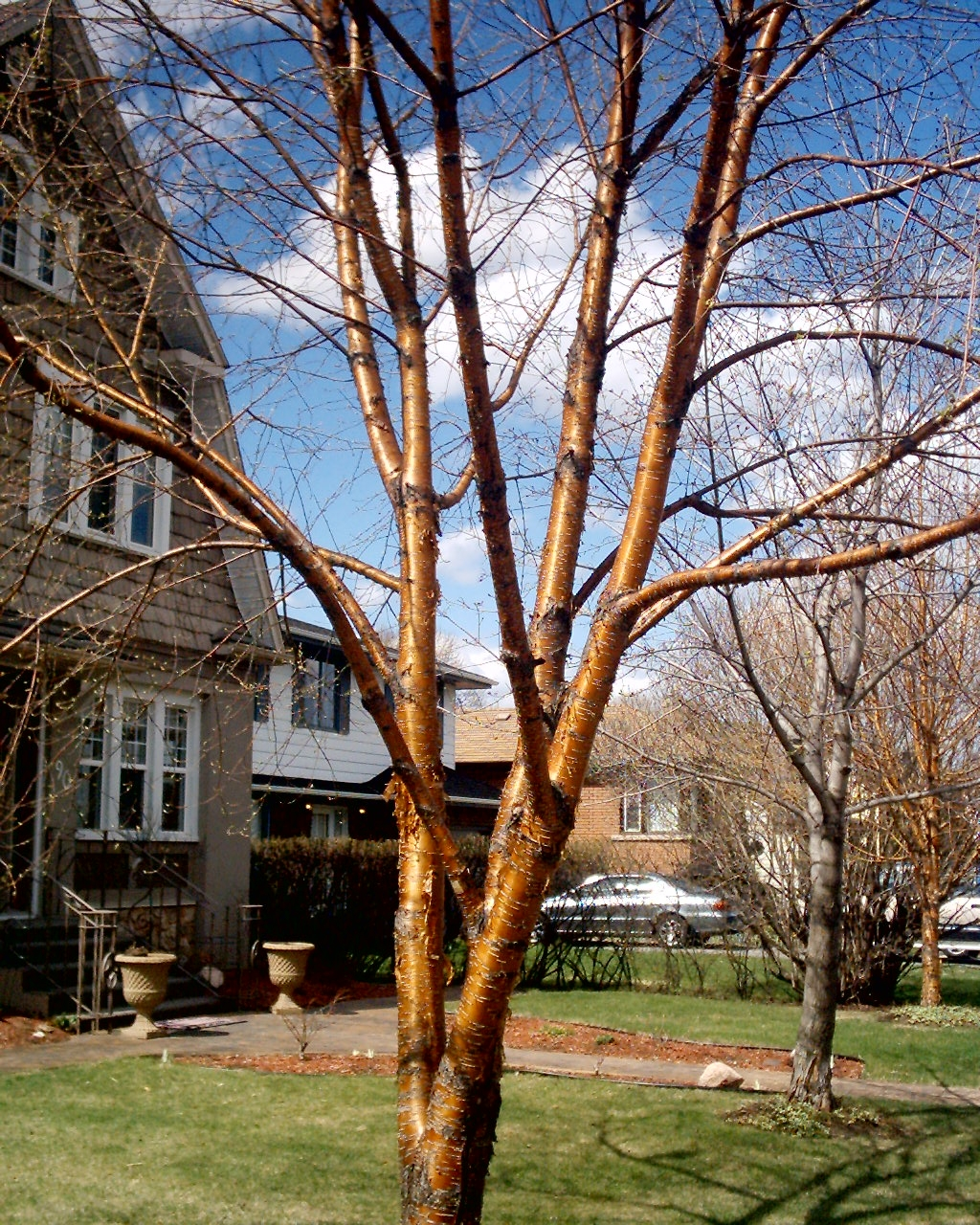
Young bark

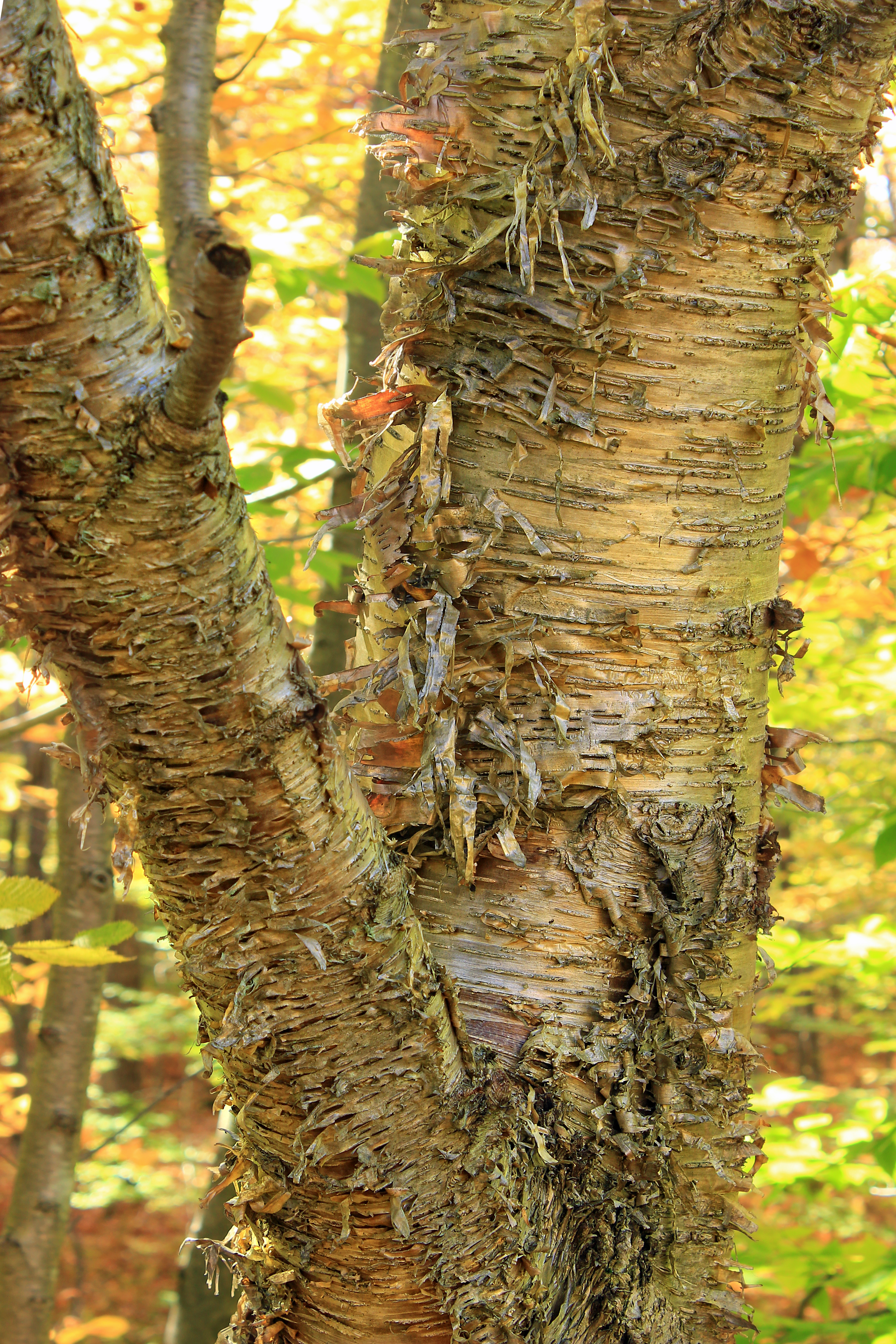
Mature bark

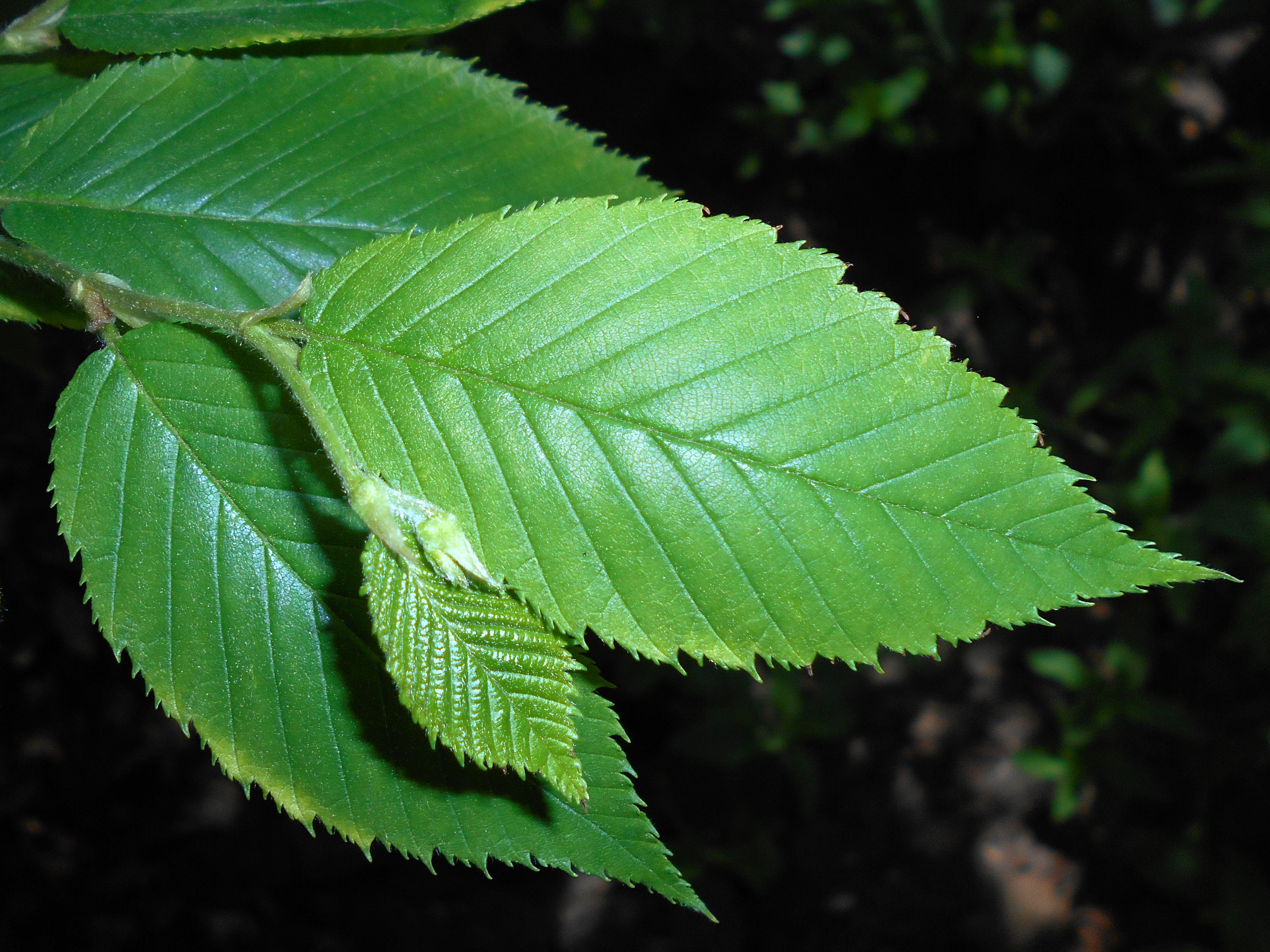
Leaves

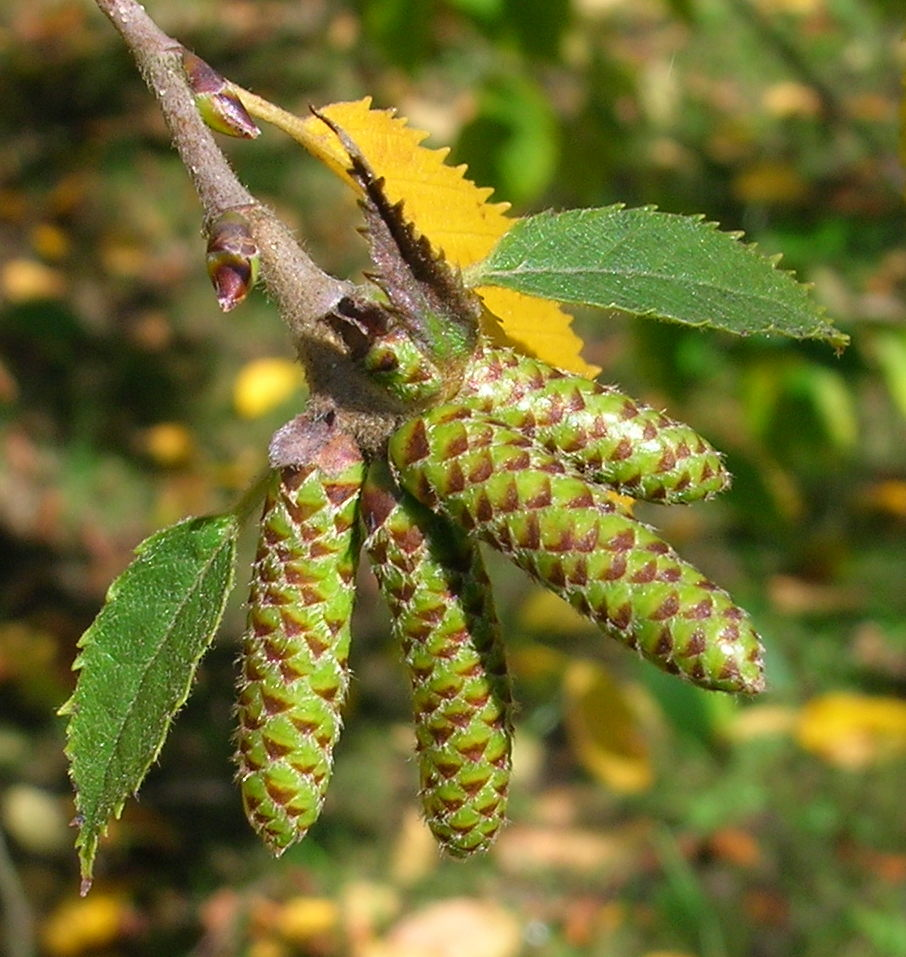
Catkins

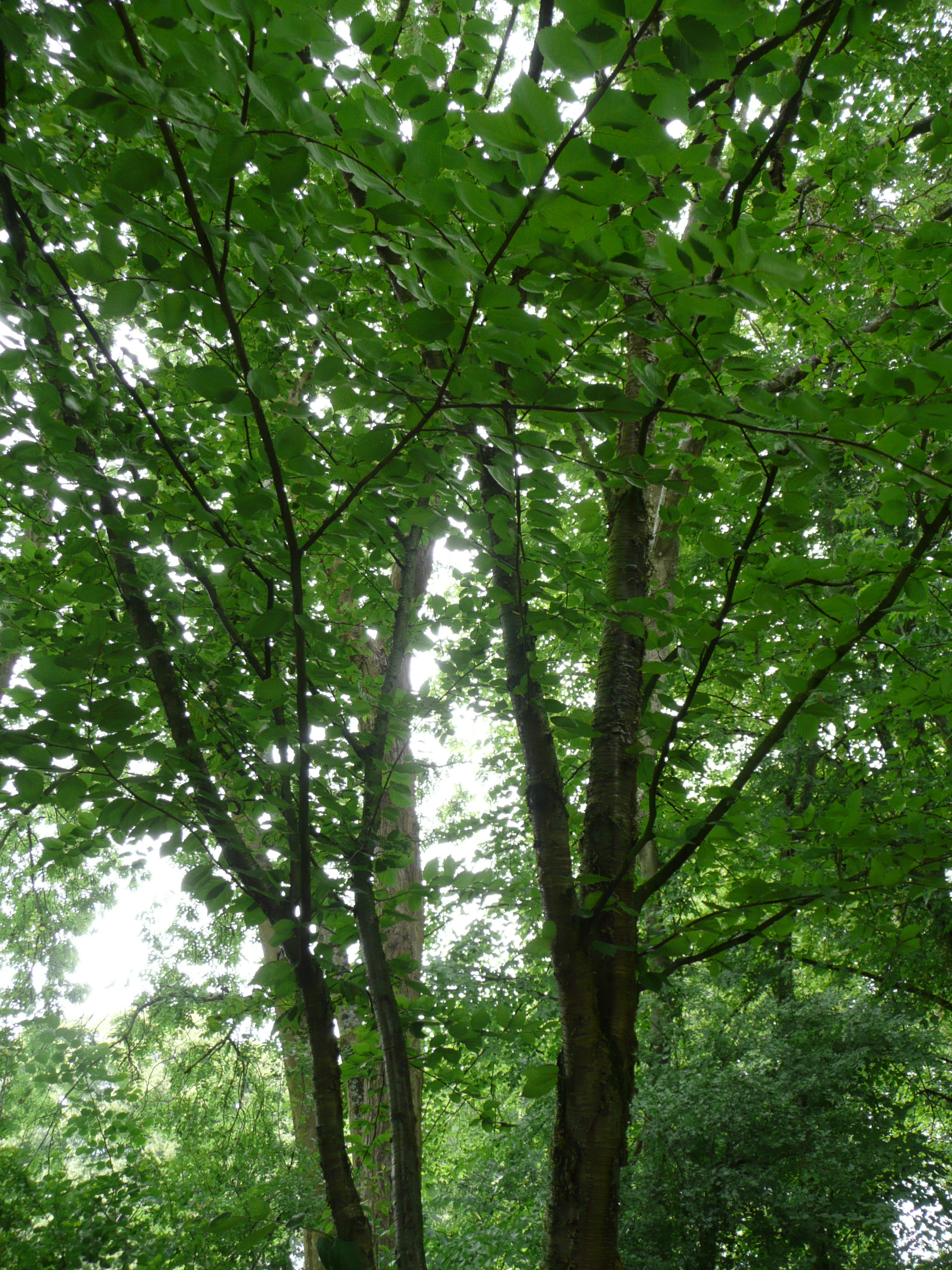
Form

=== Similarity to Betula lenta ===
Both yellow birch and sweet birch (B. lenta) have nearly identical leaf shape and both give an odor of wintergreen when crushed. Seedlings of the two species can be very hard to tell apart. To differentiate the two, the range, buds, or bark must be examined. The ranges do overlap in Appalachia where they commonly grow together, but sweet birch does not grow west of Ohio or north into Canada whereas yellow birch does. Sweet birch also has black non-peeling bark compared to the lighter, bronze colored, peeling bark of yellow birch. For young trees where bark has not yet developed, yellow birch can also be identified by its hairy buds and stems; sweet birch has hairless buds.

== Taxonomy ==
The yellow birch was first described by François André Michaux in 1812 as Betula lutea. In 1904, Nathaniel Lord Britton described what he considered to be a new closely related species of birch as Betula alleghaniensis, differing from B. lutea by its shorter fruiting scales and mostly cordate (vs. rarely cordate) leaf bases. After comparing the descriptions and illustrations of B. lutea and B. alleghaniensis, Merritt Fernald found the latter to be identical to B. lutea, but did confirm the existence of two varieties. Later, the name Betula lutea was determined illegitimate as it was superfluous to the older name that Michaux had listed as a synonym, Betula excelsa Aiton (1789). Additionally, the type specimen of Betula excelsa was found not to be a yellow birch, making Betula alleghaniensis the oldest and correct replacement name for the illegitimate B. lutea.

The specific epithet alleghaniensis means "of the Allegheny Mountains". In addition to "yellow" or "golden" birch, B. alleghaniensis has also been called gray birch, silver birch, tall birch, and swamp birch, though it shares several of these names with other Betula species.

=== Varieties ===
Several varieties have been named, but are not recognized as distinct by modern authors:

- B. a. var. alleghaniensis — scales on the fruiting catkins 5–8 mm
- B. a. var. macrolepis (Fernald) Brayshaw — scales on the fruiting catkins which measure 8–13 mm
- B. a. var. fallax (Fassett) Brayshaw — dark brown bark that typically does not exfoliate into shreds or curly flakes at the surface, especially noticeable when the bark is wet

=== Hybrids ===
- It hybridizes with Betula pumila to form Betula × purpusii in larch swamps. These hybrids are rather common and shrubby in growth pattern and may have an odor of wintergreen or rusty-hairy twigs. The leaf shape is intermediate between both species.
- It can also hybridize with Betula papyrifera in northern regions where their ranges overlap. It has seldom been reported but is thought to be more common than realized. In most features it is intermediate between the two parents.

== Distribution and habitat ==
Its native range extends from Newfoundland to Prince Edward Island, Nova Scotia, New Brunswick, southern Quebec and Ontario, and the southeast corner of Manitoba in Canada, west to Minnesota, and south in the Appalachian Mountains to northern Georgia. While its range extends as far south as Georgia, it is most abundant in the northern part of its range. In southern Pennsylvania, it is rare and generally only found along bodies of water in cool, mature woods, and it only occurs at high elevations from Maryland southward. It grows in USDA zones 3–7.

B. alleghaniensis prefers to grow in cooler conditions and is often found on north facing slopes, swamps, stream banks, and rich woods. It does not grow well in dry regions or regions with hot summers and will often last only 30–50 years in such conditions. It grows in soil with pH ranging 4–8.

== Ecology ==
The twigs are browsed on by whitetail deer, moose and cottontails Deer eat many saplings and may limit regeneration of the species if the deer population is too great. Ruffed grouse and various songbirds feed on the seeds and buds. Due to the thin bark of the tree yellow bellied sapsuckers feed on this tree by drilling holes in the tree and collecting the sap. Broad-winged hawks show a preference for nesting in yellow birch in New York.

Several species of Lepidoptera including the mourning cloak (Nymphalis antiopa) and dreamy duskywing (Erynnis icelus) feed on B. alleghaniensis as caterpillars.

Yellow birch is often associated with eastern hemlock throughout its range due to their similar preferences in habitat. It mostly grows at 0–500 m (0–1,640 ft) in elevation but may grow up to 1,000 m (3,300 ft). It reaches its maximum importance in the transition zone between low elevation deciduous forests and high elevation spruce and fir forests. Due to the thin bark and lack of ability to resprout, it is easily killed by wildfire.

Sugar maple (Acer saccharum) exerts allelopathic effects on seedlings of yellow birch and decreases their growth ability. The inhibitory chemical is exuded from the roots of the sugar maple and has a very short soil half-life, it no longer has effects on birch after 5 days.

== Conservation ==
It is listed as endangered in Illinois. Globally, the species is considered to be of "least concern" by the International Union for Conservation of Nature.

== Uses ==
Yellow birch is considered the most important species of birch for lumber and is the most important hardwood lumber tree in eastern Canada; as such, the wood of B. alleghaniensis is extensively used for flooring, furniture, doors, veneer, cabinetry, gun stocks and toothpicks. It was once popular for wagon wheels. Most wood sold as birch in North America is from this tree. Its wood is relatively strong, close grained, and heavy. The wood varies in color from reddish brown to creamy white and accepts stain and can be worked to a high polish. Like most birches, yellow birch wood rots quickly due to its tendency to trap moisture. The cellulose from rotting birch logs was collected by Native Americans and used as a quick fire starter.

In the past, yellow birch has been used for distilling wood alcohol, acetate of lime and for tar and oils. Oil of wintergreen can be distilled from the bark.

The papery, shredded bark, is very flammable due to its oil content and can be peeled off and used as a fire starter even in wet conditions.

Yellow birch can be tapped for syrup similarly to sugar maple, and although the sap has less sugar content, it flows in greater quantity than sugar maple. When the sap is boiled down, the wintergreen evaporates and leaves a syrup not unlike maple syrup. The sap can also be used as is in birch syrup or may be flavored. Tea can also be made from the twigs and inner bark.

=== Native American ethnobotany ===
Yellow birch has been used medicinally by Native Americans as a blood purifier and for other uses. The Ojibwe make a compound decoction from the inner bark and take it as a diuretic. They also make use of Betula alleghaniensis var. alleghaniensis, taking of the bark for internal blood diseases, and mixing its sap and maple sap used for a pleasant beverage. They use the bark of var. alleghaniensis to build dwellings, lodges, canoes, storage containers, sap dishes, rice baskets, buckets, trays and dishes and place on coffins when burying the dead.

== In culture ==
Betula alleghaniensis is the provincial tree of Quebec, where it is commonly called merisier, a name which in France is used for the wild cherry.
