= Birch beer =

Carbonated soft drink

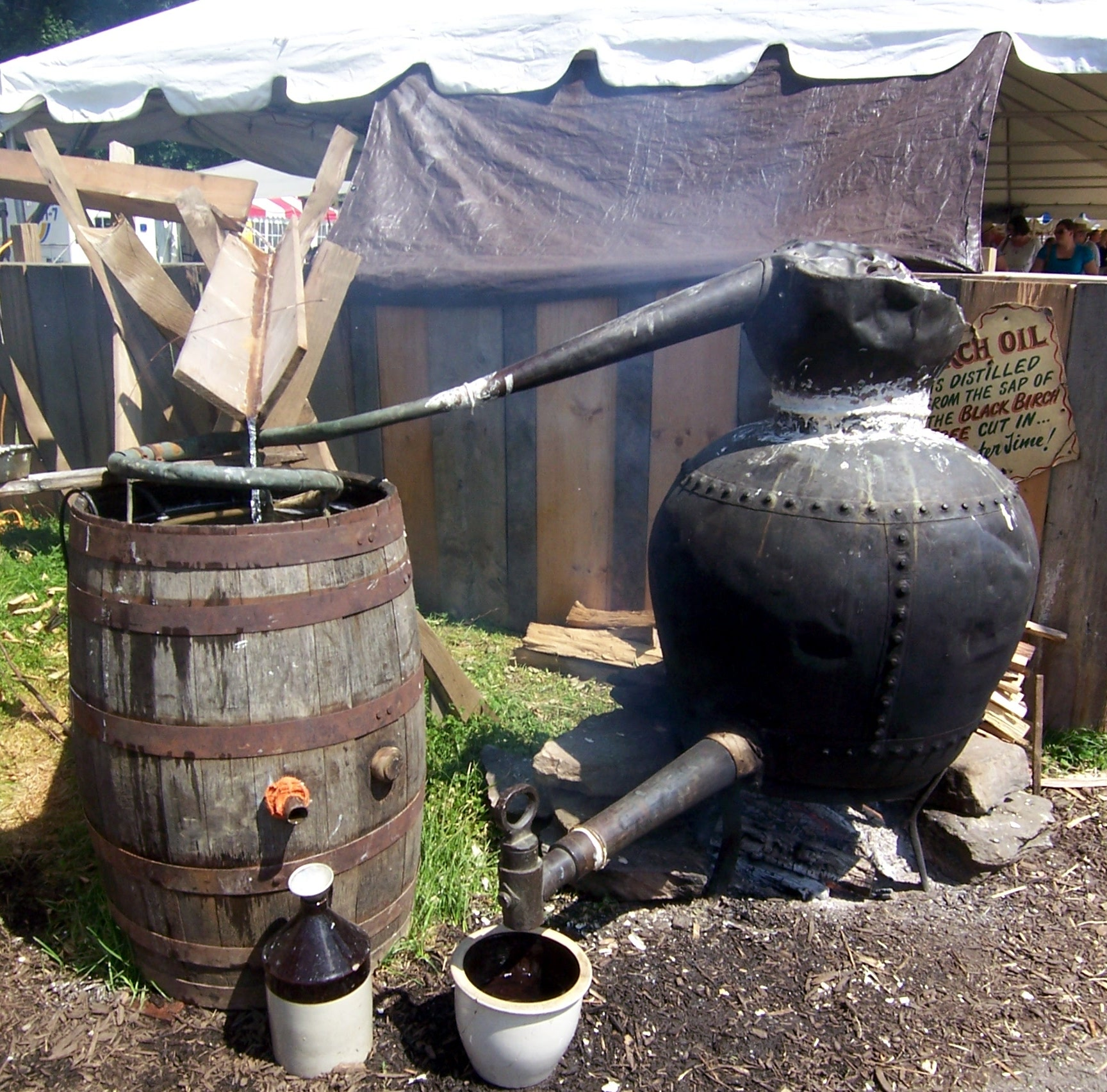
Working birch beer still at the Kutztown Folk Festival. Sign reads: "Birch oil is distilled from the sap of the Black Birch tree..."

Birch beer is a beverage similar to root beer. Traditionally birch beer was made with flavorings derived from birch bark and sweetened by birch sap. Today, birch beer is commonly found as a commercial carbonated soft drink flavored with a distilled extract of the bark and other botanicals such as cinnamon, vanilla and wintergreen, or with artificial flavorings. There are dozens of brands of birch beer available, ranging in color from clear to red to dark brown.

== Ingredients ==
Traditional recipes of birch beer usually are based on birch sap. Most recipes use fermented birch syrup, which is done using baker's yeast. The process of fermentation is done to decompose sugar to alcohol. Other common ingredients include sugar, cinnamon, vanilla beans, and water. Homemade recipes of birch beer also include honey and malt.

== Birch extract preparation ==
Various types of birch beer made from birch bark are available as well, distinguished by color. The color depends on the species of birch tree from which the birch oil is extracted (though enhancements by artificial coloring are commonly present). Popular colors include brown, red, blue and clear (often called white birch beer), though others are possible.

After the bark is collected, it is distilled to make birch oil. The oil is added to the carbonated drink to give it the distinctive flavor, reminiscent of wintergreen and methyl salicylate. Black birch is the most common source of extract in the northeastern region of the United States, where that species is indigenous.

== Birch beer varieties ==
Birch beer is most commonly found in the Northeastern United States and Newfoundland in Canada. "White" birch beer soda (which is usually transparent) is more common in New England; "red" birch beer (which is very dark and opaque) more common in the Mid-Atlantic.

In the dairy country of southeastern and central Pennsylvania, an ice cream soda made with vanilla ice cream and birch beer is called a "birch beer float", while chocolate ice cream and birch beer makes a "black cow".

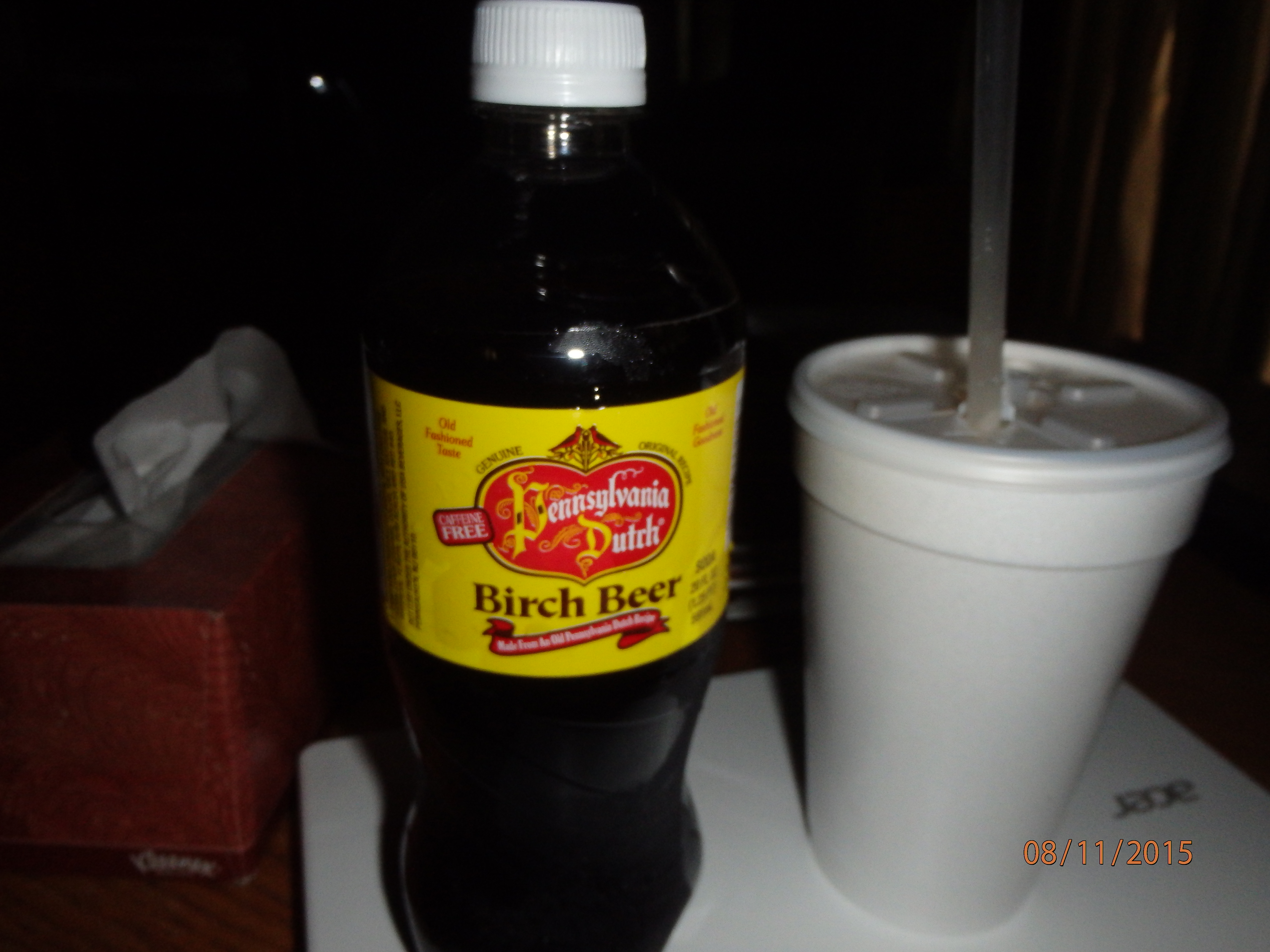
Pennsylvania Dutch branded Birch beer

Alcoholic birch beer, in which the birch sap is fermented, has been known from at least the seventeenth century. The following recipe is from 1676:

To every Gallon whereof, add a pound of refined Sugar, and boil it about a quarter or half an hour; then set it to cool, and add a very little Yeast to it, and it will ferment, and thereby purge itself from that little dross the Liquor and Sugar can yield: then put it in a Barrel, and add thereto a small proportion of Cinnamon and Mace bruised, about half an ounce of both to ten Gallons; then stop it very close, and about a month after bottle it; and in a few days you will have a most delicate brisk Wine of a flavor like unto Rhenish. Its Spirits are so volatile, that they are apt to break the Bottles, unless placed in a Refrigeratory, and when poured out, it gives a white head in the Glass. This Liquor is not of long duration, unless preserved very cool. Ale brewed of this Juice or Sap, is esteem'd very wholesome.

A mobile cart selling birch beer in 1909

== See also ==
- Birch syrup
- Spruce beer
- Sarsaparilla (soft drink)
- Root beer
