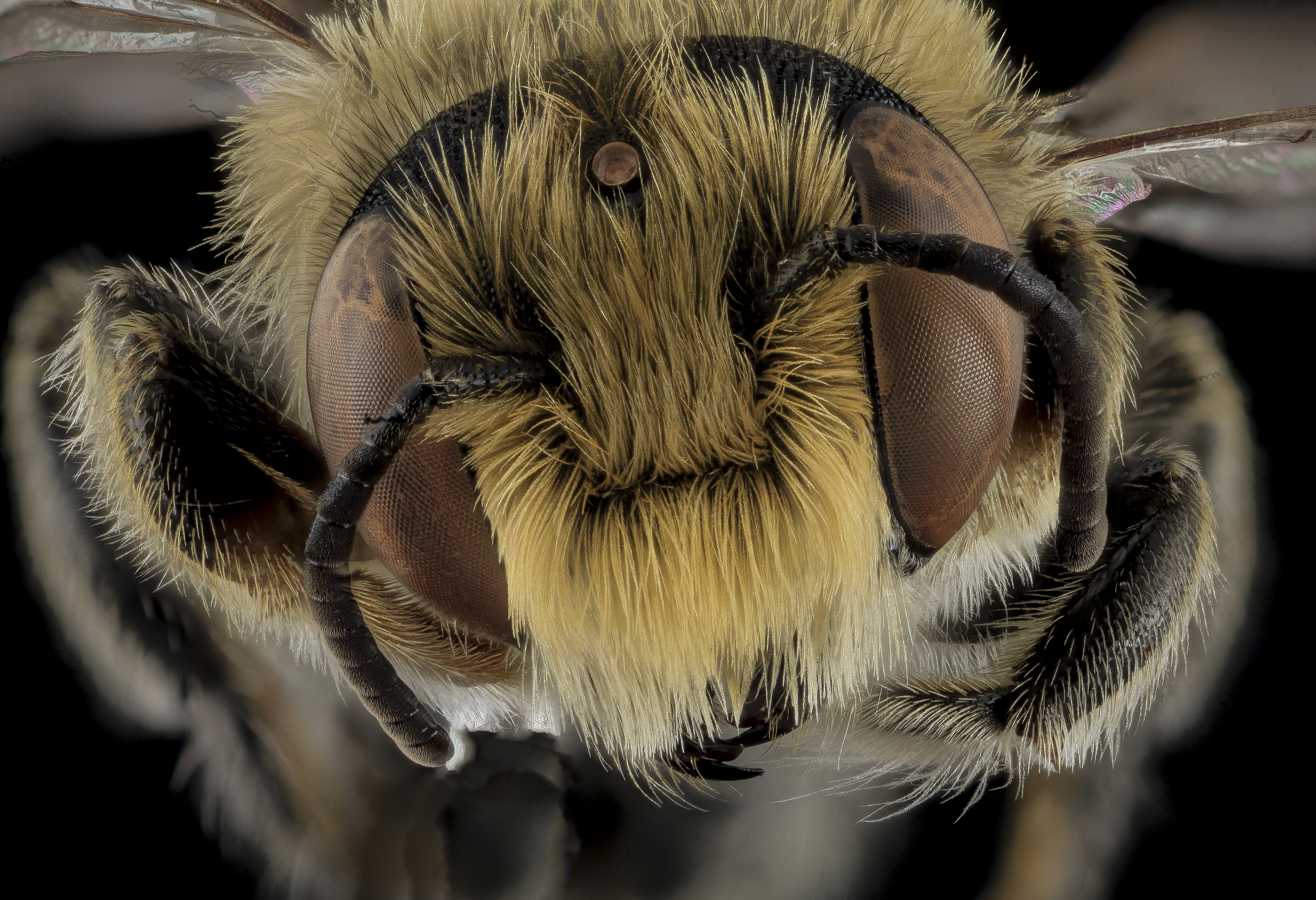

Conservation status
- Vulnerable (NatureServe)

Scientific classification
- Domain: Eukaryota
- Kingdom: Animalia
- Phylum: Arthropoda
- Class: Insecta
- Order: Hymenoptera
- Family: Megachilidae
- Genus: Megachile
- Species: M. rubi

Binomial name
- Megachile rubi Mitchell, 1924

= Megachile rubi =

Species of bee

Megachile rubi is a species of leaf cutting bee in the family Megachilidae, found in the eastern United States. First described by Mitchell in 1924, it is placed in the subgenus Xeromegachile, members of which are most often found in sandy areas and have distinct preferences in the petals and leaves they use in their nests.

== Description ==
Females can be distinguished from related species by the fact that the 6th tergite (dorsal abdominal plate) has short, flattened downy hairs with no erect or semi-erect hairs. Males are distinguished by the 7th tergite being tipped with a spiny protuberance.

== Distribution and habitat ==
Megachile rubi is native to the eastern part of the United States, its range extending from North Carolina to Florida. These bees are usually found in dry habitats such as sand dunes and areas of sandy scrub.

== Behaviour ==
M. rubi is a solitary bee species and nests in holes in the ground. Holes are excavated by the female at an angle of 20° to 45° from the horizontal and then level out underground. A small spoil heap of sandy material is thrown up near the entrance. The female constructs one or more cells in the burrow. Each cell is lined with pieces of cut leaf, the sweet birch (Betula lenta) being used in some instances. Each cell has 2 to 6 rounded base pieces, 8 to 14 rectangular side pieces forming several layers round the perimeter, and 2 to 6 rounded cap pieces. Each leaf portion is carefully cut and in the case of the side pieces, the portions forming the inner layers are smaller than the outer ones. The leaf-lined cell is two-thirds filled with a pollen and nectar mix and an egg is laid at one side before the cap is placed in position. In multi-cell nests, the next cell adjoins the previous one, end to end. Blister beetles (Lytta sp.) sometimes lay their eggs in the cell as parasites. When the last cell is capped and the nest is complete, the female drags sandy soil back into the burrow from the spoil heap, plugging the entrance.
