= Birch Creek (Bourbeuse River tributary) =

Stream in the U.S. state of Missouri

Birch Creek is a stream in Franklin County in the U.S. state of Missouri. It is a tributary of the Bourbeuse River.

The stream headwaters arise on the northeast side of St. Clair at 38°21′28″N 90°58′12″W and it flows north passing under and then running roughly parallel to Interstate 44. It crosses under US Route 50 just prior to its confluence with the Bourbeuse at 38°26′45″N 90°55′19″W about five miles east of Union.

Birch Creek was named for the birch trees lining its course.

== See also ==
- List of rivers of Missouri
