= Birch syrup =

Syrup made from birch sap

Birch syrup is a sweet and tangy tree syrup made from birch sap, and produced in much the same way as maple syrup. The flavor profile of the syrup varies throughout the season and the early syrup can be used on pancakes, waffles and breakfast items while the later syrup is more often used as an ingredient paired with meat and seafood dishes in sauces, glazes, and dressings. It is also commonly used in mixed drinks and coffees.

It is condensed from the sap, which has about 1% sugar content, depending on the species of birch, location, weather, and season. The finished syrup is 67% sugar. Birch sap sugar is about 42–54% fructose and 45% glucose, with a small amount of sucrose and trace amounts of galactose.

The main sugar in maple syrup is the more complex sucrose, and the chemical contents of maple syrup are also different, leading to a distinct flavor.

The flavor of the early run birch syrup is sweet and caramel-like which becomes darker and tangier and more molasses-like towards the end of the season. Different types of birch will produce slightly different flavor profiles; some more copper, others with hints of wildflower honey. While birch syrup has the same sugar content of maple, it is darker, stronger, and more complex.

== Method ==
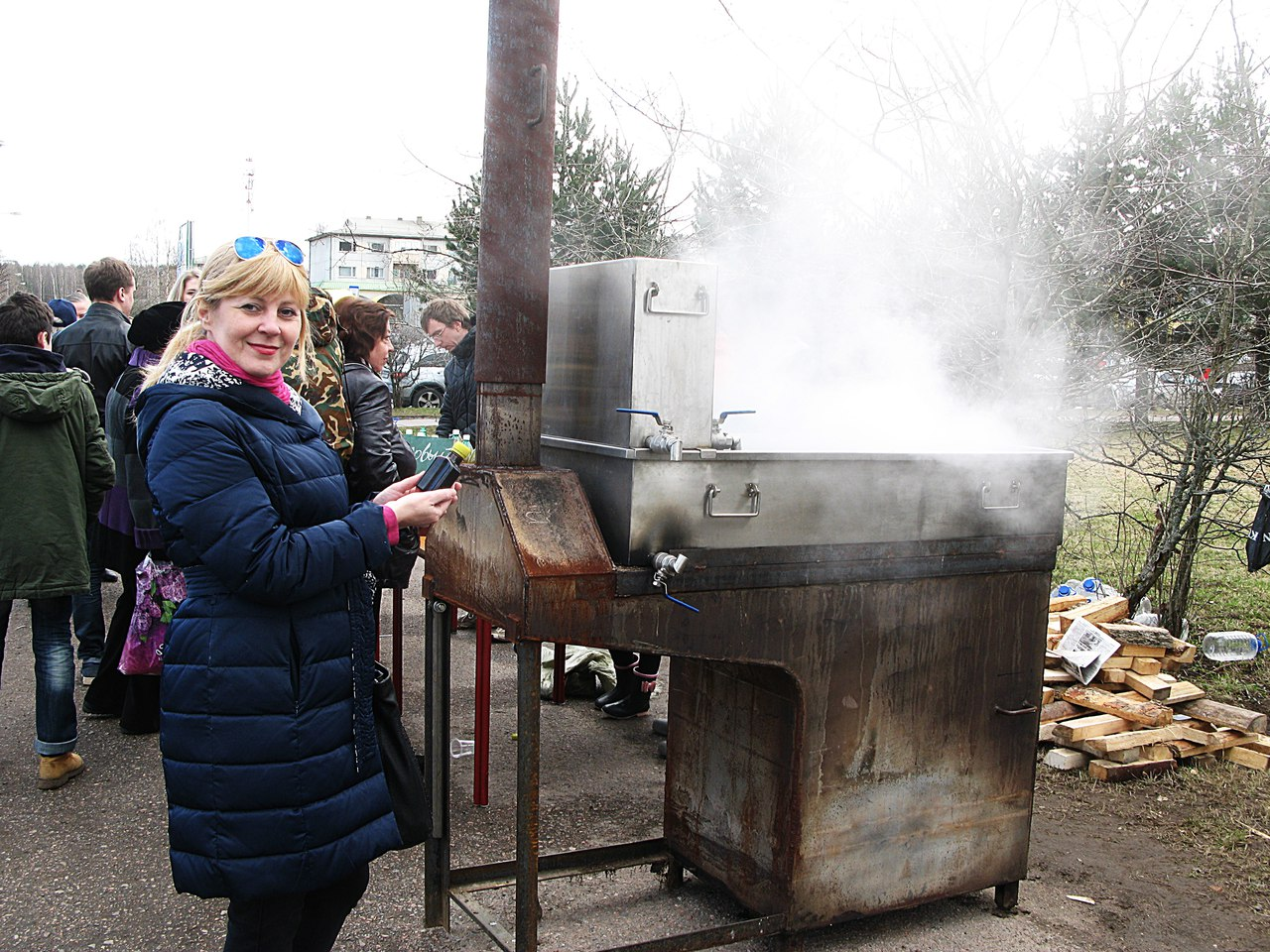
Birch sap festival, Russia: evaporation of birch sap into birch syrup

Making birch syrup is harder than making maple syrup, requiring about 110 gallons of sap to produce 1 gallon of syrup. Maple syrup takes approximately 40 gallons of sap to one gallon of syrup.

The tapping window for birch is generally shorter than for maple, primarily because birches live in more northerly climates. It also happens later in the year than maple tapping. The trees are tapped and their sap collected in the spring (generally mid- to late April, about two to three weeks before the leaves appear on the trees).

The common belief is that while birches have a lower trunk and root pressure than maples, pipeline or tubing method of sap collection used in large maple sugaring operations is not as useful in birch sap collection. However there are several birch syrup producers successfully using vacuum tubing system.

The sap is reduced in the same way as maple sap, using reverse osmosis machines and evaporators in commercial production. While maple sap may be boiled down without the use of reverse osmosis, birch syrup is difficult to produce this way. Birch sap is more temperature sensitive than maple sap because fructose, the primary sugar in birch sap, burns at a lower temperature than sucrose, the primary sugar in maple sap. This means that boiling birch sap to produce syrup can much more easily result in a scorched taste.

== Production ==
Most birch syrup is produced in Russia, Alaska and Canada from paper birch or Alaska birch sap (Betula papyrifera var. humilis and B. neoalaskana). These trees are found primarily in interior and south central Alaska. The Kenai birch (Betula papyrifera var. kenaica), which is used as well, grows most abundantly on the Kenai Peninsula, but is also found in the south central part of the state and hybridizes with B. humilis. The southeast Alaska variety is the Western paper birch (Betula papyrifera var. commutata), and has a lower sugar content. One litre of syrup from these trees requires evaporation of approximately 130–150 litres of sap.

Total production of birch syrup in Alaska is approximately 3,800 liters (1,000 U.S. gallons) per year. The syrup is also produced in other U.S. states and Canada (also from paper birch), Russia, Belarus, Ukraine, and Scandinavia (from different species of birch). Due to the higher sap-to-syrup ratio and difficulties in production, birch syrup is more expensive than maple syrup, up to five times the price.

== See also ==
- Birch beer
- Birch sap
- List of syrups
- Xylitol, a sugar alcohol extracted from birch
