= Birch Creek (Chouteau County, Montana) =

Location
- Country: Chouteau County, Montana, United States

Physical characteristics
- Source
  - coordinates: 48°05′36″N 109°36′14″W
- Mouth
  - coordinates: 47°44′55″N 109°34′33″W
  - elevation: 2,415 ft (736 m)

Birch Creek in Chouteau County, Montana is a minor tributary of the Missouri River, joining it just downstream of the Judith River. The stream headwaters is at the confluence of the East and West forks just north of Warrick.
