= Birch Creek, Michigan =

- Unincorporated community
- Location within the state of Michigan Birch Creek (the United States)
- Coordinates: 45°12′10″N 87°36′40″W
- Country: United States
- State: Michigan
- County: Menominee
- Township: Menominee
- Elevation: 650 ft (200 m)
- Time zone: UTC-6 (Central (CST))
  - Summer (DST): UTC-5 (CDT)
- ZIP code(s): 49858
- Area code: 906
- GNIS feature ID: 621398

Birch Creek is an unincorporated community in Menominee County, in the U.S. state of Michigan.

The community is on US Route 41 approximately four miles north of Menominee. The stream for which it is named flows past approximately one mile east of the village.

The community was named after nearby Birch Creek.
