= Birch Creek (Franklin County, Idaho) =

Stream in Franklin County, Idaho

- Location of the mouth of Birch Creek in Franklin County, Idaho

Location
- Country: United States
- State: Idaho
- Region: Franklin County
- Municipality: Preston, Idaho

Physical characteristics
- Source
  - location: Western slope of Bear River Range 421117N 1113754W
  - coordinates: 42°11′17″N 111°37′54″W
  - elevation: 7,650 ft (2,330 m)
- Mouth: Confluence with Mink Creek
  - coordinates: 42°13′47″N 111°43′36″W
  - elevation: 4,964 ft (1,513 m)

Birch Creek is a 6.1-mile-long (9.8 km) northeastward-flowing stream originating on the western slope of the Bear River Range in Franklin County, Idaho, United States. Its mouth is at the confluence with Mink Creek about 12 miles (19 km) northwest of Preston, Idaho. In turn, Mink Creek flows southwest to its confluence with the Bear River and, from there, its flows terminate in the Great Salt Lake.

== Ecology ==
Birch Creek hosts Bonneville cutthroat trout (Oncorhynchus clarkii utah), a subspecies of cutthroat trout native to tributaries of the Great Salt Lake, and one of 14 or so recognized subspecies of cutthroat trout native to the western United States. In addition to increased drought, Bonneville cutthroat are threatened by introduced non-native trout species through predation, competition, and hybridization. The instream and riparian degradation of Birch Creek is associated with decades of heavy cattle grazing pressure, removal of beaver (Castor canadensis), and encroachment of pinyon and juniper forests. Channel incision has lowered the water table and reduced floodplain connectivity, further harming riparian areas, which are critical habitat for a variety of aquatic and riparian obligate species, particularly greater sage-grouse (Centrocercus urophasianus). A project to restore beavers to the creek, led by Idaho rancher Jay Wilde and a Utah State University watershed scientist, began with reduced riparian grazing pressure and the construction of beaver dam analogs, followed by translocation of beavers to the stream, and has increased cutthroat trout abundance ten-fold.

== See also ==
- Bear River Range
- Bear River
