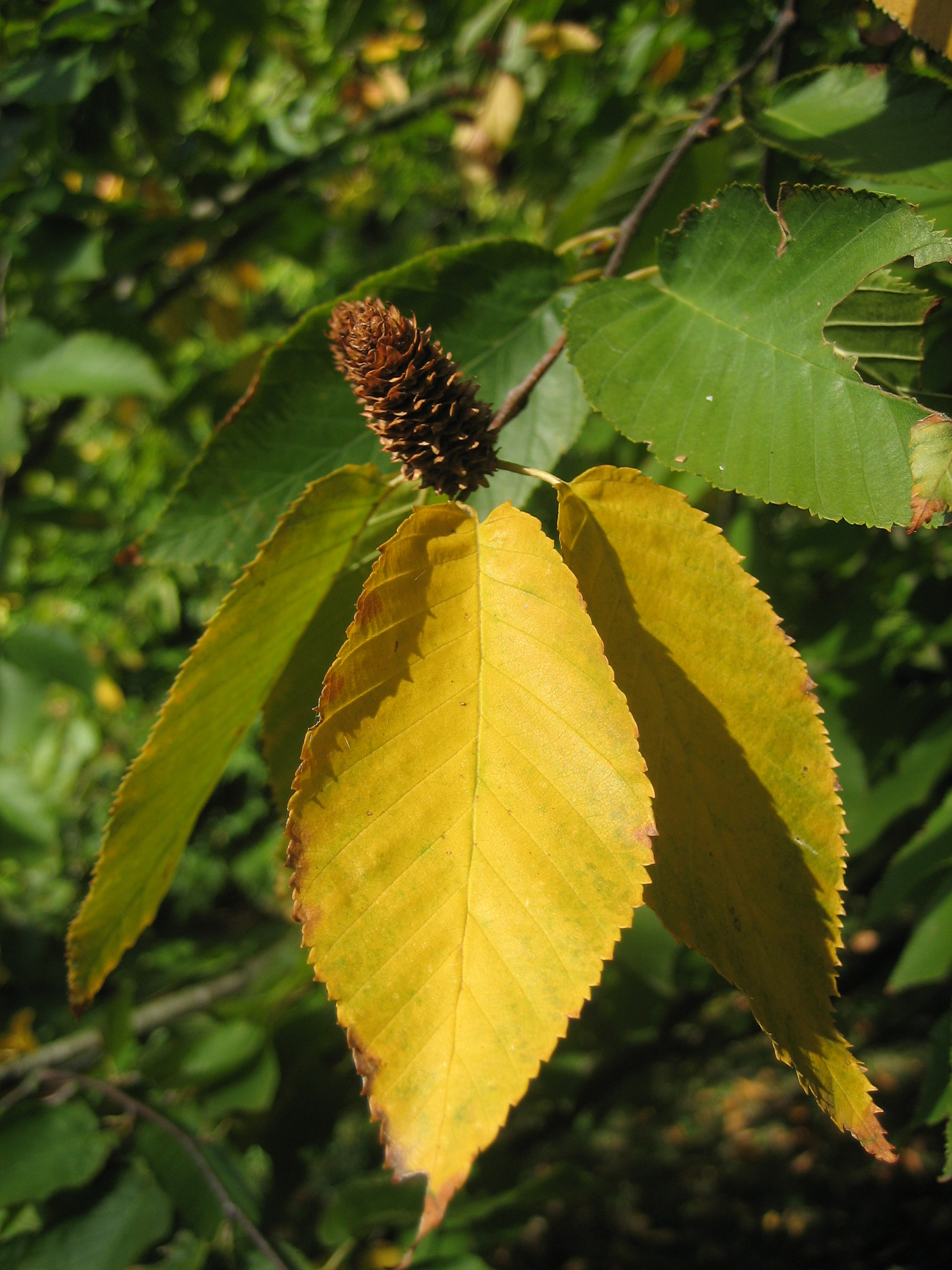

Conservation status
- Least Concern (IUCN 3.1)

- Secure (NatureServe)

Scientific classification
- Kingdom: Plantae
- Clade: Embryophytes
- Clade: Tracheophytes
- Clade: Angiosperms
- Clade: Eudicots
- Clade: Rosids
- Order: Fagales
- Family: Betulaceae
- Genus: Betula
- Subgenus: Betula subg. Betulenta
- Species: B. lenta

Binomial name
- Betula lenta L.
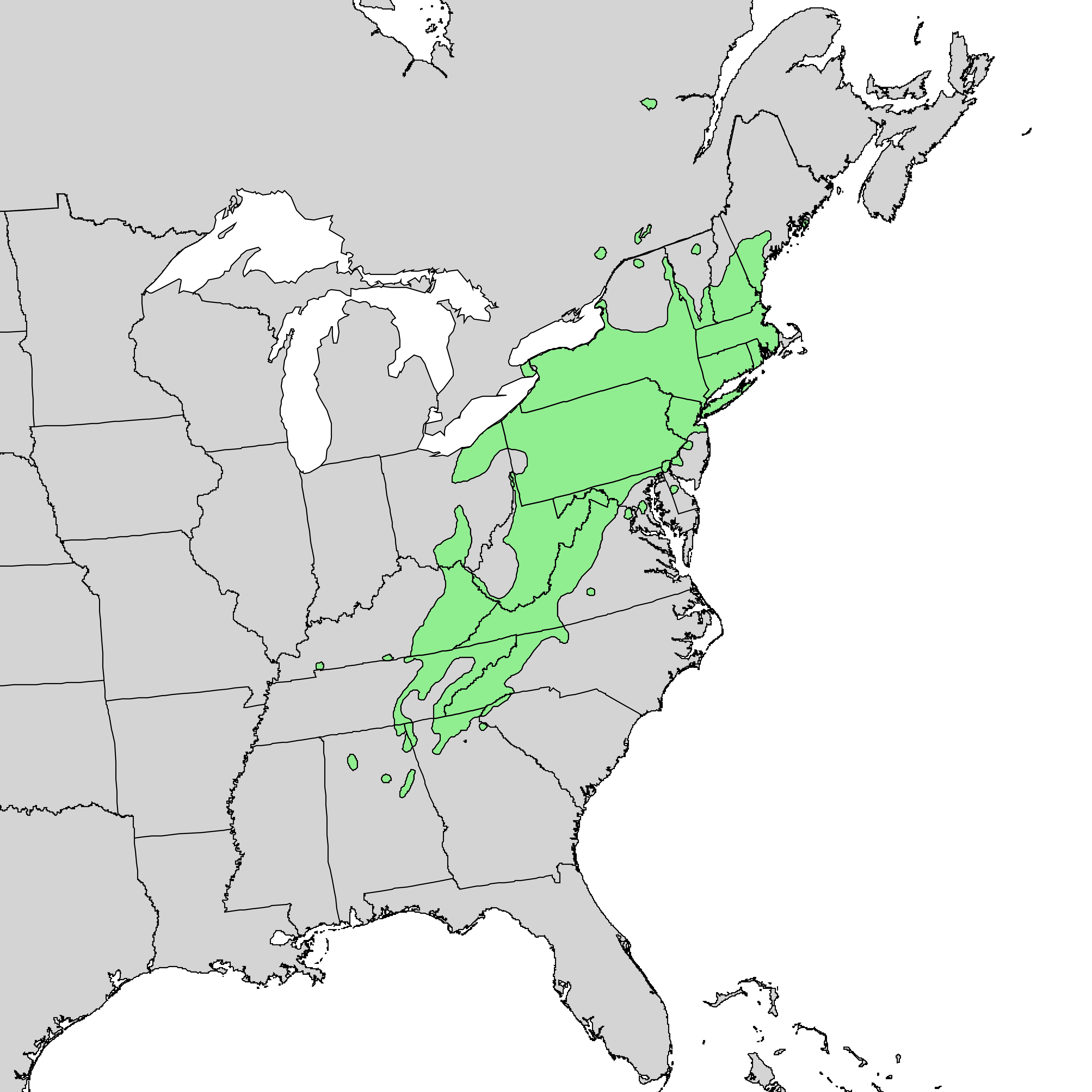
- Natural range of Betula lenta

= Betula lenta =

Sweet birch

Species of plant

Betula lenta (sweet birch, also known as black birch, cherry birch, mahogany birch, or spice birch) is a species of birch native to eastern North America.

== Description ==
Betula lenta is a medium-sized deciduous tree reaching 30 metres (98 ft) tall, exceptionally to 35 m (115 ft) with a trunk up to 60 cm (2 ft) diameter. Heights of 15 m (50 ft) to 24 m (80 ft) are more typical. In younger trees the bark is characteristic of most birches, with smooth bark and distinct horizontal lenticels. It is sometimes mistakenly identified as a cherry tree.

In older tree specimens the bark (unlike the more commonly known birches) develops vertical cracks into irregular scaly plates revealing rough dark brown bark patterns. This, however, only occurs in mature, or ancient, trees and these specimens are not often identified by the public as B. lenta due to the difference between the tree's smooth young bark (which the public is most familiar with) and the tree's rough, cracked and plated mature bark. The twigs, when scraped, have a strong scent of wintergreen due to methyl salicylate, which is produced in the bark.

The leaves are alternate, ovate, 6–15 cm (2.4–5.9 in) long and 4 to 8 cm (1.6–3.1 in) broad, with a finely serrated margin. The flowers are wind-pollinated catkins 2.5–3 cm (0.98–1.2 in) long. B. lenta is monoecious, producing both the male catkins which are pendulous, the female catkins which are erect. The fruit, maturing in fall, is composed of numerous tiny winged seeds packed between the catkin bracts. Seed production mainly occurs in trees that are between 40 and 200 years old, although light crops may occur as early as 16 years and as long as the tree lives.

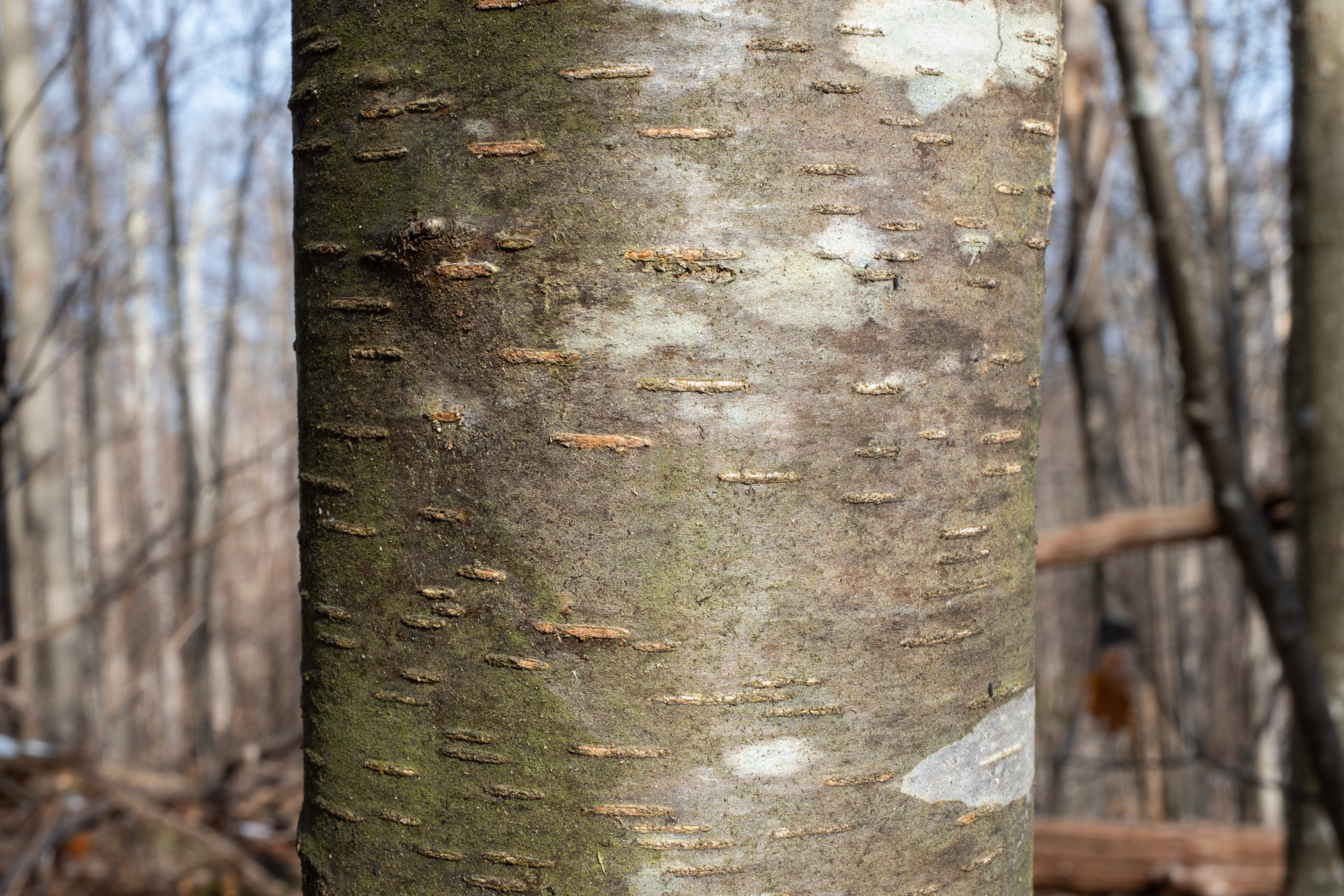
Closeup of young bark before it begins to form vertical cracks

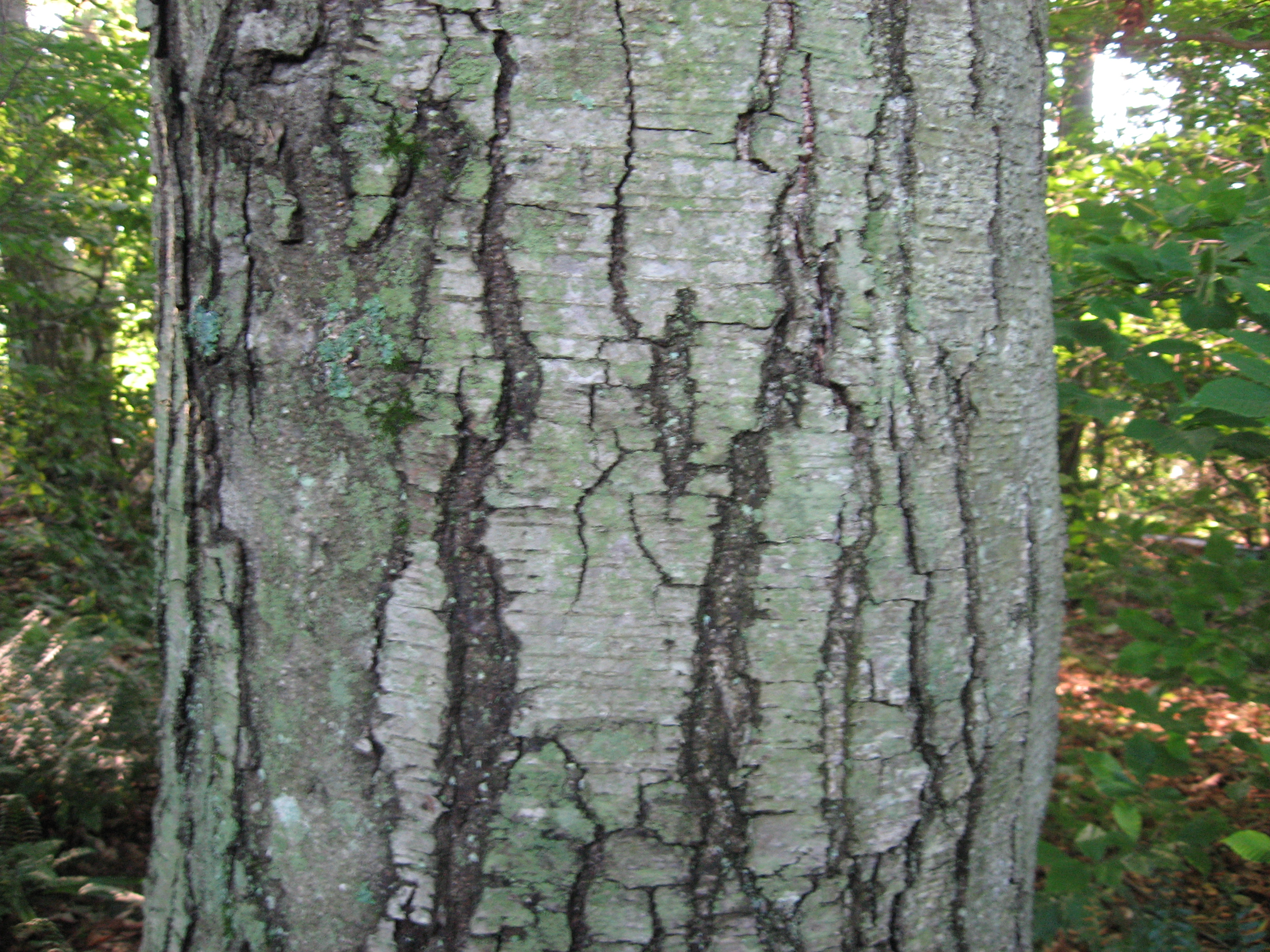
Closeup of bark beginning to crack and peel its first layer

=== Age ===
The oldest known B. lenta has been confirmed to be 368 years old, and the species may live even longer in an undisturbed ancient forest. Due to the cracking and developing of bark plates, a rough age estimate can be determined by how many bark layers a tree has. Generally the tree's smooth young bark begins to split around 40–50 years of age, and then begins to peel off the trunk around the age of 70-80. It is then replaced by another layer of bark, which will begin to peel at around 130–150 years. The third layer will peel when the tree has reached 200–210 years and achieved "old growth" status. This will continue to occur as long as the tree lives, but the individual bark layers become indiscernible after roughly 250 years of age.

Black birch seeds at a prolific rate and quickly colonizes disturbed areas. In the Northeastern US in the 1980s, infestations of spongy moths, Hemlock woolly adelgid, and Discula destructiva killed many trees, and their place was taken by black birch.

== Distribution and habitat ==
The species is native to eastern North America, from southern Maine west to southernmost Ontario, and south in the Appalachian Mountains to northern Georgia.

== Ecology ==
The leaves of this species serve as food for some caterpillars and the solitary leaf-cutter bee Megachile rubi cuts pieces from the leaves to line the cells of its nest.

Deer do not tend to browse young B. lenta allowing trees to grow in areas with high deer populations, Betula alleghaniensis, a close relative of B. lenta, is, however, heavily browsed by deer. This accounts for a lack of B. alleghaniensis and an abundance of B. lenta where deer populations are high. In abandoned fields, B. lenta is often thicket forming and protects trees not resistant to deer browsing.

== Uses ==
The wood of black birch is heavy at 47 pounds per cubic foot and is used for furniture, millwork, and cabinets. It is similar to yellow birch wood and often not distinguished from it in the lumber trade.

The sap flows about a month later than maple sap, and much faster. The trees can be tapped in a similar fashion, but must be gathered about three times more often. Birch sap can be boiled the same as maple sap, but its syrup is stronger (like molasses). It can be used to make birch beer. Boiling also destroys volatile quantities of wintergreen oil.

The inner bark can be eaten raw as an emergency food. The twigs and inner bark can be steeped to make tea.

Black birch was once harvested extensively to produce oil of wintergreen, the tree was borderline endangered until the 1950s-60s when synthetic oil of wintergreen appeared.
