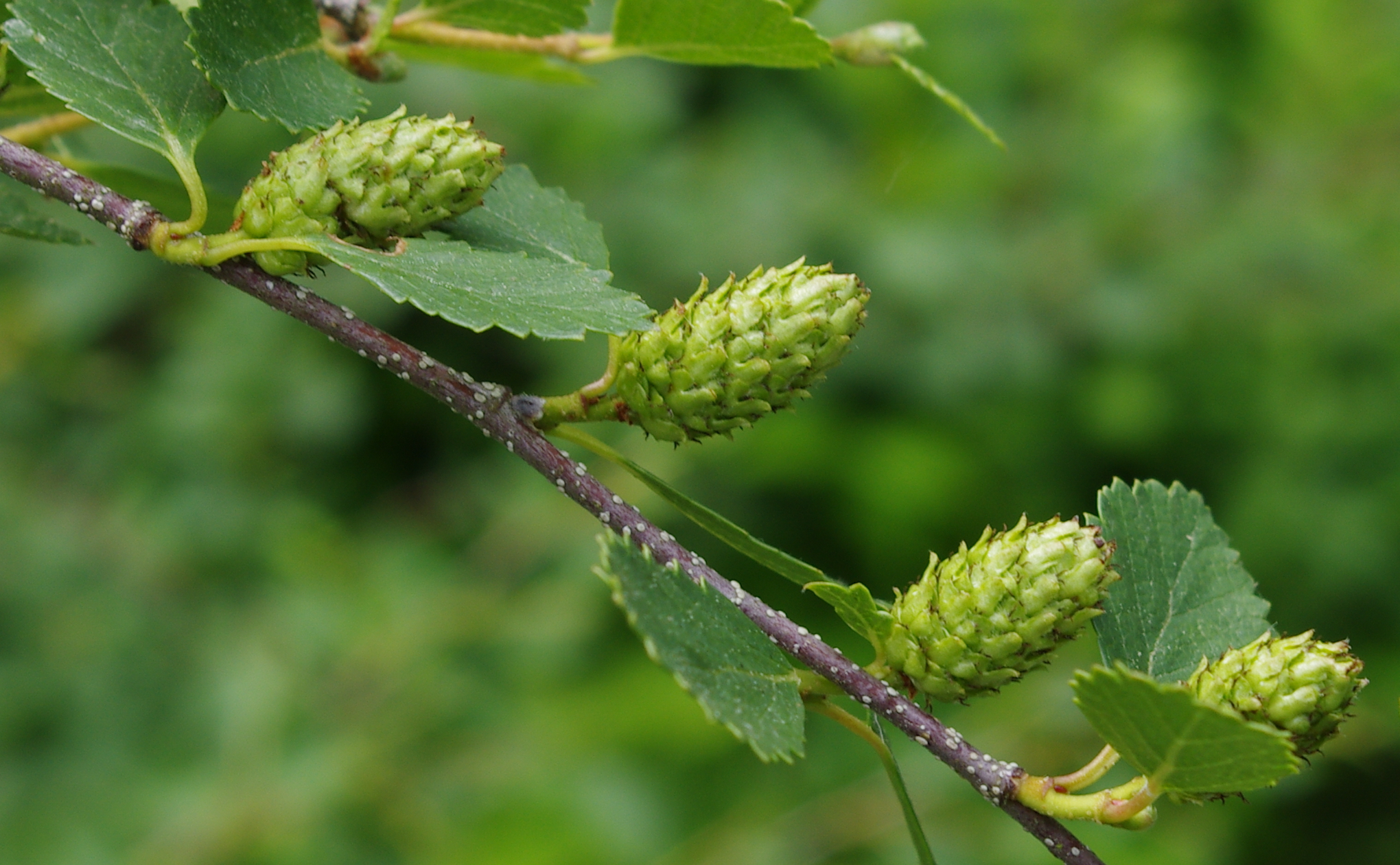

Conservation status
- Least Concern (IUCN 3.1)

- Secure (NatureServe)

Scientific classification
- Kingdom: Plantae
- Clade: Embryophytes
- Clade: Tracheophytes
- Clade: Angiosperms
- Clade: Eudicots
- Clade: Rosids
- Order: Fagales
- Family: Betulaceae
- Genus: Betula
- Subgenus: Betula subg. Chamaebetula
- Species: B. glandulosa

Binomial name
- Betula glandulosa Michx.

= Betula glandulosa =

American dwarf birch

Species of flowering plant

Betula glandulosa, the American dwarf birch, also known as resin birch or shrub birch, is a species of birch native to North America.

== Description ==
American dwarf birch is a multi-stemmed shrub typically growing to 1–3 m (3.3–9.8 ft) tall, often forming dense thickets. The trunks are slender, rarely over 5–10 cm (2–4 in) diameter, with smooth, dark brown bark. The leaves are nearly circular to oval, 0.5–3 cm (1/4–1 1/8 in) long and 1–2.5 cm (3/8–1 in) broad, with a toothed margin. The fruiting catkins are erect, 1–2.5 cm (3/8–1 in) long and 5–12 mm (3/16–15/32 in) broad.

It is closely related to the dwarf birch (Betula nana), and is sometimes treated as a subspecies of it, as B. nana subsp. glandulosa. It is distinguished from typical B. nana by the presence of glandular warts on the shoots and longer leaf petioles. Hybrids with several other birches occur.

== Distribution and habitat ==
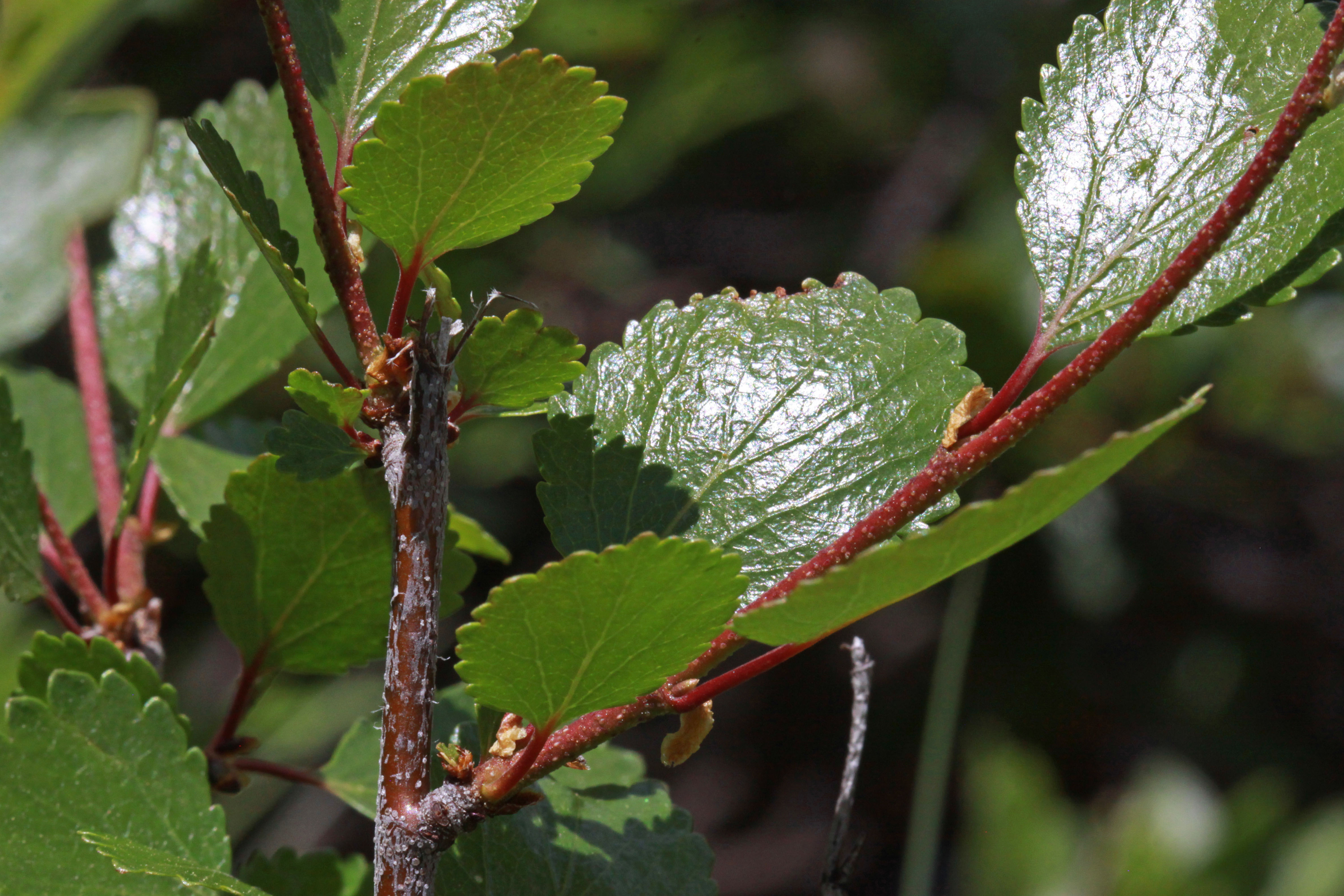
Betula glandulosa, taken at Chepeta Lake, Uintah, Utah.

This plant occurs in arctic and cool temperate areas from Alaska east to Newfoundland and southern Greenland, and south at high elevations to northern California, Colorado, and the Black Hills of South Dakota in the west, and locally south to northern New York in the east. In the Arctic, it occurs down to sea level, while in the south of the range, it grows as high as 3,400 metres (11,200 ft) elevation.

It is typically a wetland species, growing in bogs, muskegs, or other moist and nutrient-deficient soils, but can be found in a wide variety of sites, ranging from rocky subarctic locales to boreal forests with deep, organic-rich soils. It is the most common shrub at treeline in interior Alaska, forming a nearly continuous zone between the treeline and alpine tundra.

== Ecology ==
Many species of wildlife rely on this shrub as a food source, particularly ungulates such as moose, deer, caribou and elk. Its preference as a food source varies depending on the specific population; moose in Alberta, for example, are known to graze on it heavily, whereas moose in Alaska are observed to eat it at low levels. Bears, small mammals, birds, and insects also rely on the shrub as a food source.

American dwarf birch provides cover for ptarmigans, and grizzly bears use it consistently to construct their dens.

This species is valued for its erosion control potential, and has been used to help stabilize stream-banks.
