= Gracefulness =

Display of elegant movement, poise, or balance

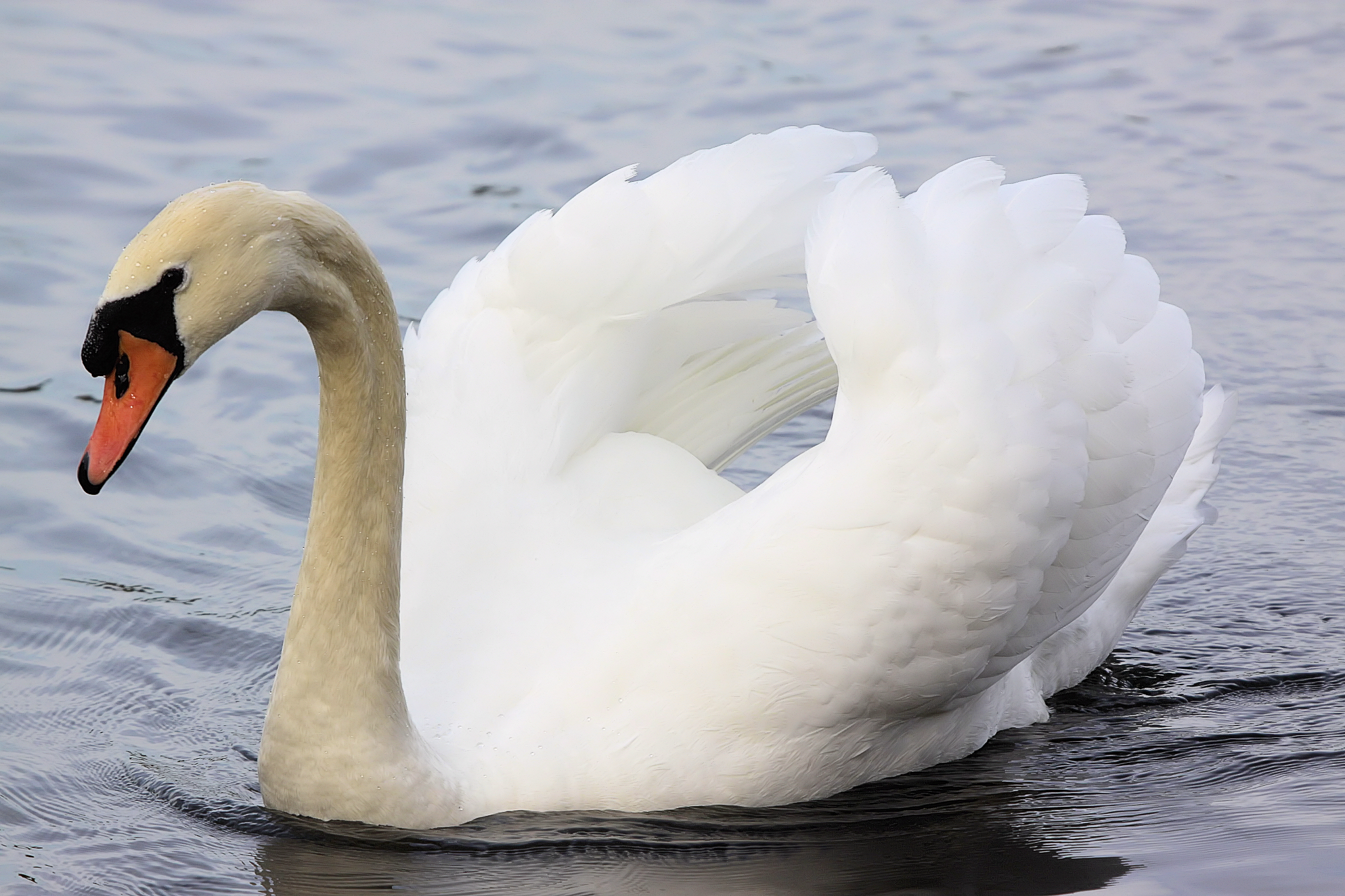
The swan is often referenced in literature as an example of a "graceful" animal.

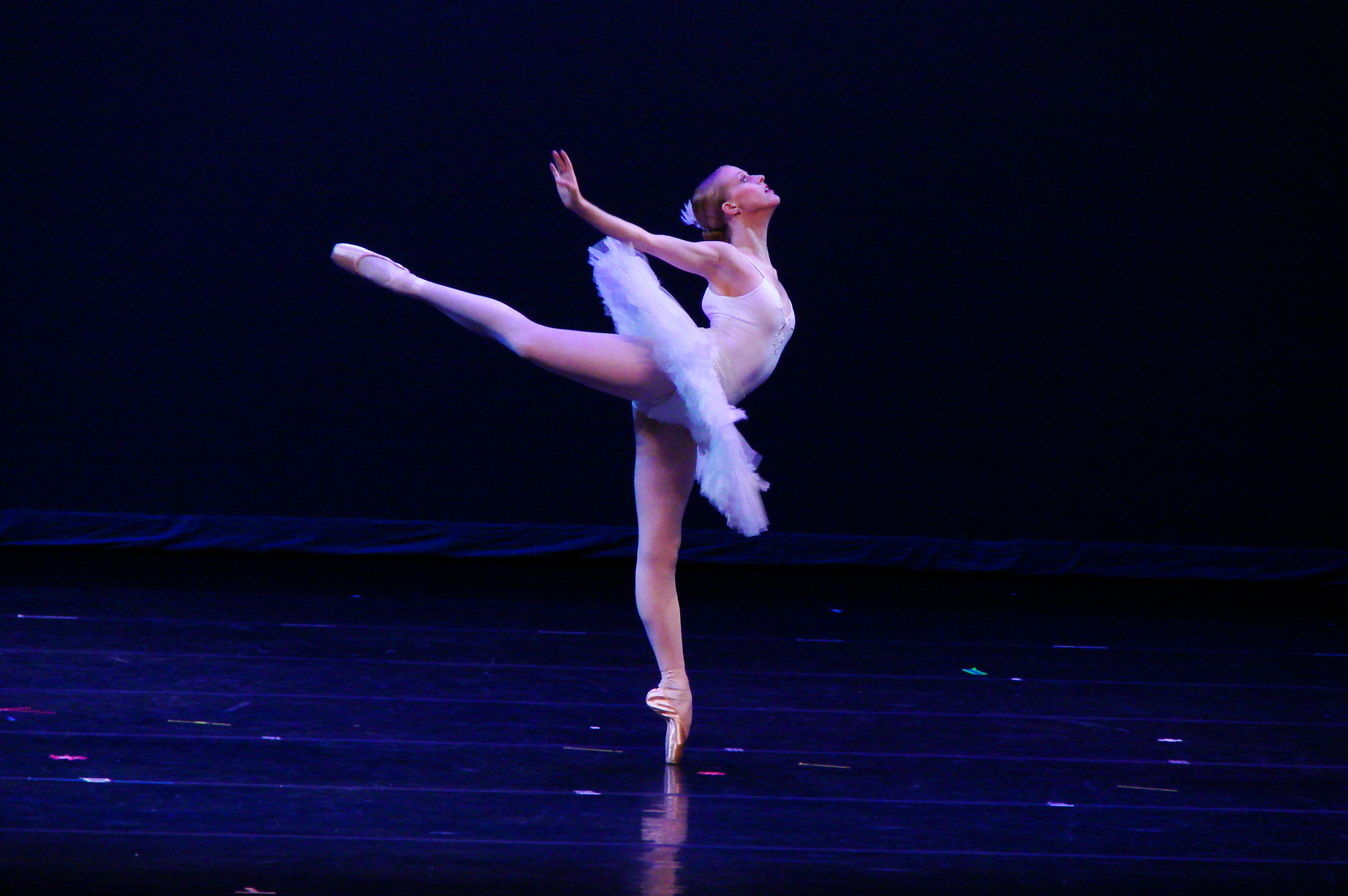
Like swans, ballerinas are often used as an examples of gracefulness.

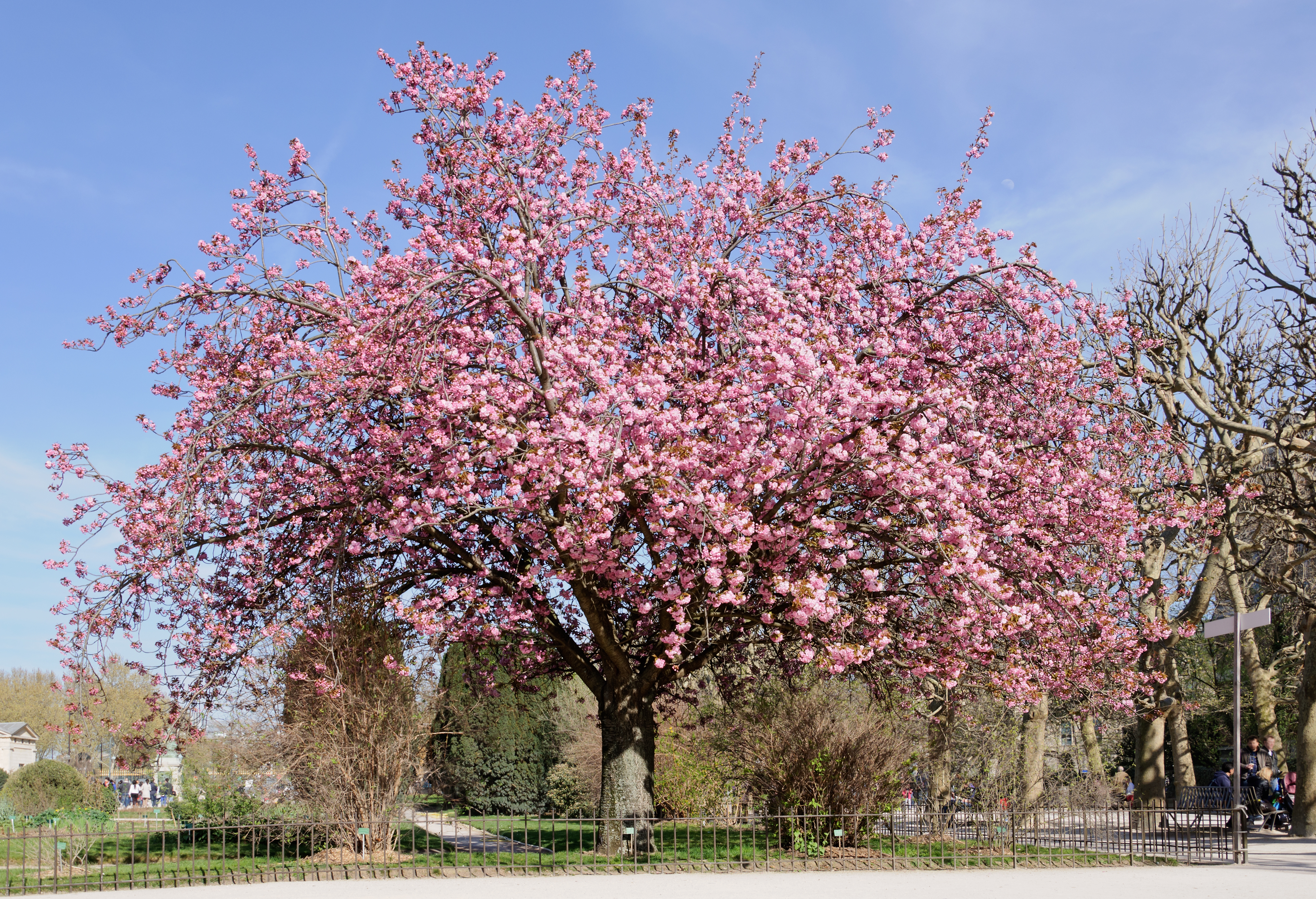
The "graceful" Japanese cherry tree.

Gracefulness, or being graceful, is the physical characteristic of displaying "pretty agility", in the form of elegant movement, poise, or balance. The etymological root of grace is the Latin word gratia from gratus, meaning pleasing. Gracefulness has been described by reference to its being aesthetically pleasing. For example:

Gracefulness is an idea not very different from beauty; it consists of much the same things. Gracefulness is an idea belonging to posture and motion. In both these, to be graceful, it is requisite that there be no appearance of difficulty; there is required a small inflection of the body; and a composure of the parts in such a manner, as not to encumber each other, not to appear divided by sharp and sudden angles. In this ease, this roundness, this delicacy of attitude and motion, it is that all the magic of grace consists, and what is called its je ne sais quoi; as will be obvious to any observer, who considers attentively the Venus de Medicis, the Antinous, or any statue generally allowed to be graceful in an high degree.

— Edmund Burke

The difficulty in defining exactly what constitutes gracefulness is described in this analysis of Henri Bergson's use of the term:

The organic form of drama is most clearly suggested in Bergson's use of the word 'gracefulness' [la grâce]. Gracefulness is not imposed from without but generated from within. Gracefulness is 'the immateriality which... passes into matter.' In this formulation, the soul, or what Bergson elsewhere calls the élan vital, the life force, shapes the matter that contains it. The soul is not immobilized by matter, as it is in comedy, but remains infinitely supple and perpetually in motion.

Gracefulness is often referenced by simile, for example with people being described as "graceful as a swan", or "as graceful as a ballerina". The concept of gracefulness is applied both to movement, and to inanimate objects. For example, certain trees are commonly referred to as being "graceful", such as the Betula albosinensis, Prunus × yedoensis (Yoshino cherry), and Areca catechu (betel-nut palm).

Gracefulness is sometimes also attributed to non-corporeal human actions, such as the use of language ("a graceful turn of phrase") or the control of emotion ("accepting defeat gracefully").

Gracefulness is sometimes confused with gracility, or slenderness, although the latter word is derived from a different root, the Latin adjective gracilis (masculine or feminine), or gracile (neuter) which in either form means slender, and when transferred for example to discourse, takes the sense of "without ornament", "simple", or various similar connotations. The Shorter Oxford English Dictionary remarks of gracility, for example: "Recently misused (through association with grace) for Gracefully slender." The terms gracile and grace are completely unrelated: the etymological root of grace is the Latin word gratia from gratus, meaning pleasing and has nothing to do with slenderness or thinness.

== See also ==
- Fine motor skill – Coordination of small muscles, particularly of the hands and fingers, with the eyes
- Grace (disambiguation)
- Kama – Concept of pleasure, enjoyment and desire in Hinduism, Buddhism, and Jainism
- Majesty – Address of monarchs
- Peak experiences – Concept in psychology
