= Grace =

Grace may refer to:

== Places ==
=== United States ===
- Grace, Idaho, a city
- Grace (CTA station), Chicago Transit Authority's Howard Line, Illinois
- Little Goose Creek (Kentucky), location of Grace post office
- Grace, Carroll County, Missouri, an unincorporated community
- Grace, Laclede County, Missouri, an unincorporated community
- Grace, Mississippi, an unincorporated community
- Grace, Montana, an unincorporated community
- Grace, Roane County, West Virginia

=== Elsewhere ===
- Grace (lunar crater), on the Moon
- Grace, a crater on Venus

== People with the name ==
- Grace (given name), a feminine name, including a list of people and fictional characters
- Grace (surname), including a list of people with the name

== Religion ==
=== Theory and practice ===
- Grace (meals), a prayer of thanksgiving said before or after a meal
- Divine grace, a theological term present in many religions
- Grace in Christianity, the benevolence shown by God toward humankind

=== Mythology ===
- Charites, figures in Greek mythology, known as Graces in Roman mythology

=== Institutions ===
- Grace Cathedral (disambiguation)
- Grace Church (disambiguation)
- Grace Bible College (disambiguation)
- Grace Christian College, Quezon City, Philippines
- Grace College & Seminary, Winona Lake, Indiana
- Grace University, Omaha, Nebraska

== Arts, entertainment, and media ==
=== Films ===
- Grace (2009 film), a 2009 horror film
- Grace (2014 film), a 2014 drama starring Annika Marks
- Grace (2018 film), a 2018 comedy

=== Literature ===
- "Grace" (short story), 1914, by James Joyce from Dubliners
- Grace (play), 2006, by Mick Gordon and A. C. Grayling
- Grace, 2008 play by Sophie Dingemans about Grace Oakeshott

=== Music ===
==== Albums and EPs ====
- Grace (Jeff Buckley album), 1994
- Grace (Ketil Bjørnstad album), 2001
- Grace (Simon Webbe album), 2006
- Grace (Mandy Capristo album), 2012
- Grace (Moses Mackay album), 2023
- Grace, by Wild Strawberries, 1991
- Grace, by Margaret Becker, 1995
- Grace, by Tribes of Neurot, 1999
- Grace by Lee Soo-young, 2006
- Grace by Grace Kelly, 2011
- Grace (EP), by DJ Haram, 2019

==== Songs ====
- "Grace" (Band AKA song), 1981
- "Grace" (Jim McCann song), 1985, about Grace Gifford
- "Grace" (Jeff Buckley song), 1994
- "Grace" (Supergrass song), 2002
- "Grace" (Apocalyptica song), 2007
- "Grace" (Miss Kittin song), 2008
- "Grace" (Simon Webbe song), 2007
- "Grace" (Phil Wickham song), 2006
- "Grace" (Will Young song), 2008
- "Grace" (Ed Kowalczyk song), 2010
- "Grace" (Lewis Capaldi song), 2018
- "Grace" (Lil Baby and 42 Dugg song), 2020
- "Grace" (Marcus Mumford song), 2022
- "Grace", 1967, by Country Joe and the Fish from Electric Music for the Mind and Body
- "Grace", 1981, by Sylvia St. James from Echoes & Images
- "Grace", 1998, by Robbie Williams from I've Been Expecting You
- "Grace", 1999, by Jars of Clay from If I Left the Zoo
- "Grace", 2008, by U2 from All That You Can't Leave Behind
- "Grace", 2008, by Parachute Band from Technicolour
- "Grace", 2009, by Lamb of God from Wrath
- "Grace", 2010, by The View from Bread and Circuses
- "Grace", 2011, by Nerina Pallot from Year of the Wolf
- "Grace", 2017, by Sevdaliza from ISON
- "Grace", 2018, by Bebe Rexha from Expectations
- "Grace", 2018, by Florence + the Machine from High as Hope
- "Grace", 2023, by Idles from Tangk
- "Grace", 2024, by Jelly Roll from Beautifully Broken
- "Grace (I Think I'm in Love Again)", 2022, by Bad Suns from Apocalypse Whenever

==== Other uses in music ====
- Grace (band), a 1990s dance music group
- Grace note, a kind of music notation
- The Grace (group), a South Korean girl group
- Saygrace (formerly Grace), an Australian singer

=== Television ===
- Grace (TV series), a 2021 British crime drama series
- "Grace" (Falling Skies), a 2011 episode of the science fiction drama Falling Skies
- "Grace" (Homeland), a 2011 episode of the TV series Homeland
- "Grace" (Skins), a 2011 episode of the UK TV series Skins
- "Grace" (Stargate SG-1), a 2004 episode of the TV series Stargate SG-1

=== Other uses in arts, entertainment, and media ===
- Grace (comics), a list of comics that use the name Grace
- Grace (photograph), the Minnesota state photograph
- Le Bénédicité (Grace), a painting by Jean-Baptiste-Siméon Chardin

== Brands and enterprises ==
- Grace (company), a US–based chemical conglomerate
- Grace (food company), the brand name for Grace Kennedy Limited, a Caribbean food company
- Grace (restaurant), in Chicago, Illinois
- Grace Bio-Labs, supplier of pharmaceutical, biomedical, and biochemical research products, Bend, Oregon, U.S.

== Organizations ==
- Godly Response to Abuse in the Christian Environment, a Virginia organization formed to assist evangelical groups in confronting sexual abuse
- Grass Roots Art and Community Effort, American non-profit organization

== Transportation ==
- Grace (1811 ship), destroyed by fire in Struys Bay, South Africa in 1822
- Aichi B7A, a World War II Japanese bomber aircraft (American codename "Grace")
- Honda Grace, Japanese name for the Honda City, a compact car
- Hyundai Grace, a minivan built by Hyundai Motor Company
- MV Grace, a Panamanian coastal tanker, launched 1941
- Grace 1, an Iranian oil tanker seized by the UK off Gibraltar during the 2019–20 Persian Gulf crisis
- Crew Dragon Grace (C213), a Dragon 2 Crew Dragon space capsule built by SpaceX, first launched 2025

== Other uses ==
- Grace Gates, at Lord's Cricket Ground in London, England, UK
- Grace (plotting tool), software
- Grace (style), a form of address
- GRACE and GRACE-FO, space missions
- Grace period, extra time to fulfill an obligation
- Nvidia Grace, codename for a datacenter/server class CPU from Nvidia
- Tropical Storm Grace, storms assigned the name Grace
- Game of graces, 19c French game mainly for young women

== See also ==
- Grace Academy (disambiguation)
- Grace Hospital (disambiguation)
- Gracey (disambiguation)
- Gracie (disambiguation)
- The Grace (disambiguation), includes The Graces
