= WBNX-TV =

Television station in Akron, Ohio

ATSC 3.0 station

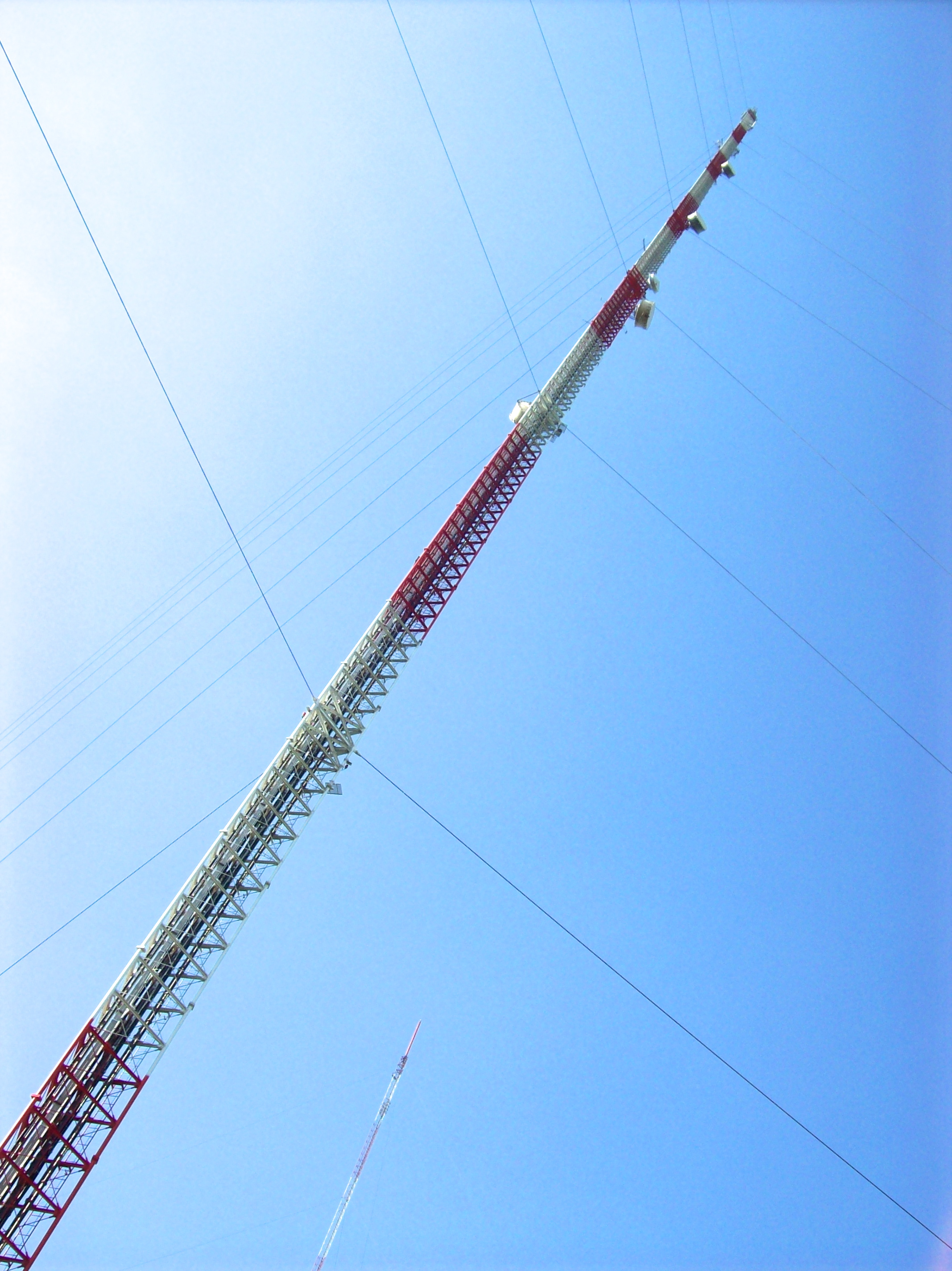
- WBNX's broadcast tower in Parma, Ohio, now used for ATSC 3.0 transmissions
- Akron–Cleveland, Ohio; United States
- City: Akron, Ohio
- Channels: Digital: 17 (UHF); Virtual: 55
- Branding: CW 55

Programming
- Affiliations: 55.1: The CW; for others, see § Technical information and subchannels

Ownership
- Owner: Nexstar Media Group; (Nexstar Media Inc.)
- Sister stations: WJW; Tegna: WKYC

History
- Founded: January 30, 1984
- First air date: December 1, 1985
- Former channel numbers: Analog: 55 (UHF, 1985–2009); Digital: 30 (UHF, 2007–2019)
- Former affiliations: Independent (1985–1997, 2018–2025); Fox Kids (secondary, 1994–2002); FoxBox/4KidsTV (secondary, 2002–2008); The WB (1997–2006); The CW (2006–2018)
- Call sign meaning: "Winston Broadcasting Network"

Technical information
- Licensing authority: FCC
- Facility ID: 72958
- ERP: 505 kW
- HAAT: 357.4 m (1,173 ft)
- Transmitter coordinates: 41°23′2″N 81°41′43″W

Links
- Public license information: Public file; LMS
- Website: fox8.com/cw55/

WBNX-TV (channel 55) is a television station licensed to Akron, Ohio, United States, serving as the Cleveland market's outlet for The CW. It is owned by Nexstar Media Group alongside Fox affiliate WJW (channel 8); Nexstar's Tegna subsidiary owns NBC affiliate WKYC (channel 3). WBNX-TV and WJW share studios on Dick Goddard Way northeast of downtown Cleveland; WBNX-TV's transmitter is located in suburban Parma, Ohio.

Interest for the channel 55 frequency in Akron dates back to 1968, when televangelist Rex Humbard obtained a permit for which he sought to operate "WCOT-TV" as an extension of his Cathedral of Tomorrow ministry. Despite lofty plans, which included a proposed concrete tower intended to house his station's studios and transmitter mast, the tower was not finished, his station was never built, and the permit was deleted. Another bidding process for a channel 55 license began in 1980 and was awarded to Akron-Rhema Television, but after Akron-Rhema ran out of money during construction, Ernest Angley agreed to operate the station using Humbard's former television studios, which Angley had previously acquired.

Signing on as independent WBNX on December 1, 1985, Angley purchased the station outright in early 1987 under the "Winston Broadcasting Network" name and operated it as a for-profit arm of his ministry. WBNX originally featured a mixture of classic sitcoms, movies, and Angley's religious programs, then picked up Fox Kids in 1994, The WB in 1997, and The CW in 2006. The CW disaffiliated from WBNX in 2018 amidst various financial issues and personal allegations made against Angley, who died in 2021. Sold to WJW owner Nexstar in early 2025, WBNX reclaimed the CW affiliation and added local newscasts produced by WJW. WBNX converted to broadcasting with the ATSC 3.0 standard in July 2026.

== Prior history of channel 55 in Akron ==
In March 1951, the Federal Communications Commission (FCC), in the middle of a self-imposed freeze on issuing television licenses while studying future ultra high frequency (UHF) channel allocations, proposed three new UHF channels for Akron, Ohio: channels 49, 55, and 61, with channel 55 designated for non-commercial educational television (ETV) usage. Channel 49 was the first to be used when WAKR-TV signed on in 1953, but the proposed ETV channel was tied up in an impasse between Akron University and Kent State University. The FCC reassigned the channel 55 allocation to commercial use on August 1, 1966, after granting WAKR-TV's petition to move channels from 49 to 23; in the process, the channel 49 allocation took the ETV designation.

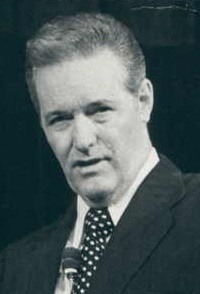
Rex Humbard

Rex Humbard, a televangelist headquartered in Cuyahoga Falls at the Cathedral of Tomorrow complex, filed paperwork with the FCC in May 1967 to operate a station on channel 55. Humbard and his family settled in Akron full-time in 1952, and began using television the following year, holding a timeslot on WAKR-TV when it launched; his ministry was originally located in a former movie theater, which was sold to WAKR for TV and radio studios. Humbard was not a stranger to the application process, having previously applied for a radio station in Massillon, Ohio. The FCC awarded Humbard the permit in June 1968, which was assigned the WCOT-TV call sign; plans for WCOT included a heavy emphasis on religious programs in prime time and live hoedown dances, along with a January 1969 sign-on. The launch was delayed until the fall of 1969, with Humbard's son, Rex Humbard Jr., now overseeing WCOT-TV.

While no tangible progress was made on the station, Humbard filed paperwork in April 1970 to adjust WCOT-TV's antenna height to 715 feet (218 m) and power output to over 1 million watts. A former Shoppers Fair building next to the Cathedral was renovated into a buffet restaurant and television studio, with an above-ground walkway constructed between it and the Cathedral. The building would also house WCOT's studios. Cuyahoga Falls City Council agreed in August 1970 to upgrade the substation servicing the Cathedral to accommodate WCOT-TV and any additional development. Humbard Jr. promised a September 1971 sign-on to Bill Barrett of the Cleveland Press, saying WCOT would feature "... lots of good clean entertainment, no shoddy movies".

Inspired by the design of Husky Oil's headquarters in Calgary, Alberta, Humbard filed paperwork with Northampton Township's zoning board in May 1971 (Note: Northampton Township merged into Cuyahoga Falls in 1986.) to construct a 750-foot (229 m) concrete tower, including a revolving restaurant, television studio and observation deck, along with a cross-shaped transmitter mast for WCOT-TV; if completed, the structure would have been the tallest in Ohio. The design was likened by Press columnist Harriett Peters to Caesars Palace and had an estimated cost of $4 million. Earlier in the year, Humbard purchased the former Mackinac College by taking out a $2 million loan. While Humbard previously associated with the Teamsters for lending purposes, including for the Shoppers Fair renovations and walkway construction, he had satisfactory credit with area banks, with one bank providing $750,000 in startup money.

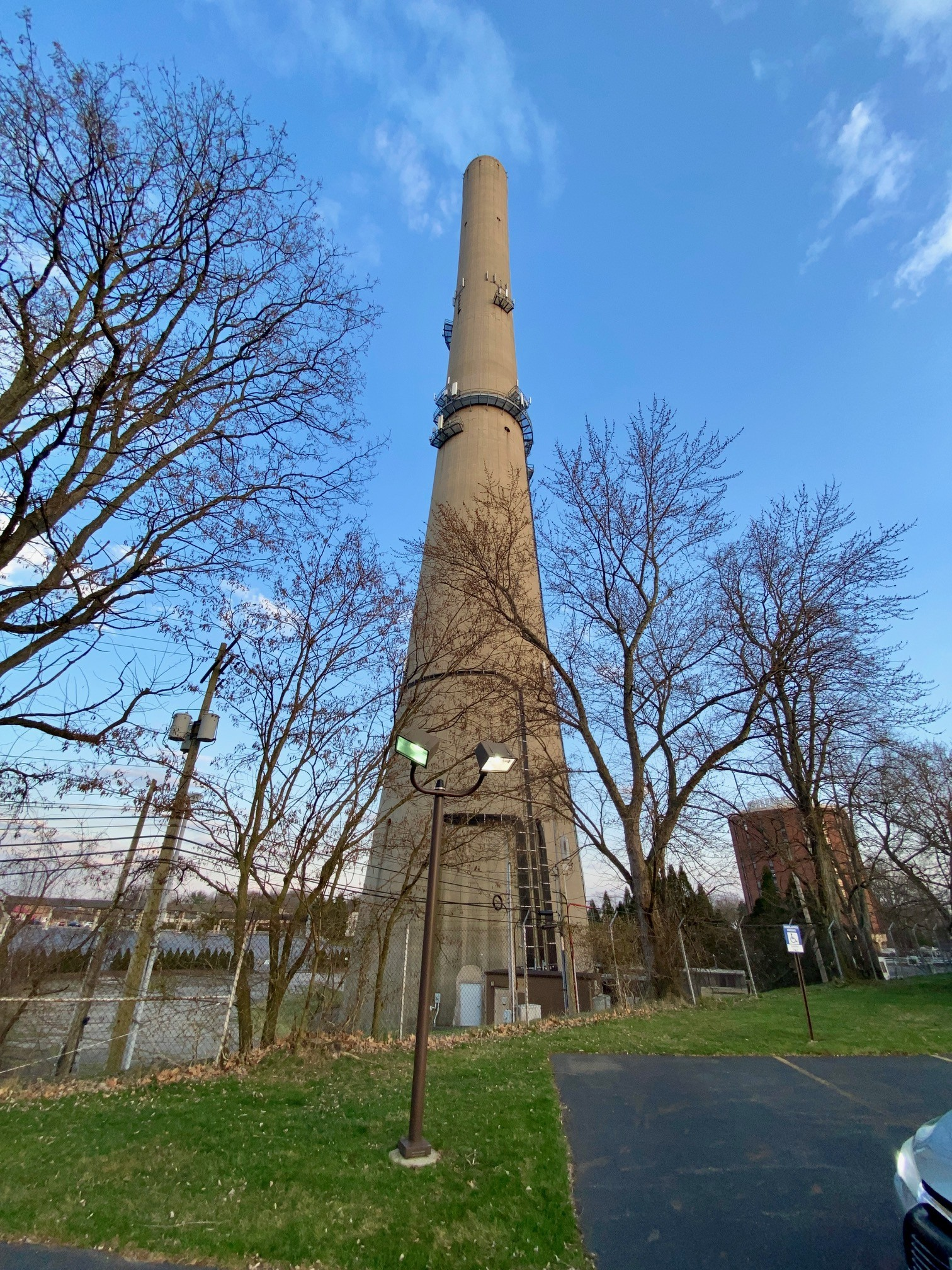
This unfinished concrete tower was originally intended to house both WCOT-TV's studios and transmitter mast.

Groundbreaking for the tower took place in September 1971 despite an injunction filed by an area resident. WSLR radio also sued to halt construction under concerns that their broadcast signal would be adversely affected in Akron; the suit was dismissed. A delay in construction took place during WSLR's court filing, mostly for adjustments to the antenna design. Humbard's television studio, dubbed "Cathedral Teleproductions", was completed and opened to the public in November 1971, with executives comparing it favorably to NBC's Burbank studios as among the best in the country. Despite this, Northampton Township noted the tower was not connected to water or sewer lines.

Only 494 feet (151 m) of the tower was erected during a 22-day span in November 1971 that included 19 million pounds (8.6 million kilograms) of reinforced concrete, managed by the M. W. Kellogg company. Cathedral staffers at this time promised a June 1, 1972, sign-on for WCOT-TV. Construction was halted in January 1972 and never resumed. While Cleveland-based Northern Ohio Bank agreed to provide a $5 million loan to Humbard for the tower, they did so under the stipulation that all financing be secured beforehand, but Humbard ordered construction to begin anyway; this forced the contractors to take out promissory notes from the Cathedral to be paid. Despite this, Humbard promised the tower would be finished in 90 days and WCOT-TV would sign on at the end of 1972. After a decade of cease and desist warnings by the state, Ohio Director of Commerce Dennis Shaul ordered in January 1973 a halt to all securities sales by the Cathedral, and along with the U.S. Securities and Exchange Commission, jointly sued Humbard the following month, alleging the church was insolvent. The lawsuit forced the closure of Humbard's studio to all outside clients, with 40 people losing their jobs. The Cathedral was placed under state supervision with all assets frozen pending a plan to pay off $12.5 million in outstanding investments.

The FCC canceled the permit for WCOT-TV on August 27, 1976, due to its failure to be constructed over an eight-year span. This allowed WVIZ to sign on their Chagrin Falls translator over channel 55, which was activated the following year. M. W. Kellogg was not completely paid for their work on the tower until 1989, when the company sued Humbard for fraud. The unfinished concrete tower—derisively nicknamed "Rex's Erection" among local residents—was sold off in 1989 to Mike Krieger, an area businessman and grocer who initially considered completing it. Still in Krieger's ownership, the tower has since been used largely for cellular phone transmissions.

== History ==
=== Application and initial construction ===
After canceling Humbard's WCOT-TV permit, the FCC reopened the bidding process for the channel 55 frequency in Akron. Four different groups—Rhema Television, Ebony Blackstar, Akron Telecasting Corp., and Ohio Telecasting Corp.—all filed applications between May and August 1980. Rhema, Greek for "the spoken word of God", intended to operate a full-time religious station, was composed of area clergy, laymen, and ministers, and was headed by a former Humbard associate. One of Rhema's principals, the Rev. Amer Shab, was a Born Again Christian who operated a Bible college, church, and retreat center in North Ridgeville, situated on the Ohio Turnpike between New York and Chicago. Ebony Blackstar was minority-controlled and planned to program for a Black audience, while Akron Telecasting's backers held a minority stake in Pittsburgh station WPGH-TV and sought a general independent format similar to WUAB, along with local news. Ohio Telecasting and Ebony Blackstar also included subscription television in their respective proposals, similar to existing independent/subscription hybrid WCLQ.

Summit Radio, the parent company of WAKR-TV, filed petitions with the FCC objecting to Rhema and Ohio Telecasting; while not explicitly stated, David Bianculli of the Akron Beacon Journal suggested Summit's opposition was due to WAKR-TV heavily featuring religious programming. Akron Telecasting and Rhema consolidated their bids to form Akron-Rhema and were awarded the permit by the FCC. Akron-Rhema's plans were ambitious: a local morning show aimed at housewives, local music shows and a quiz show alongside reruns of family-oriented programs. With only one full-time employee, their treasurer, Akron-Rhema planned to launch the station in early 1984, but by August 1983 had raised only $100,000 of the $500,000 needed for startup, while first-year expenses were estimated at $5 million. By the start of 1985, Akron-Rhema exhausted their operating funds completely.

=== Signing on under Ernest Angley management ===
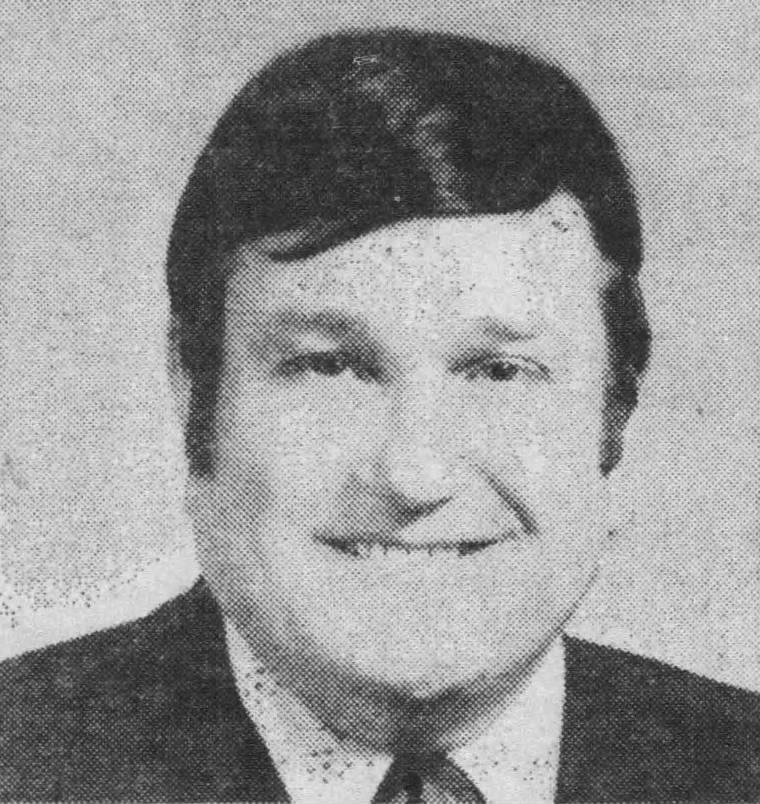
Ernest Angley

Lacking the financial resources and facilities to operate the station, Akron-Rhema entered into a contractual agreement with Ernest Angley in December 1984 to provide both. Angley was no stranger to television: like Humbard, he had hosted programs at WAKR-TV as early as 1957, but started a weekly program in 1973 after claiming to be told to do by divine intervention. Gaining a reputation as a faith healer and a "Bible Belt Liberace", Angley's speech patterns were mimicked and parodied by comedians such as Robin Williams. Angley purchased much of the Cathedral's assets in early 1984, including Humbard's television studio, for $2 million, and announced the launch of a daily program on WDLI-TV weeks after Humbard's shows ended production. The nature of the purchase led the Beacon Journal to later state Angley "inherited" Humbard's ministry. The "WPSC" call sign assigned to the permit was changed to WBNX upon Akron-Rhema's request, but no reason was provided. A transmitter site was secured on the WWWE/WZAK tower in Brecksville; during the antenna's installation process, WWWE operated at reduced power from a backup tower.

Original logo for WBNX-TV.

Lou Spangler, executive director of Angley's ministry, was appointed to WBNX's programming board. Angley and Spangler were given full control over programming and refocused WBNX to have a mixture of family-friendly reruns, movies and Angley's daily show, The Ninety and Nine Club, much in the mold of the Christian Broadcasting Network. Spangler told the Beacon Journal that WBNX would launch "certainly ... by the end of the year [1985]", but the station's viability was placed in doubt weeks prior to launch. The U.S. Supreme Court affirmed a lower court ruling that overturned the FCC's must-carry rule, prompting area cable companies to decline to carry WBNX, owing to its niche format. While the FCC reinstituted must-carry, the new rules were more lenient to cable systems. Spangler said, "we'll court [the cable companies] just like you'd court a lovely young lady you wanted", but none of the 20 cable systems that served Akron, including Warner Cable, agreed to pick up WBNX when the station took to the air on December 1, 1985.

Angley incorporated "Winston Broadcasting Network" in May 1986, Winston being Angley's middle name. This was a precursor to Angley's Grace Cathedral buying the license outright from Akron-Rhema in January 1987. The purchase price for WBNX was $1.2 million, and according to Angley was a purchase made through divine intervention, saying, "I depend on God in all the businesses I transact ... He is a good businessman". WBNX, along with the Cathedral Buffet, which Angley purchased in 1986, were operated as for-profit entities within the ministry, and all profits were directed back to the ministry. WBNX began to be carried on Warner Cable in April 1986, and by 1989, was on four other systems in Akron; the station continued to lobby for further clearances, particularly on cable systems in rural areas. Angley purchased the remainder of Humbard's Cathedral complex, including the domed church, in March 1994 for $2.7 million.

The station continued to explore options for a transmitter site closer to Cleveland; Angley claimed divine intervention suggested an improved signal would enable WBNX to be profitable enough to support the ministry. Angley used The Ninety and Nine Club to make on-air appeals for donations to help finance such a tower and its construction. In March 1989, the station proposed a lease agreement with the Richfield–Hinckley Parks Board that would include the construction of a 1,200-foot (370 m) tower in Rising Valley Park, which bordered the two towns; this was opposed by the park board's trustees. In 1992, following a two-year siting search, WBNX leased 32 acres (13 ha) of land in Parma next to the city's former landfill—now the site of the Cleveland Metroparks West Creek Reservation—for a 1,100-foot (340 m) tower. The clearing of 12 acres (4.9 ha) for the tower was contested in court when an adjacent property owner claimed the land was deeded for park or greenspace usage, and the property's former owners also sued Winston Broadcasting. The Parma tower was completed and activated in July 1993.

=== Adding Fox Kids and increased visibility ===
On May 23, 1994, WJW-TV owner New World Communications entered into a groupwide long-term affiliation deal with Fox, displacing charter Fox affiliate WOIO in the process. WOIO agreed to affiliate with CBS in a two-station exchange; in doing so, WOIO planned to drop Fox Kids, which was operated separately from Fox and which WJW declined to pick up. WBNX agreed to carry Fox Kids on September 1, 1994, two days before WJW and WOIO were to switch networks; WBNX program director Anne Keith called the move "a mountaintop leap ... we become a real player in Cleveland". Unlike WOIO, who had a staff member in a fox costume named Rocky Rox, the Kids Club Fox due to their lack of on-air talent, WBNX salesperson Patti (last name was not disclosed for privacy reasons) became an in-studio continuity host. Membership in the Fox 55 Kids Club increased from 91,000 to 110,000 within the first three weeks, to 125,000 by June 1995, and to 130,000 by April 1996, becoming the fourth-largest Fox Kids club in the country.

WOIO's switch to CBS came at the same time they took over WUAB via a local marketing agreement, this resulted in WOIO's syndicated programming being consolidated at WUAB and WBNX picking up surplus programming from both stations. WBNX began rebroadcasting WJW's 10 p.m. news at 11 p.m. in December 1995 via tape delay; the move was largely precipitated by WJW reserving the 11 p.m. time slot in the event Fox launched a late-night talk show. The station also entered into an agreement with Media Marketing, a group largely consisting of former WUAB marketing staffers, to assist in station promotions and marketing as a "leased management team". As WUAB contracted with both UPN and The WB at the start of 1995, WBNX started billing themselves as a "pure independent". While WBNX still ranked near the bottom in prime time and "sign-on to sign-off" ratings among area competition, the station's ratings increased by 300 percent in mornings and by 17 percent in afternoons, and equaled or surpassed WUAB in the 2–11 demo.

Angley's ownership remained an influence over the station: in one instance, the station declined to air one episode of The Best of National Geographic, "Mysteries of Mankind", for discussing evolution. The station also acquired Baywatch Nights, among other first-run programs, for the 1995–96 season; acknowledging the show's potential conflict with WBNX's "family image", Keith said, "at least it will be indoors as opposed to the beach" and "we have the editing rights [to all syndicated shows] in our contracts". Baywatch Nights was later dropped from the schedule after the show drifted into occult and paranormal storylines. Along with further programming upgrades for the 1996–97 season, WBNX launched a website on September 9, 1996, becoming the first television station in the area to do so. By July 1997, WBNX was still the only Cleveland area station with a website.

=== Pairing with The WB, then The CW ===
We like the 'WB' in their name, but we'll see if it's a good match. They want to be a family friendly station, and our philosophies mix very well.

— Brad Turell, The WB spokesman, on negotiations between the network and WBNX-TV in May 1997

WUAB arranged to carry both UPN in September 1993 and The WB in January 1995, which was possible as both networks programmed limited schedules when they concurrently launched. UPN was from the outset WUAB's primary affiliation, and took priority over The WB in prime time. Both networks began phased expansion of prime time hours in the fall of 1995; this, combined with WUAB airing both Cleveland Indians and Cavaliers games, resulted in shows from both networks airing out of pattern, and WB shows airing in late night or on the weekends. Between November 1995 and November 1996, WUAB's ratings increased by 75 percent with UPN shows and decreased by 33 percent with WB programming. When The WB announced a third night of prime time, WUAB management suggested The WB could become "a weekend network". By May 1997, WUAB extended their UPN affiliation to 2004 and allowed The WB to opt out of their contract, owing to concerns from WB executives and following extensive research taken by WUAB on the two networks. WBNX-TV was rumored as a future WB affiliate, (Note: WBNX had also been rumored as a WB affiliate in 1993, when the network was formed.) and network spokesman Brad Turell confirmed negotiations were already underway with the station.

WBNX signed a four-year affiliation contract with The WB on July 1, 1997, effective September 1; prime time programming would air in pattern, but the Saturday morning Kids' WB lineup would air on Sunday mornings to accommodate the Saturday Fox Kids lineup. Bob Dyer of the Beacon Journal satirized Angley's ownership of WBNX and the station's "family-friendly" image by suggesting Sister, Sister could be recast with Amish and renamed "Prairie Cheeses", and Tom Arnold be cast in a St. Elsewhere–type show titled "St. Jude". Angley's show The Ninety and Nine Club continued to air over WBNX weekdays at 9 a.m. and 10 p.m., the latter airing with teen-oriented shows like Charmed and Dawson's Creek acting as lead-ins. While WBNX still had rights to censor syndicated programming for profanities or objectionable words, this did not extend to WB programming. Buffy the Vampire Slayer aired over WBNX despite the show's themes, which like Charmed, clashed with Angley's ministry ownership; general manager Lou Spangler said, "I don't like Buffy personally, but it wasn't designed for me to watch ... and they handle it pretty well".

WBNX carried fifteen regular season Akron Aeros minor league baseball games for the 1997 season, the team's first in Akron, as well as the 1998 season. The station also added The Ghoul (portrayed by horror host Ron Sweed) in July 1998 for Friday late nights, returning Sweed to local television for the first time since 1984. Given full control over the show's content, Sweed joked, "I'd like to have a celebrity steel cage death match between [Ghoul stock character] Froggy and [The WB mascot] Michigan J. Frog". Originally airing directly against WJW's Big Chuck and Lil' John, The Ghoul was moved to Sunday late nights by October 2000. By 2000, WBNX swapped the weekend lineups for Kids' WB and Fox Kids, with Kids' WB on Saturday mornings and Fox Kids on Sundays; WBNX also carried programming from 4Kids TV after it supplanted Fox Kids, airing the block on Sunday mornings.

On January 24, 2006, UPN and The WB jointly announced the dissolution of both networks and launch of The CW. The new network planned to "cherry pick" among UPN or WB affiliates in Cleveland and other markets without a CBS-owned UPN station or a Tribune-owned WB affiliate (the network's charter affiliates). WUAB was rumored to land The CW, but still featured Cavaliers games in prime time, opening up the possibility of preemptions; WUAB general manager Bill Applegate was also ambivalent on The CW's economic model and questioned if the network would pay compensation to affiliates. By contrast, Spangler considered The CW "an excellent plan". The CW chose WBNX as their Cleveland affiliate on March 1, becoming one of the network's first five outside affiliates. Spangler attributed the station's strong ratings performance with The WB as the determining factor; along with the switch, WBNX began airing Friends reruns in evenings, replacing the evening airing of Ninety and Nine. WUAB subsequently affiliated with MyNetworkTV.

=== Allegations against Angley, financial issues, and CW disaffiliation ===
The Beacon Journal published a six-part series on Angley and the Cathedral in October 2014. In it, multiple former members described cult behavior by Angley and the church, along with sexual abuse in the Cathedral by Angley associates, while Angley was either dismissive or engaged in coarse, explicit language; another former member said Angley conducted a forced marriage with someone later revealed to be a sex offender. Steve Nelson, WBNX's chief engineer for 16 years, left the station after learning of Angley molesting a church member. Angley persuaded members to have abortions or vasectomies, and purportedly inspected male parishioners pre- and post-surgery. Former members accused Angley of advising parishioners to shun anyone who left his church, claiming they were possessed by "dark angels" or "demons". Brock Miller, a former associate pastor, left the Cathedral earlier in 2014 and was publicly assailed by Angley and other church members, while he claimed his departure followed years of being violated by Angley. Angley was accused of having homosexual tendencies, which he denied in an interview with the Beacon.

Pay checks alternated each week, one pay from the buffet — 40 hours at $4.25 per hour — then the next week one pay from the church — 40 hours at $4.25 per hour. I was never issued any pay for any work done at WBNX.

— Greg Mulkey, former Cathedral member and volunteer

Volunteers were revealed to typically work for the ministry, the Buffet and WBNX, but because they were for-profit entities, minimum wage was paid and only for a fraction of work performed; WBNX workers were instructed to clock out promptly at 5 p.m., and return to their desks if work was unfinished. One former volunteer claimed to work for 18 hours a day, seven days a week, and another staffer was directed to destroy timecards prior to a 1999 audit. Such practices took place while Angley frequently flew in a custom Boeing 747 valued at $26 million for missionary trips, with annual expenses of $2.16 million. The U.S. Department of Labor sued Angley for violating the Fair Labor Standards Act of 1938, and a federal judge ordered payment of over $388,000 in unpaid wages and damages. Angley closed the Buffet on April 18, 2017, claiming it never made a profit, but was unsustainable without volunteers. While Angley won on appeal, the Buffet never reopened.

Beck Energy, which operated an oil well on the Cathedral's property, sued both Grace Cathedral and Winston Broadcasting on November 27, 2017. The lawsuit claimed default on a three-year, $3.6 million loan Angley took to pay off a remaining balance with PNC Bank, but failed to pay the loan off despite Beck granting him a one-year extension. Beck, which now held the mortgage over the Cathedral's entire six-acre (2.4 ha) property, sought foreclosure. WBNX's studios and the former Buffet building were placed for sale in a sheriff's auction to satisfy the outstanding money owed to Beck Energy; Angley paid off the loan on June 6, 2019, days before the auction was to take place.

WBNX logo after CW disaffiliation

On July 11, 2018, The CW announced that the network would move its Cleveland affiliation to WUAB five days later, on July 16. CW executives gave no reason for the switch, but stated the network had successful affiliations on other stations owned by WUAB parent Raycom Media. One month later, Brock Miller sued Angley, seeking damages, back wages, and a position at the Cathedral. Earlier in the year, Miller alleged in a Beacon Journal interview that Angley subjected him to sexual abuse, harassment and molestation, and was forced out of his house, which the Cathedral owned, after leaving the church. Angley countersued, claiming defamation; both lawsuits were settled though arbitration in February 2020. Angley retired from preaching in February 2019 after finding himself unable to finish a sermon, handing responsibilities over to his associate pastors.

Angley died on May 7, 2021, at the age of 99. Angley did not have a succession plan for the ministry or WBNX by extension, claiming "that's in the hands of the Lord... I'm planning on the Rapture".

=== Purchase by Nexstar and return of The CW ===
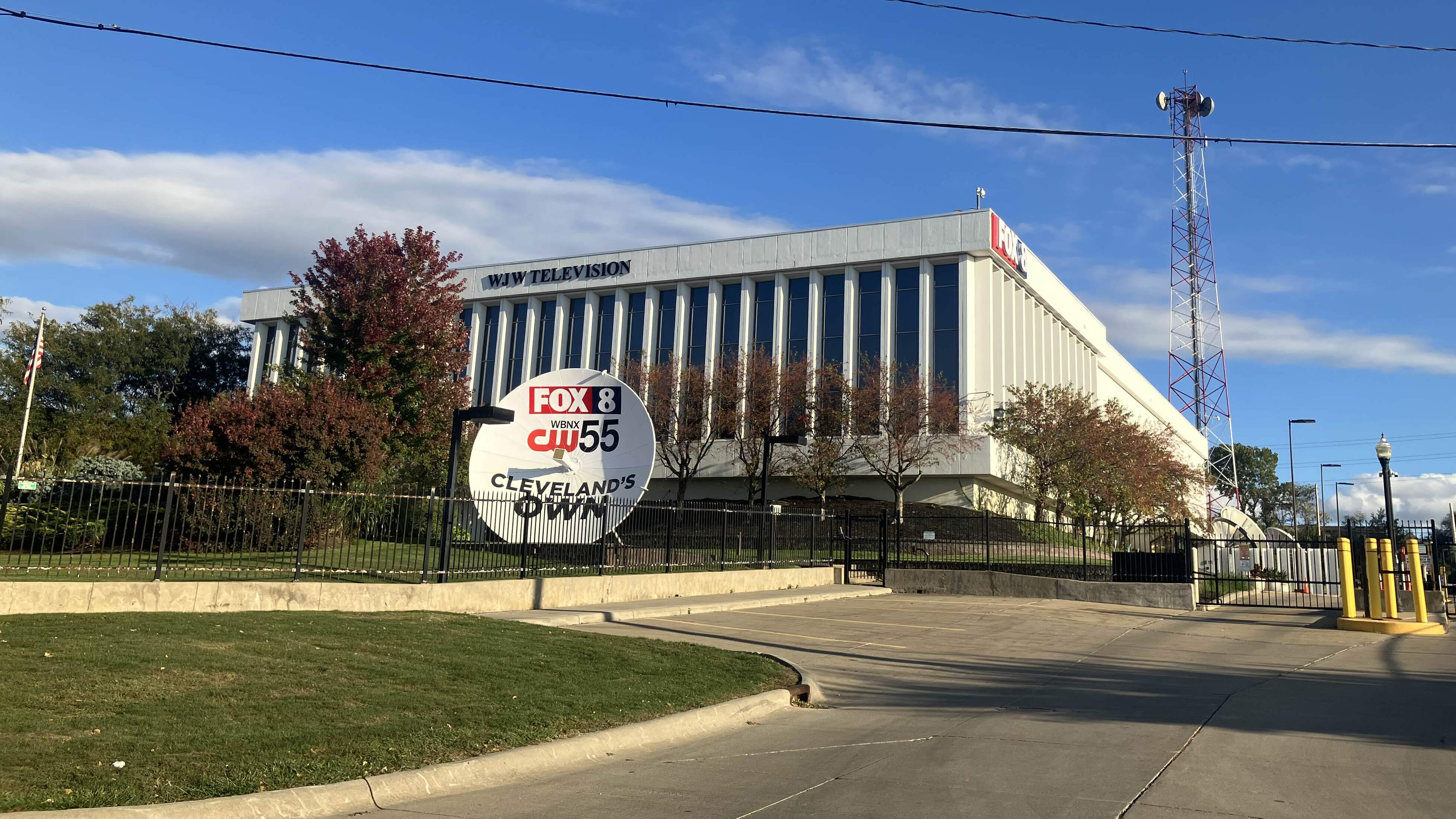
WBNX's studios, located on Dick Goddard Way near downtown Cleveland

Nexstar Media Group, which acquired WJW in 2019 and attained majority ownership of The CW in 2022, announced its purchase of WBNX from Winston Broadcasting on October 28, 2024, for $22 million. Nexstar also announced WBNX would become a CW owned-and-operated station on September 1, 2025, replacing WUAB. The sale was completed on February 1, 2025. In addition, WBNX-TV debuted a nightly 11 p.m. newscast produced by WJW, and began repeating WJW's infotainment talk show New Day Cleveland in the early afternoon.

Nexstar announced its purchase of WKYC owner Tegna Inc. on August 19, 2025, for $6.2 billion. The deal was finalized on March 19, 2026, after the FCC's Media Bureau allowed Nexstar to own more than two full-power television station licenses in markets such as Cleveland. A temporary restraining order issued one week later by the U.S. District Court for the Eastern District of California, later escalated to a preliminary injunction, has prevented WKYC from being integrated into WJW and WBNX.

== Notable alumni ==
- Dagmar Midcap

== Technical information and subchannels ==
The station's ATSC 1.0 subchannels are carried on the multiplexed signals of other Cleveland-Akron television stations:

Subchannels provided by WBNX-TV (ATSC 1.0)
Subchannel	Res.	Short name	Programming	ATSC 1.0 host
55.1	1080i	WBNX-HD	The CW	WJW
55.2	480i	BUZZR	Buzzr	WVPX-TV
55.3	480i	REWIND	Rewind TV	WEWS-TV
55.4	480i	HEROES	Heroes & Icons	WEWS-TV
55.5	480i	START	Start TV	WKYC

=== Analog-to-digital conversion ===
WBNX began digital broadcasts in April 2007 on UHF channel 30; due to Cleveland's proximity to the Canada–United States border, the station required approval from both the FCC and CRTC, a process that took over 3 1/2 years. WBNX's analog signal was shut down on June 12, 2009, as part of the transition from analog to digital television; the station's digital signal remained on its pre-transition channel 30, using virtual channel 55. WBNX relocated its signal from channel 30 to channel 17 on August 2, 2019, as a result of the 2016 United States wireless spectrum auction.

=== ATSC 3.0 ===
WBNX-TV's transmitter is located in Parma, Ohio. The station converted to the ATSC 3.0 (NextGen TV) standard on July 22, 2026, providing the main feeds of five TV stations in the format. It was originally supposed to launch on April 30, but was delayed to May 20 because the FCC did not approve WBNX's NextGen application in time. On May 26, 2026, six days after the launch was supposed to occur, it was delayed again to July 22 due to the same cause. Cleveland was the last remaining Top 25 designated market area to not have a television station broadcast in ATSC 3.0.

Subchannels of WBNX (ATSC 3.0)
Subchannel	Res.	Short name	Programming
3.1	1080p	WKYC-NG	NBC (WKYC)
5.1	1080p	WEWS-NG	ABC (WEWS-TV)
8.1	1080p	WJW-NG	Fox (WJW)
19.1	1080p	WOIO-NG	CBS (WOIO)
55.1	1080p	WBNX-NG	The CW (WBNX-TV)

Subchannel broadcast with digital rights management
