= Ernest Angley =

American Christian evangelist (1921–2021)

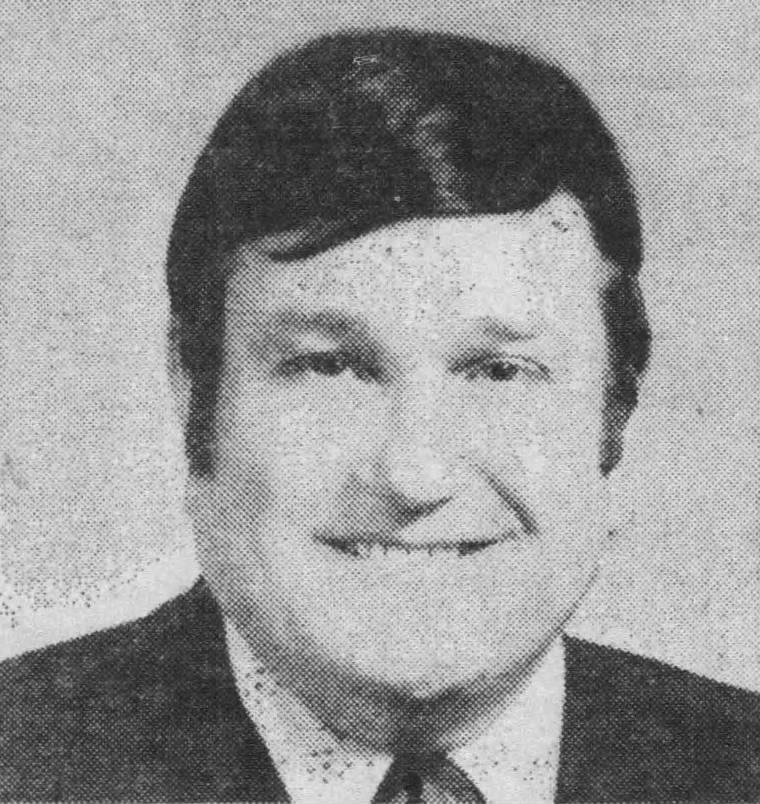
- Born: Ernest Winston Angley; August 9, 1921; Mooresville, North Carolina, U.S.
- Died: May 7, 2021 (aged 99); Akron, Ohio, U.S.
- Occupations: Pastor; televangelist; ministry owner; author; television station owner
- Spouse: Esther Lee Sikes (m. 1943; died 1970)
- Church: Ernest Angley's Grace Cathedral – Cuyahoga Falls; Grace Cathedral – Akron
- Congregations served: Grace Cathedral, Cuyahoga Falls, Ohio, U.S.
- Website: ernestangley.org

Ernest Winston Angley (August 9, 1921 – May 7, 2021) was an American Christian evangelist, author, and television station owner who was based in Cuyahoga Falls, Ohio from the 1950s until his death in 2021.

Ernest Angley was born in Mooresville, Iredell County, North Carolina. In his autobiography, he details his early life being raised in the Charlotte, North Carolina, area as a Baptist, and at the age of 18 accepting Jesus Christ as his Savior. In the early 1950s, he moved to Northeast Ohio as a traveling "salvation and healing" Pentecostal evangelist.

== Facilities ==
=== Grace Cathedral ===
Angley's non-denominational ministry was originally based at Grace Cathedral (a.k.a. the "Temple of Healing Stripes") in Springfield Township, Ohio, southeast of Akron. That church is now known as Grace Cathedral – Akron and is used by their youth ministry and for church weddings, funerals, and Bible study.

In 1984, Angley purchased part of a large complex in his home base of Cuyahoga Falls, Ohio, that was formerly owned by televangelist Rex Humbard, which includes the church formerly known as the Cathedral of Tomorrow (which was rededicated as Grace Cathedral) and its next-door television studios.

=== Winston Broadcasting Network ===
In 1985, Angley contracted to provide financial support and studio facilities for the launch of Akron-licensed station WBNX-TV (channel 55) after their ownership group ran out of operating funds. Angley purchased WBNX-TV outright in 1987 under the licensee "Winston Broadcasting Network", derived from his middle name. WBNX initially aired a mixture of classic reruns, movies and Angley's television programs much in the mold of CBN, operating from the Grace Cathedral complex. WBNX added Fox Kids in 1994, then became the market's The WB affiliate in 1997, which transitioned to The CW in 2006.

=== Online Bible college ===
Angley began an online Bible college through his website in 2011 with the purpose of providing Bible study courses for laymen, missionaries, teachers and pastors. It is not an accredited college or school of divinity.

=== Boeing 747SP ===
Ernest Angley's ministry once operated a Boeing 747SP, named Star Triple Seven and bearing registration P4-FSH, which was used to transport missionaries and humanitarian aid internationally. The P4- tail number indicated that the aircraft was registered in Aruba. Subsequent reports indicated that the airplane was too large to fit any hangar at its home field and was only used once or twice per year. In September 2019, it was reported the plane was in disrepair and had not been flown for over nineteen months, with church funds being unable to provide $140,000 for needed repairs. The plane was stored at a small airport in Smyrna, Tennessee, as of 2018.

== Broadcasts ==
Angley launched The Ernest Angley Hour, a weekly program, in 1973, claiming to have created it after divine intervention. The Ernest Angley Hour aired on over 100 stations in the United States and Canada at its peak. Angley also hosted The Ninety and Nine Club (named in reference to Matthew 18:12–13) weekdays over WBNX-TV from the station's launch until his 2019 retirement.

== Controversies ==
=== Claim that Jesus heals HIV/AIDS ===
Angley's Christian faith-based teachings, in particular his claims (based on the Biblical scripture Mark 9:23 "Jesus said unto him, If thou canst believe, all things are possible to him that believeth.") that AIDS and other diseases can be cured by God's healing power, were met with skepticism in South Africa. In March 2007, the Advertising Standards Authority of South Africa, after receiving a complaint, cancelled a newspaper ad for Angley's ministry, based on lack of preliminary filing of medical documentation at that time for healing of AIDS through prayer.

Angley later claimed to have verifiable medical documentation from former AIDS patients that he offered to submit to any country that required it. In the same 2007 television broadcast, he displayed what he claimed was medical documentation from four alleged former HIV-positive patients of their negative tests results. Angley's claims were criticized by Guyanese officials. Health Minister Dr. Leslie Ramsammy released a statement condemning Angley: "We are unaware of the existence, to date, of any cure anywhere in the world for the HIV infection, and there has been no scientific documentation of any cure for AIDS. Anyone who promotes the misrepresentation that there is a religious-based cure for HIV is involved in an obscene exploitation of people’s vulnerability."

=== Murder at church-owned restaurant ===
In 1999, Shane Partin, a 27-year-old former staff member at Cathedral Buffet, stabbed and killed a volunteer, 15-year-old Cassandra Blondheim. Blondheim had previously complained to Buffet management about Partin's romantic advances, resulting in Partin's dismissal. However, Partin was later allowed to return as a volunteer. Partin was sentenced to 15 years to life in prison. Partin was denied parole in his first attempt in 2013, and again in 2023. Angley's ministry paid $100,000 in a settlement to Blondheim's family.

=== Volunteer staffing of church-owned restaurant ===
In March 2017, a federal district court ordered Angley to pay $388,000 in damages and back wages to a group of unpaid employees at the Cathedral Buffet whom Angley considered unpaid volunteers. The eating establishment is owned by the church. A few witnesses for the prosecution, who were former members of his church, said they felt pressured to volunteer as waiters, bussers and cash-register operators. This was the second time Angley had been cited for the same offense, the first in 1999, when he was ordered to pay $37,000 in back wages. The presiding judge added damages to the 2017 claim due to it being his second offense. Angley defended the Cathedral Buffet, stating he believed nothing wrong had been done, since the buffet served a religious purpose and the government's claims were a violation of the First Amendment to the United States Constitution. Angley appealed, and said he had spoken with about 75 people who worked at the buffet who said they did not feel pressured to work there.

On April 18, 2017, Angley's ministry closed the Cathedral Buffet to the public. The United States Court of Appeals for the Sixth Circuit reversed the district court and ruled in Angley's favor, concluding that the cafeteria workers had no expectation of being paid. The Buffet never reopened.

=== Sexual abuse allegations ===
Angley, who has spoken out against homosexuality as a sin, was accused of sexual abuse by male former Grace Cathedral pastor Rev. Brock Miller. The abuse included genital touching and naked massage. Miller filed a lawsuit against Angley, claiming in a two-part Beacon Journal interview that he was abused for nine years, then forced to move out of his home (which the Cathedral owned) after leaving the cathedral. After Angley countersued on defamation grounds, a settlement was reached between the two in February 2020, the terms of which included a non-disparagement clause. A 1996 tape recording of Angley admitting to sexual relations with a Cathedral employee was leaked to the Beacon Journal in January 2019. Allegations of further sexual abuses, including forced vasectomies and abortions, have also been reported.

== Popular culture ==
- Comedian Robin Williams included a satire of Angley in his stage routine as "Reverend Earnest Angry".
- One of the inspirations for the music video for the Genesis song, "Jesus He Knows Me", a barbed parody of televangelism, came from when Phil Collins and the rest of the band watched televangelists, including Ernest Angley (whom he bases one of the televangelists in the music video on) on a TV in a hotel while on tour in the United States. Angley misinterpreted the song as referencing him in a positive manner.

== Death ==
Angley died on May 7, 2021, at age 99. He involuntarily retired from preaching in February 2019 after finding himself unable to finish a pre-prepared sermon. Angley did not have a succession plan for the ministry, claiming "that's in the hands of the Lord... I'm planning on the Rapture". WBNX-TV was sold by the ministry to Nexstar Media Group on October 28, 2024.

== Bibliography ==
The author of many books as well as gospel songs, Angley's website states that he has donated all royalties from his books to the outreach ministry.

- Hurry Friday!. (Autobiography) (June 2004) Library of Congress catalog 2005615251
- Raptured. (A novel about the second coming of Christ based on a dispensational interpretation of biblical prophecy.) (First published 1950) Library of Congress catalog 2003611031 ISBN 0-8007-8172-4
- Faith in God Heals the Sick. (Biblical teaching on how to receive and keep physical healing from the Lord.)
- Untying God's Hands. (Many subjects including marriage, dating and ministry of angels are dealt with in this book.)
- Cell 15. (The true story of the imprisonment of Ernest Angley in Germany for preaching the Gospel.)
- God's Rainbow of Promises. (Scriptures from the Bible to cover a person's needs in times of trouble.)
- The Deceit of Lucifer. (Biblical answers to questions about hypnosis, visualization, astrology, demonology.) Library of Congress catalog 89827508
- Leeching of the Mind. (Dealing with depression and exposing the inner working of Lucifer in the human mind.)
- The Power of Bible Fasting (Comprehensive book with Old and New Testament scriptures about Bible fasting.)
- The Reality of the Person of the Holy Spirit Volumes 1–4. (Reveals the works of the Holy Spirit throughout the Old and New Testament scriptures and how the Holy Spirit affects the lives of people.)
- Prosperity: Spiritual, Physical, Financial (Biblical insights and teachings concerning God's plan of prosperity) Copyright 2001.
- Weeds in Eden (Describes the cost to God and man of minds overrun with the weeds of disobedience and rebellion.)
- The Unforgivable Sin. (A look into how a human can blaspheme against the Holy Ghost and how to avoid those paths.) Library of Congress catalog 2001615038
- Reality of the Blood Volumes 1–4. (Biblical insight concerning the divine blood of Jesus and its power of deliverance.)
- Love is the Road. (Discovering how to walk the paths of life using God's love and promises.)
- Living Free From Sin. (Volumes 1 & 2; Can a saved person be lost? Two comprehensive books dealing with the belief of 'Unconditional' Eternal Security, and how one can live free from sin. [Copyright 2007 & 2008])
- The Mind of Christ. (How one can take on the Mind of Christ. [Copyright 2005]) ISBN 1-935974-13-0
- Battles of the Mind!...peace be still. (How one can be free from the battles of the mind. [Copyright 2008]) ISBN 1-935974-14-9
- Reality of the Blood Vol. 5: Don't Waste the Blood (How to use the divine blood of Jesus to defeat the devil every day. [Copyright 2010]) ISBN 1-935974-17-3
- Healing From Heaven, Vol. 1 (How to receive miracles and healings from God. [Copyright 2012]) ISBN 978-1-935974-18-5
- "Healing from Heaven, Vol. 2" (Further details the vision of Ezekiel on the wheels. [Copyright 2012])
- The War is on... Armageddon (A novel based on Biblical truth; the sequel to "Raptured". [Copyright 2012]) ISBN 978-1-935974-19-2

== Personal life ==
Angley married the former Esther Lee "Angel" Sikes on November 25, 1943; they continued in ministry together and remained married until her death in 1970. They had no children.
