= Ernest Angley's Online Bible College =

Online Christian school

Coordinates: 40°56′52″N 81°34′00″W

Ernest Angley's Online Bible College, formerly Grace Bible College, is an online Christian school operated by Ernest Angley Ministries.

Grace Bible College was established circa 2005 (21 years ago) in Springfield Township, Ohio, near Akron, in the converted facilities of the original Grace Cathedral church founded by Ernest Angley and his wife, Angel. The college was established to train international missionaries and ministers. As of 2010, the grounds included an administration building, dormitories, chapel, classrooms and student center, and in 2011 the church facility was named Grace Cathedral - Akron as another branch to the larger Grace Cathedral - Cuyahoga Falls.

Ernest Angley's Online Bible College began online offerings in January 2011.

The location of Angley's main Grace Cathedral church is in Cuyahoga Falls, Ohio, at the former site of Rex Humbard's Cathedral of Tomorrow. The recently refurbished chapel building at 1055 Canton Road in Springfield Township, Ohio is used for church youth services on Saturday nights and is open to the public. It is also used by members of Grace Cathedral for special member ceremonies such as funeral services and weddings.
