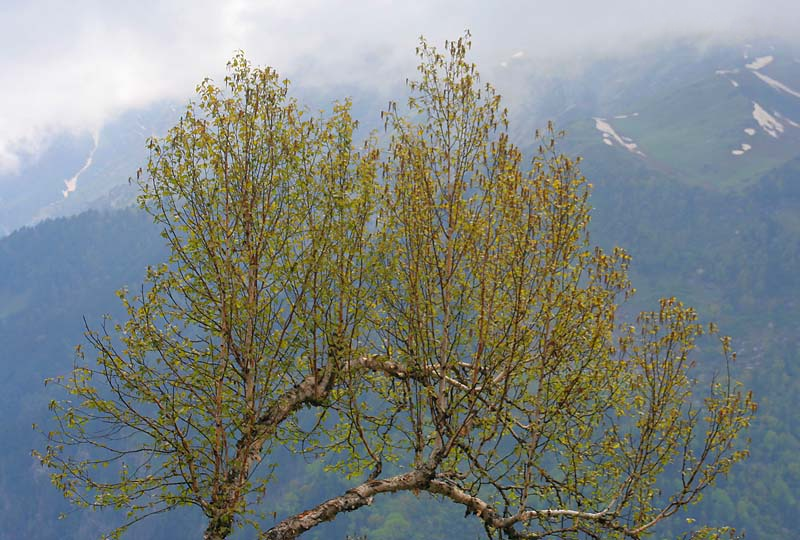
- Himalayan birch (bhojpatra) in Kullu, India

Conservation status
- Least Concern (IUCN 3.1)

Scientific classification
- Kingdom: Plantae
- Clade: Embryophytes
- Clade: Tracheophytes
- Clade: Angiosperms
- Clade: Eudicots
- Clade: Rosids
- Order: Fagales
- Family: Betulaceae
- Genus: Betula
- Subgenus: Betula subg. Neurobetula
- Species: B. utilis

Binomial name
- Betula utilis D.Don

Subspecies
- Betula utilis subsp. albosinensis (Burkill) Ashburner & McAll.; Betula utilis subsp. jacquemontii (Spach) Kitam.; Betula utilis subsp. occidentalis Kitam.; Betula utilis subsp. utilis

Synonyms
- Synonymy: Betula utilis var. typica Regel synonyms of subsp. albosinensis: Betula albosinensis Burkill; Betula albosinensis var. septentrionalis C.K.Schneid.; Betula bhojpattra var. sinensis Franch.; Betula utilis var. sinensis (Franch.) H.J.P.Winkl. synonyms of subsp. jacquemontii: Betula bhojpattra var. glandulifera Regel; Betula bhojpattra var. jacquemontii (Spach) Regel; Betula jacquemontii Spach; Betula utilis subsp. intermedia Kitam.; Betula utilis var. jacquemontii (Spach) H.J.P.Winkl. synonyms of subsp. occidentalis: Betula chitralica Browicz; Betula jacquemontii subsp. occidentalis (Kitam.) Browicz; Betula kunarensis Browicz; Betula pyrolifolia V.N.Vassil.; Betula utilis var. occidentalis (Kitam.) Ashburner & A.D.Schill.; Betula utilis var. parva Kitam. synonyms of subsp. utilis: Betula bhojpattra Wall.; Betula bhojpattra var. genuina Regel, not validly publ.; Betula bhojpattra var. latifolia Regel; Betula castanae Buch.-Ham. ex Hook.f., pro syn.; Betula jinpingensis P.C.Li; Betula utilis var. glandulifera Regel; Betula utilis var. latifolia Regel; Betula utilis var. prattii Burkill

= Betula utilis =

Species of birch

Betula utilis, the Himalayan birch or bhojpatra (from Sanskrit: भूर्ज bhūrjá), is a deciduous tree native to the Himalayas, Central Asia, and China, growing at elevations up to 4,500 m (14,800 ft). The Latin specific epithet utilis means "useful", and refers to the many uses of the different parts of the tree. The white, paper-like bark was used in ancient times as a writing surface for manuscripts of Sanskrit literature. It is still used as paper for the writing of mantras, with the bark placed in an amulet and worn for protection. Selected varieties are used for landscaping throughout the world, even while some areas of its native habitat are being lost due to overuse of the tree for firewood.

== Taxonomy ==
Betula utilis was described and named by botanist David Don in his Prodromus Florae Nepalensis (1825), from specimens collected by Nathaniel Wallich in Nepal in 1820. Betula jacquemontii (Spach), first described and named in 1841, was later found to be a variety of B. utilis, and is now Betula utilis var. jacquemontii.

== Description ==
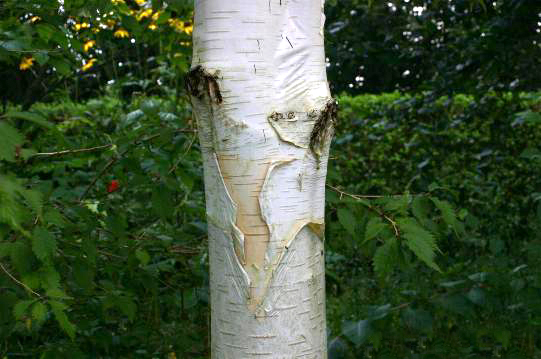
White, paper-like bark

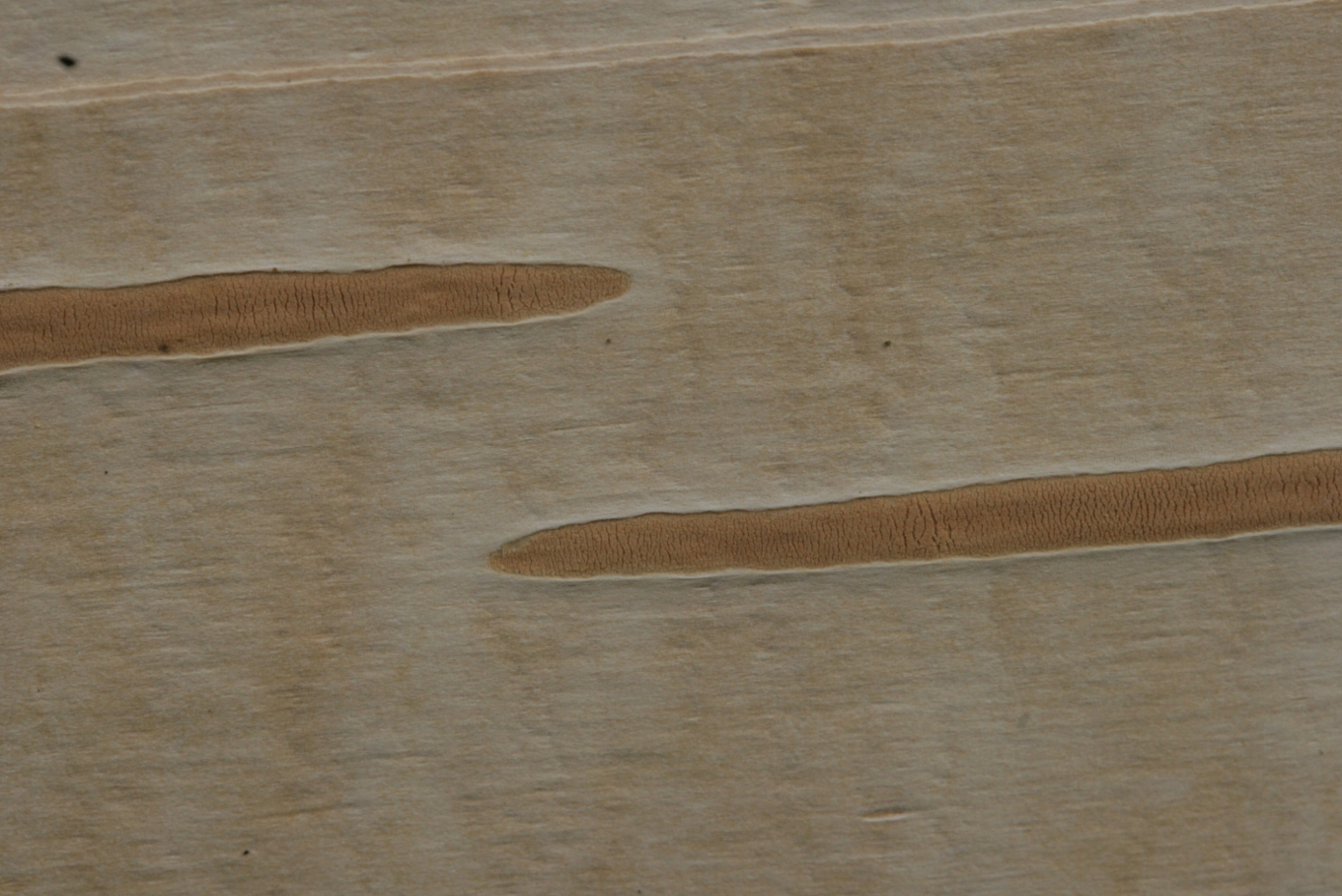
Close-up showing lenticels

In its native habitat, B. utilis tends to form forests, growing as a shrub or tree reaching up to 20 m (66 ft) tall. It frequently grows among scattered conifers, with an undergrowth of shrubs that typically includes evergreen Rhododendron. The tree depends on moisture from snowmelt, rather than from the monsoon rains. They often have very bent growth due to the pressure of the deep winter snow in the Himalaya.

Leaves are ovate, 5 to 10 cm (2.0 to 3.9 in) long, with serrated margins, and slightly hairy. Flowering occurs from May–July, with only a few male catkins, and short, single (sometimes paired) female catkins. The perianth has four parts in male flowers, and is absent in the female flowers. Fruits ripen in September–October.

The thin, papery bark is very shiny, reddish brown, reddish white, or white, with horizontal lenticels. The bark peels off in broad, horizontal belts, making it very usable for creating even large pages for texts. A fungal growth, locally called bhurja-granthi, forms black lumps on the tree weighing up to 1 kg.

The wood is very hard and heavy, and quite brittle. The heartwood is pink or light reddish brown.

== History and use ==
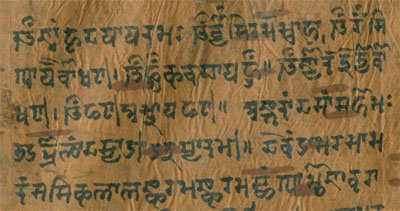
Kashmiri manuscript on birch bark (c. 17th century)

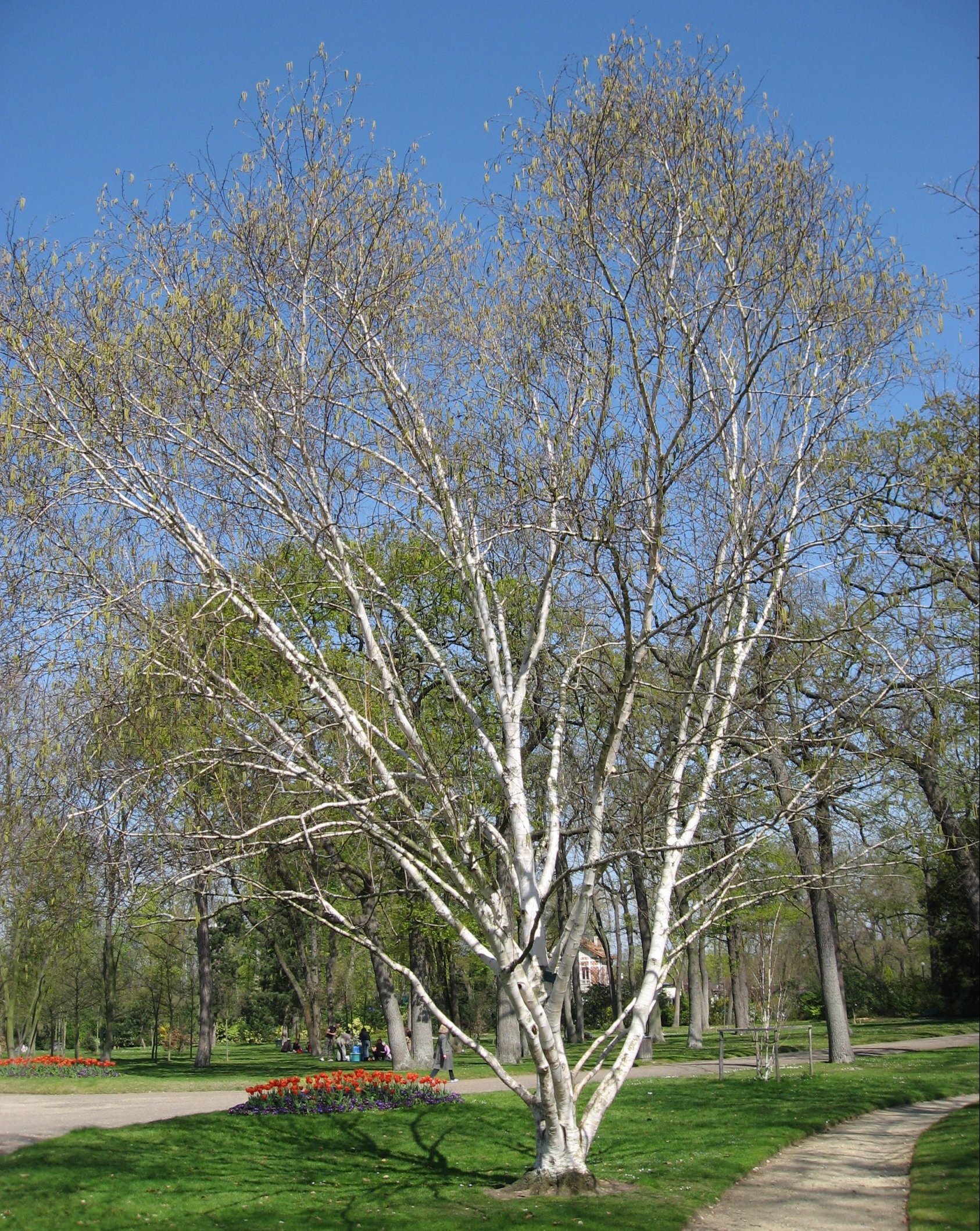
Betula utilis var. jacquemontii used in landscaping

The bark of Himalayan birch was used centuries ago in India as a writing surface for manuscripts of Sanskrit literature, particularly in Kashmir. Its use as paper for books is mentioned by early Sanskrit writers Kalidasa (c. 4th century CE), Sushruta (c. 3rd century CE), and Varahamihira (6th century CE). In the late 19th century, Kashmiri Pandits reported all of their books were written on Himalayan birch bark until Akbar introduced paper in the 16th century. The Sanskrit word for the tree भुर्ज bhūrja has cognates with other Indo-European words even English providing for the same "birch" tree.

The bark is still used for writing sacred mantras, which are placed in an amulet and worn around the neck for protection or blessing. This practice was mentioned as early as the 8th or 9th century CE, in the Lakshmi Tantra, a Pancaratra text. According to legend, the bark was also used as clothing by attendants of Shiva.

The bark is widely used for packaging material (particularly butter), roof construction, umbrella covers, bandages, and more. The wood is used for bridge construction, and the foliage for fodder. The most widespread use is for firewood, which has caused large areas of habitat to be eliminated or reduced. Parts of the plant, including the fungal growth (bhurja-granthi) have also long been used in local traditional medicine.

== Conservation ==
Deforestation due to overuse of the tree has caused loss of habitat for many native groves of B. utilis (locally called bhojpatra in the Indian Himalaya). The first high-elevation bhojpatra nursery was established in 1993 at Chirbasa, just above Gangotri, where many Hindus go on pilgrimage to the source of the sacred Ganges river. Harshvanti Bisht, a Himalayan mountaineer, established the first nursery and continues to expand the reforestation of bhojpatra in the Gangotri area and inside Gangotri National Park. About 12,500 bhojpatra saplings had been planted in the area by the year 2000. In recent years, attempts have been made to ban the collection of bhojpatra trees in the Gangotri area.

== Subspecies ==
Four subspecies are accepted:

- Betula utilis subsp. albosinensis (Burkill) Ashburner & McAll. – Chinese red birch – northern and central China. It is known from the provinces of Gansu, Hebei, Henan, Hubei, Inner Mongolia, Ningxia, Shaanxi, Shanxi, and Sichuan. It grows up to 35 metres tall in cool temperate montane mixed or mainly conifer forest, where it is found in openings in forests, screes and rocky places from 1,000 to 4,400 metres elevation. The IUCN Red List assesses the subspecies as Data Deficient.
- Betula utilis subsp. jacquemontii (Spach) Kitam. – Jacquemont birch – western Himalayas and Nepal. It is native to Himachal Pradesh, Jammu, Kashmir, and Uttaranchal in India, and western Nepal as far as the Kali Gandaki Gorge. It is a small tree which grows in mountain forests, stony river beds, scree slopes and rocky outcrops. At lower elevations they form open forests, and in exposed and rocky areas can develop a gnarled form with thick plates of bark. It often grows with thickets of Rhododendron campanulatum. The IUCN Red List assesses the species as Data Deficient.
- Betula utilis subsp. occidentalis Kitam. – Central Asia (Kazakhstan, Kyrgyzstan, Tajikistan, and Uzbekistan), Afghanistan, Pakistan, and the western Himalayas
- Betula utilis subsp. utilis – Nepal, eastern Himalayas, Tibet, northern Myanmar, and south-central China

== Varieties and cultivars ==
Many named varieties and cultivars are used in landscaping throughout the world. In the eastern end of the tree's native distribution, several forms have orange- or copper-colored bark. Betula utilis var. jacquemontii, from the western end of the native habitat, is widely used because several cultivars have especially white bark. The following have gained the Royal Horticultural Society's Award of Garden Merit:-

- 'Doorenbos'
- 'Fascination'
- 'Forest Blush'
- 'Grayswood Ghost'
- 'Jermyns'
- 'Park Wood'
- 'Silver Shadow'

The bark of 'Wakehurst Place Chocolate', as the name implies, is dark brown to nearly black.
