= Peter Gallo =

American artist

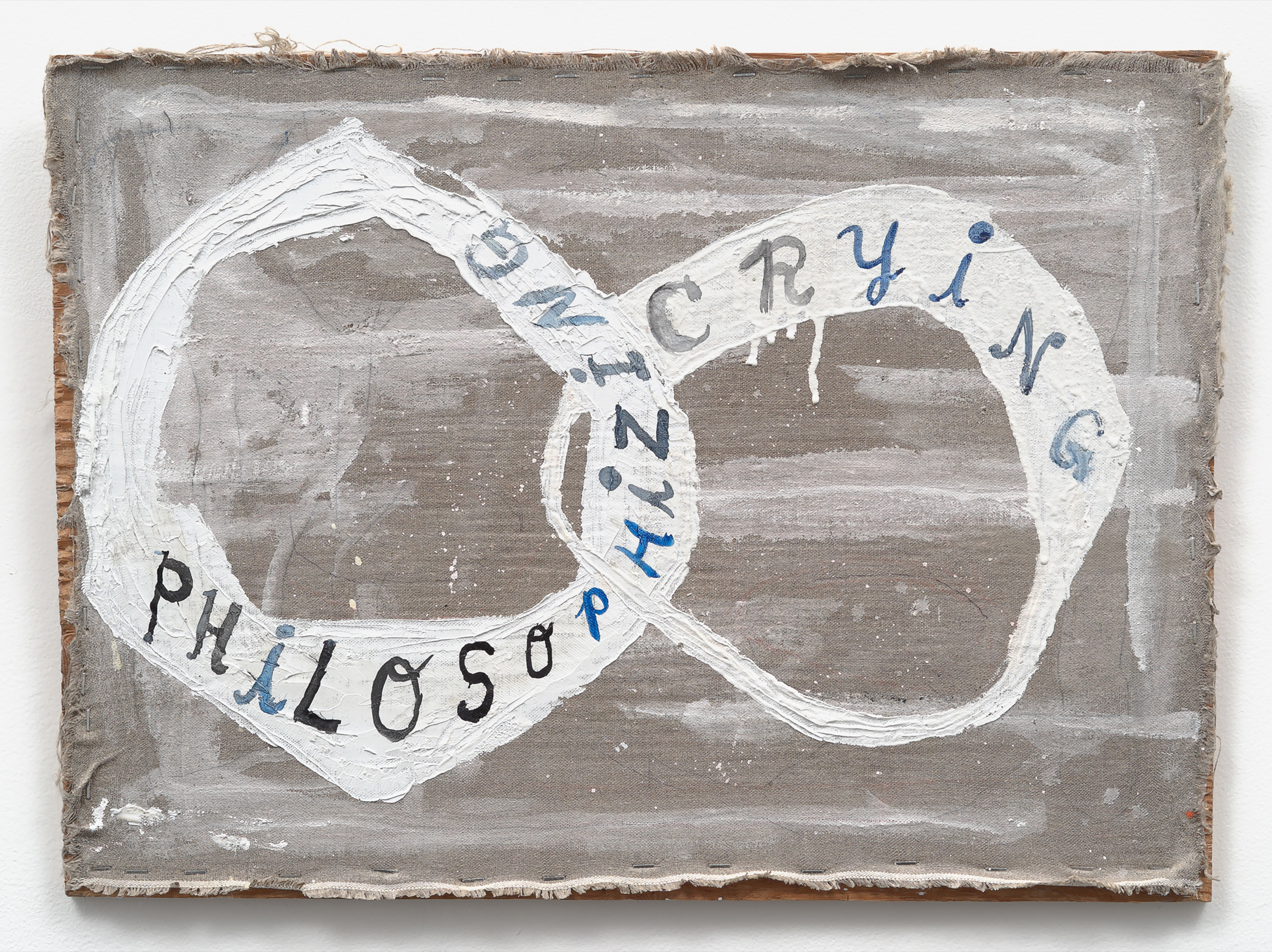

Peter Gallo (born 1959 in Rutland, Vermont) is an artist and writer who lives and works in Hyde Park, VT. He received his Ph.D. and MA in Art History from Concordia University, Montreal, and has written about the intersection of biopolitics, medicalization, and artistic experience from the eighteenth to early twenty-first centuries. He has a BA from Middlebury College, Middlebury, VT. For many years Gallo worked as a psychiatric crisis support worker and services coordinator for people with psychiatric and developmental disabilities in northern Vermont. Additionally, the artist has been active in the Grass Roots Art and Community Efforts (GRACE) in Hardwick, VT. He has organized numerous exhibitions including "Insider Art," (GRACE traveling exhibition, 1990), and Our Yard in the Future: The Art of Gayleen Aiken (Horton Gallery, 2007). He has contributed criticism to Art in America and Art New England, among others. The artist is represented by Anthony Reynolds Gallery in London, England. Gallo's works have been featured in solo and group exhibitions in the United States and Europe, and are included in notable collections of contemporary art.

Gallo draws from a wide variety of sources – art historical, political, and literary, and often incorporates poetic, philosophical and found texts in his mixed-media paintings. He utilizes simple formal structures which emphasize the materiality of painting, and his works alternate between or combine both abstract and figurative elements. Nautical imagery derived from historical sources such as the "ship of fools," and the "ship of state," are among his signature subjects. His paintings often incorporate unconventional materials, including buttons, toothpicks, newspaper clippings, found photographs, string, typed texts, dental floss and chicken bones. His “improvisatory” style has been compared to that of Ree Morton, Joy Division and Forrest Bess. Critic Jonathon Goodman writes that in current art trends this kind of “ad hoc creativity often serves to mask poor skills, but in Gallo’s case, the rawness is a genuine part of his aesthetic, whose ungainliness keeps us thinking.“

== Notable exhibitions ==
- CaixaForum, Barcelona, Spain
- Anthony Reynolds Gallery, Angels Barcelona, Barcelona, Spain
- The Douglas Hyde Gallery, Trinity College, Dublin, Ireland
- "The Patients and the Doctors", Zieher Smith and Horton Gallery, New York, NY
- Anthony Reynolds Gallery, London, England
- Fool's House, LeRoy Neiman Gallery, Columbia University, New York, NY
- Update, White Columns, New York, NY
- Sequence and Consequence, Steven Kasher Gallery, New York, NY
- White Columns (White Room), New York, NY
- Troubling Customs, Ontario College of Art and Design, Toronto, Ontario and The School of the Museum of Fine Arts, Boston, MA
