= The Grace =

The Grace or The Graces may refer to:

- Charites of Greek mythology
- The Grace (group), a South Korean girl group
- The Graces (band), a late 1980s and early 1990s American band
- "The Grace" (song), a 2005 song by Neverending White Lights
- The Graces (Ireland), a series of proposed reforms in 17th century Ireland
- The Grace, music venue at The Garage (London)

== See also ==
- Grace (disambiguation)
