= Grace Bible College =

Grace Bible College may refer to:

- Grace Christian University, known from 1961 to 2018 as "Grace Bible College"
- Ernest Angley's Online Bible College, formerly known as "Grace Bible College"
- Grace Bible College (Kenya), associated with the Africa Evangelical Presbyterian Church
