= Grace (comics) =

Grace, in comics, may refer to:

- Grace Choi, a DC Comics superhero
- Grace, a Dark Horse Comics superhero and a member of Catalyst
- Grace, a Marvel Comics character and part of the support staff of the New Warriors
- Grace Holloway, a Dr. Who companion who has appeared in Doctor Who Monthly
- Grace Guinness, a character from Checkmate
- Gamora's Graces, a group of characters who appeared in the Annihilation storyline

It may also refer to:

- Amazing Grace, a DC Comics supervillain part of Darkseid's Elite
- Karin Grace, a DC Comics character part of the Suicide Squad
- Francesca Grace, a Marvel UK character who appeared in titles like Knights of Pendragon

== See also ==
- Grace (disambiguation)
