= Gracility =

Slenderness of build

Gracility is slenderness, the condition of being gracile, which means slender. It derives from the Latin adjective gracilis (masculine or feminine), or gracile (neuter), which in either form means slender, and when transferred for example to discourse takes the sense of "without ornament", "simple" or various similar connotations.

In Glossary of Botanic Terms, B. D. Jackson speaks dismissively of an entry in earlier dictionary of A. A. Crozier as follows: "Gracilis (Lat.), slender. Crozier has the needless word 'gracile'". However, his objection would be hard to sustain in current usage; apart from the fact that gracile is a natural and convenient term, it is hardly a neologism. The Shorter Oxford English Dictionary gives the source date for that usage as 1623 and indicates the word is misused (through association with grace) for "gracefully slender". This misuse is unfortunate at least, because the terms gracile and grace are unrelated: the etymological root of grace is the Latin word gratia from gratus, meaning 'pleasing', and has nothing to do with slenderness or thinness.

== In biology ==
In biology, the term is in common use, whether as English or Latin:

- The term gracile and its opposite, robust—occur in discussion of the morphology of various hominids for example.
- The gracile fasciculus is a particular bundle of axon fibres in the spinal cord
- The gracile nucleus is a particular structure of neurons in the medulla oblongata
- "GRACILE syndrome", is associated with a BCS1L mutation
- The gracilis muscle is a thin, flat muscle of the medial thigh

In biological taxonomy, gracile is the specific name or specific epithet for various species. Where the gender is appropriate, the form is gracilis. Examples include:

- Campylobacter gracilis, a species of bacterium implicated in foodborne disease
- Ctenochasma gracile, a late Jurassic pterosaur
- Eriophorum gracile, a species of sedge, Cyperaceae
- Euglena gracilis, a unicellular flagellate protist
- Hydrophis gracilis, a species of sea snakes
- Melampodium gracile, a flowering plant species
- Moeritherium gracile, an Eocene mammal species

The same root appears in the names of some genera and higher taxa:

- Gracilaria is a genus of red algae in the order Gracilariales
- Gracillaria is a genus of leaf miner moths in the superfamily Gracillarioidea

== See also ==
- Buckling, for the slenderness ratio in engineering
- Grace (disambiguation)
- Gracilis (disambiguation), a Latin adjective in several species names – as remarked above, the meanings are the same as for gracile, except for their grammatical gender
- Slenderness ratio
- Somatotype and constitutional psychology
