= Gayleen Aiken =

American painter (1934–2005)

- Born: March 25, 1934; Barre, Vermont, U.S.
- Died: March 29, 2005 (aged 71); Barre, Vermont, U.S.
- Known for: painting, drawing
- Movement: Outsider art, Visionary art

Gayleen Aiken (March 25, 1934 – March 29, 2005) was an American artist who lived in Barre, Vermont. She achieved critical acclaim during her lifetime for her naive paintings and her work has been included in exhibitions of visionary and folk art since the 1980s. She is considered an outsider artist.

== Life ==
Aiken was born in Barre, Vermont, on March 25, 1934. She was self-taught as an artist. In the early 1980s she was discovered by Grass Roots Art and Community Effort (GRACE), a Vermont grass-roots arts organization. GRACE's exhibition program exhibited her work for the first time.

== Work ==
Gayleen Aiken produced paintings and drawings that often combined narrative text and image, cardboard cutouts, and book works. She used crayon, pen, pencil, and oil paint. Her themes included music and musical instruments, the large old farmhouse where she grew up, the lyricism of Vermont's seasons, the granite industry, and rural life. These themes were connected via a cast of recurring characters: members of an imaginary extended family which she called the Raimbilli Cousins.

== Awards ==
In 1987, Aiken was a recipient of a Vermont Council on the Arts fellowship. In 1997, Harry B. Abrams, Inc. released Moonlight and Music: The Enchanted World of Gayleen Aiken, produced with the novelist Rachel Klein. Her artwork has been featured in The New York Times, Raw Vision, The Boston Globe, Smithsonian, and Folk Art Magazine.

== Collections and exhibits ==
Aikens's works are included in the permanent collections of the Smithsonian American Art Museum, Washington, D.C.; Abby Aldrich Rockefeller Folk Art Museum, Williamsburg, VA; Museum of American Folk Art, New York, NY and Pennsylvania Academy of the Fine Arts Museum, Philadelphia, PA.

Aikens's art has also been featured in many exhibitions, including at Lincoln Center Gallery, the American Visionary Art Museum, and Works by Gayleen Aiken (2002) at the Vermont Granite Museum. She had a one-woman show of about 30 paintings in the Gallery at Lincoln Center in New York City in 1987.

Posthumous solo exhibits of her work include Our Yard in the Future: The Art of Gayleen Aiken, an exhibit curated by artist Peter Gallo, at the SUNDAY L.E.S. (now Horton Gallery) in New York City in 2007, and Cousins, Quarries and a Nickelodeon at the Luise Ross Gallery, New York in 2013.

She was featured in the 2013 Outsider Art Fair.

== In popular culture ==
Jay Craven's 1985 documentary, Gayleen, details Aiken's life and artworks.
