= Grace Hospital =

Grace Hospital may refer to:

== Fictional ==
- The fictional Seattle Grace Hospital in Seattle, Washington, which is the setting for the ABC series Grey's Anatomy

== Active ==
- Grace Hospital (Morganton), Morganton, North Carolina, United States
- Grace Hospital (Richmond, Virginia)
- Grace Hospital (Winnipeg)
- Sinai-Grace Hospital, Detroit, Michigan
- Toronto Grace Health Centre, Toronto, Ontario, Canada

== Defunct ==
- B.C. Women's Hospital & Health Centre (formerly Grace Hospital), Vancouver, British Columbia, Canada
- Birchmount Hospital (formerly Scarborough Grace Hospital), Toronto, Ontario, Canada
- Grace Hospital (Boston)
- Grace Hospital (Seattle)
- Grace Maternity Hospital in Halifax, Nova Scotia which merged with Izaak Walton Killam Hospital in 1995. Now known as IWK Health Centre
- Grace Hospital in New Haven, Connecticut, which merged with New Haven Hospital in 1945. Now known as Yale New Haven Hospital
- Grace Hospital in Ottawa, Ontario, now part of The Ottawa Hospital network.
