= Grass Roots Art and Community Effort =

Grass Roots Art & Community Effort (GRACE) is a non-profit organization based in Hardwick, Vermont, United States, that supports art-making among local community members, including the elderly and patients of mental health centers. Perhaps the most notable artist associated with GRACE is the late Gayleen Aiken. The organization maintains a permanent collection of art made in its programs. GRACE was founded in 1975 by Don Sunseri, a New York artist of the 1960s and 1970s who "escaped the insulation and sophistication of the art world," and whose credo was "Be yourself and do it your way."
