= Grace, West Virginia =

Unincorporated community in the United States

Grace
- Unincorporated community
- Location within the state of West Virginia Grace (the United States)
- Coordinates: 38°53′9″N 81°21′10″W
- Country: United States
- State: West Virginia
- County: Roane
- Elevation: 692 ft (211 m)
- Time zone: UTC-5 (Eastern (EST))
  - Summer (DST): UTC-4 (EDT)
- GNIS ID: 1549712

Grace is an unincorporated community in Roane County, West Virginia, United States.
