= Cathedral of Tomorrow =

Former church In Ohio, United States

Coordinates: 41.14686°N 81.50974°W

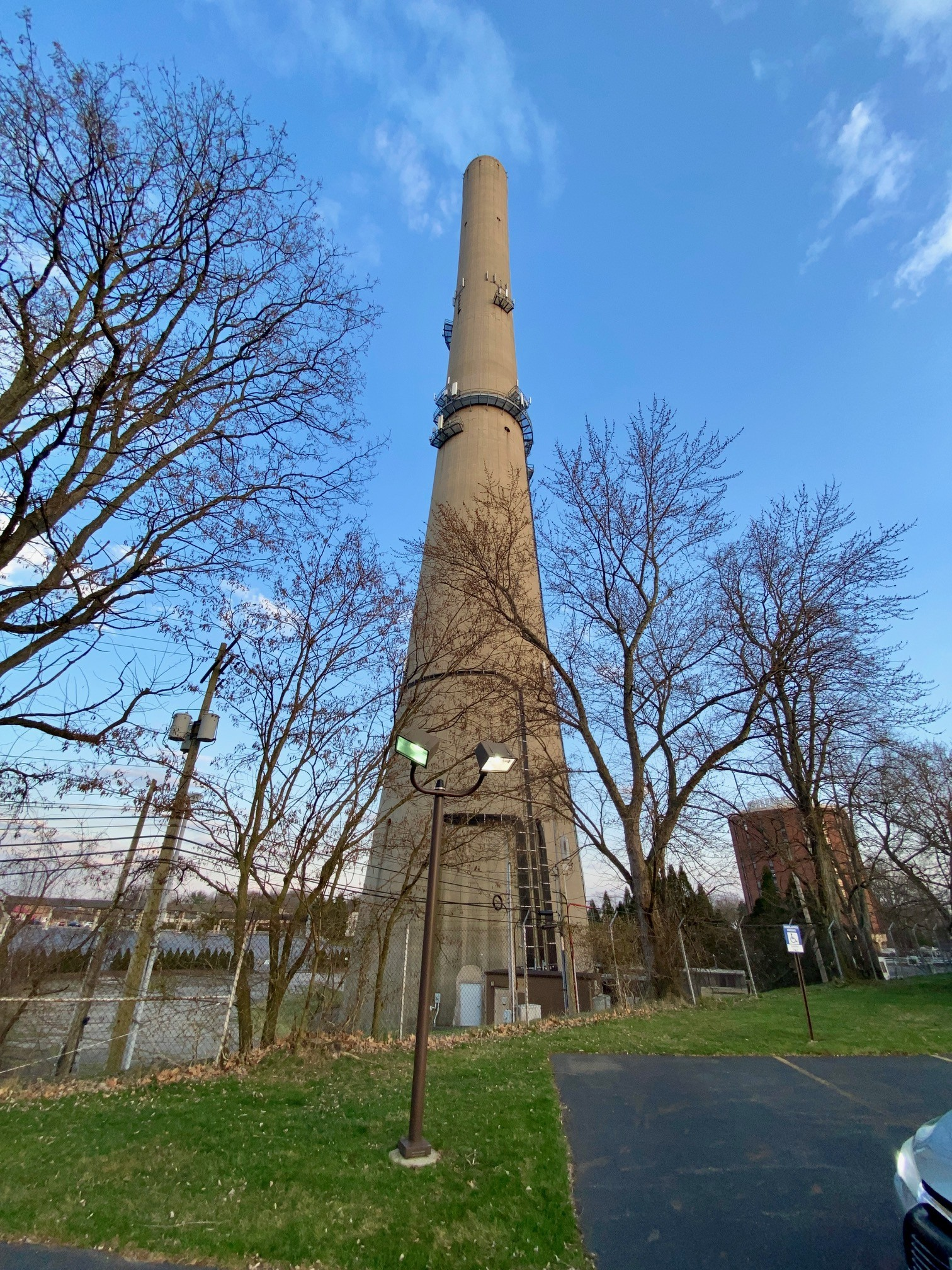
Cathedral Tower in 2024

The Cathedral of Tomorrow was a Pentecostal church in Cuyahoga Falls, Ohio.

== Cathedral Tower ==
In 1971, Rex Humbard began to build a 750 feet (230 m) rotating tower restaurant, similar to Calgary Tower, at his Cathedral of Tomorrow complex, which was also slated to hold a transmission tower for his planned local TV station, WCOT-TV (Channel 55; the license was later used by CW affiliate WBNX-TV).

Construction started on September 10, but stopped in November when the concrete tower was 494 feet (151 m) in height. Neighbors filed lawsuits and Northampton Township, the community governing the Cathedral complex at that time, said that there were no provisions for water and sewer service for the tower. The actual reason for the end of construction remains unknown.

In 1973, Humbard announced new, smalled plans for a museum, library and prayer center in the tower. In 1978, Humbard said, "Someday we'll finish it, and it'll be a landmark." In the 1980s, Humbard moved to Florida.

In 1989, the tower was sold at a sheriff's auction held to raise money to pay toward debts owed to the tower's builder. Local grocer Mike Krieger bid $30,000, and won with the only bid.

The tower later saw use as a cellular phone tower.

The Cathedral of Tomorrow remained in operation as a local church, with services conducted by local pastors who had increasingly fewer ties with the Humbard family. Attendances dwindled, although Humbard guest-spoke on occasion.

In 1994, the Cathedral was sold to minister Ernest Angley, who renamed it Grace Cathedral after his previous church. The office complex next door contains a museum containing The Life Of Christ, a diorama by artist Paul Cunningham; and a popular family-style restaurant, the Cathedral Buffet.

About a decade earlier, Angley had purchased the Cathedral of Tomorrow's television studio facilities, which are used to produce his own television programs and house the offices of WBNX-TV, the Cathedral Buffet restaurant, and other leased office space.

The Cathedral Buffet was sued for violating Fair Labor Standards Act by the United States Department of Labor in 1999 and in 2017. During the latter lawsuit, Angley argued that his employees were actually "volunteers", and that the restaurant's prices were so low that it could not afford to pay them. The court found him guilty in both instances and fined him $37,000 and $388,000 respectively in damages and wages. In April 2017, Angley closed the Cathedral Buffet. In April 2018, the 6th Circuit Court of Appeals reversed the lower court's decision, concluding there was no violation of the because the volunteers had no expectation of compensation.
