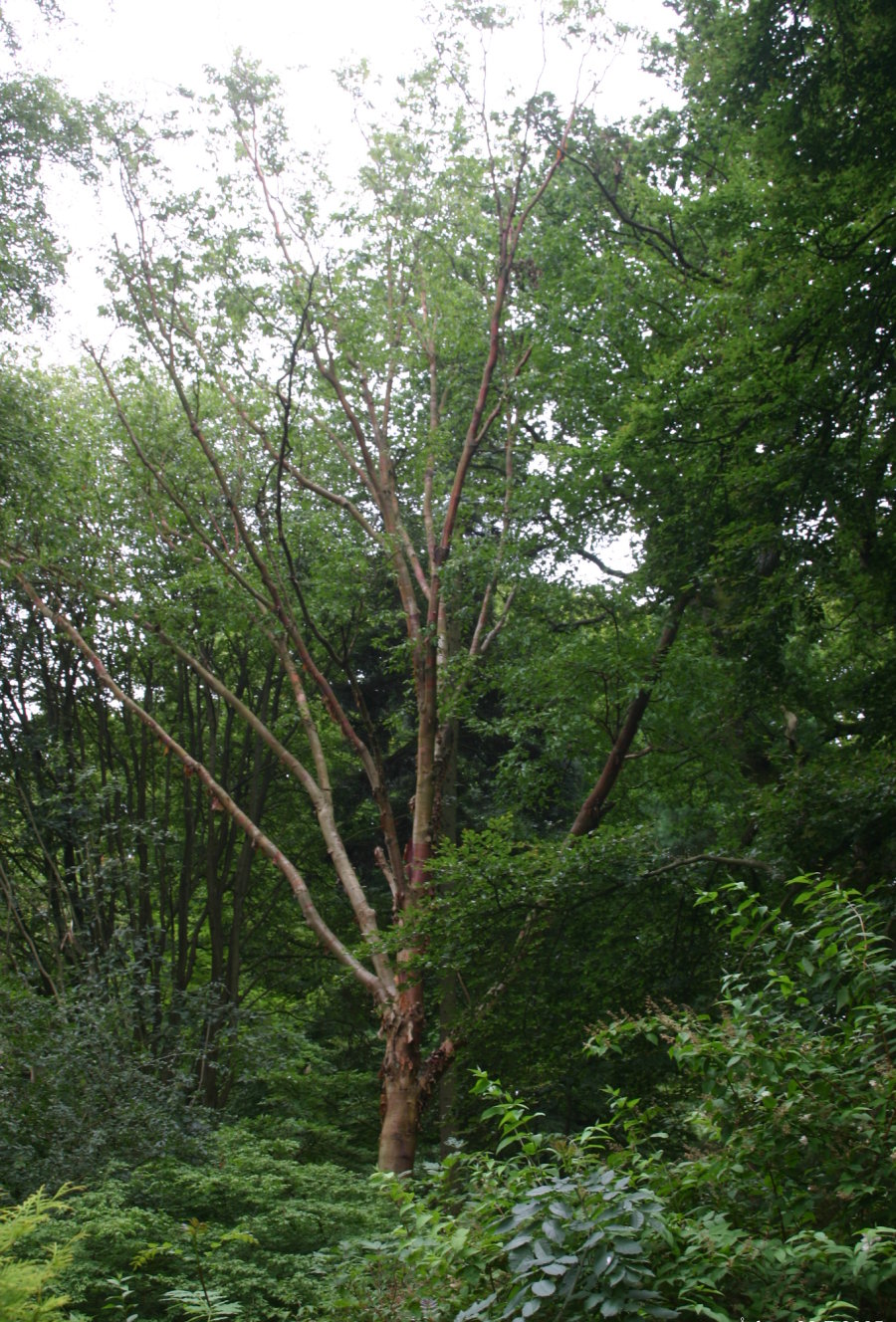
- Chinese red birch

Conservation status
- Data Deficient (IUCN 3.1)

Scientific classification
- Kingdom: Plantae
- Clade: Embryophytes
- Clade: Tracheophytes
- Clade: Angiosperms
- Clade: Eudicots
- Clade: Rosids
- Order: Fagales
- Family: Betulaceae
- Genus: Betula
- Subgenus: Betula subg. Neurobetula
- Species: B. utilis
- Subspecies: B. u. subsp. albosinensis

Trinomial name
- Betula utilis subsp. albosinensis (Burkill) Ashburner & McAll.

Synonyms
- Betula albosinensis Burkill; Betula albosinensis var. septentrionalis C.K.Schneid.; Betula bhojpattra var. sinensis Franch.; Betula utilis var. sinensis (Franch.) H.J.P.Winkl.

= Betula utilis subsp. albosinensis =

Species of birch tree with red peeling bark

Betula utilis subsp. albosinensis, commonly known as the Chinese red birch, is a subspecies of birch in the family Betulaceae. It is a tree native to northern and central China. It is notable for its distinctive peeling bark and is cultivated as an ornamental tree.

== Description ==
Betula utilis subsp. albosinensis is a deciduous tree that can grow up to 25 m (82 ft) in height, with some specimens reaching 18 to 27 m (60 to 90 ft). The trunk can reach a circumference of 1.8 to 3.4 m (6 to 11 ft).

=== Bark ===
A distinctive feature is the red birch's peeling bark, which is brown but cream when newly exposed. The bark has been described as bright orange to orange-red, peeling off in very thin sheets. Each new layer of bark is covered with a white glaucous bloom, giving it a unique appearance.

=== Leaves ===
The leaves are ovate, 5 to 7.6 cm (2 to 3 in) long and 2.5 to 3.8 cm (1 to 1.5 in) wide, with a slender point and rounded base. They have unevenly jagged teeth along the edges and 9 to 14 pairs of veins. Young leaves have hair between the veins, becoming smooth (glabrous) with age.

=== Catkins ===
Brown catkins are produced in Spring. Male catkins are 3.8 to 6.4 cm (1.5 to 2.5 in) long, while female catkins are 2.5 to 3.8 cm (1 to 1.5 in) long and about 8 mm (1/3 in) wide. Female catkins are usually solitary, sometimes in pairs.

=== Other features ===
Young shoots are slightly glandular, becoming dark brown and smooth with scattered warts as they age.

== Taxonomy ==
Betula albosinensis was first described by Isaac Henry Burkill in 1899 in the Journal of the Linnean Society. The Latin specific name albosinensis means "white, from China".

Synonyms include B. bhojpattra var. sinensis and B. utilis var. sinensis.

In 2013 Ashburner & McAllister reclassified the taxon as Betula utilis subsp. albosinensis in "The genus Betula: a taxonomic revision of birches". This classification is accepted by Plants of the World Online (POWO), World Flora Online (WFO), and the IUCN Red List.

== Distribution and habitat ==
B. utilis subsp. albosinensis is native to northern and central China. It is known from the provinces of Gansu, Hebei, Henan, Hubei, Inner Mongolia, Ningxia, Shaanxi, Shanxi, and Sichuan. It grows up to 35 metres tall in cool temperate montane mixed or mainly conifer forest, where it is found in openings in forests, screes and rocky places from 1,000 to 4,400 metres elevation.

== Uses ==
=== Cultivation ===
B. utilis subsp. albosinensis is grown as an ornamental tree for parks and large gardens, valued for its striking bark. It was first introduced to cultivation in the West by E.H. Wilson in 1901, who collected specimens in Western Hupeh (now Hubei) province.

Numerous cultivars have been produced. The cultivars 'Fascination' and 'Red Panda' have gained the Royal Horticultural Society's Award of Garden Merit.

== Gallery ==
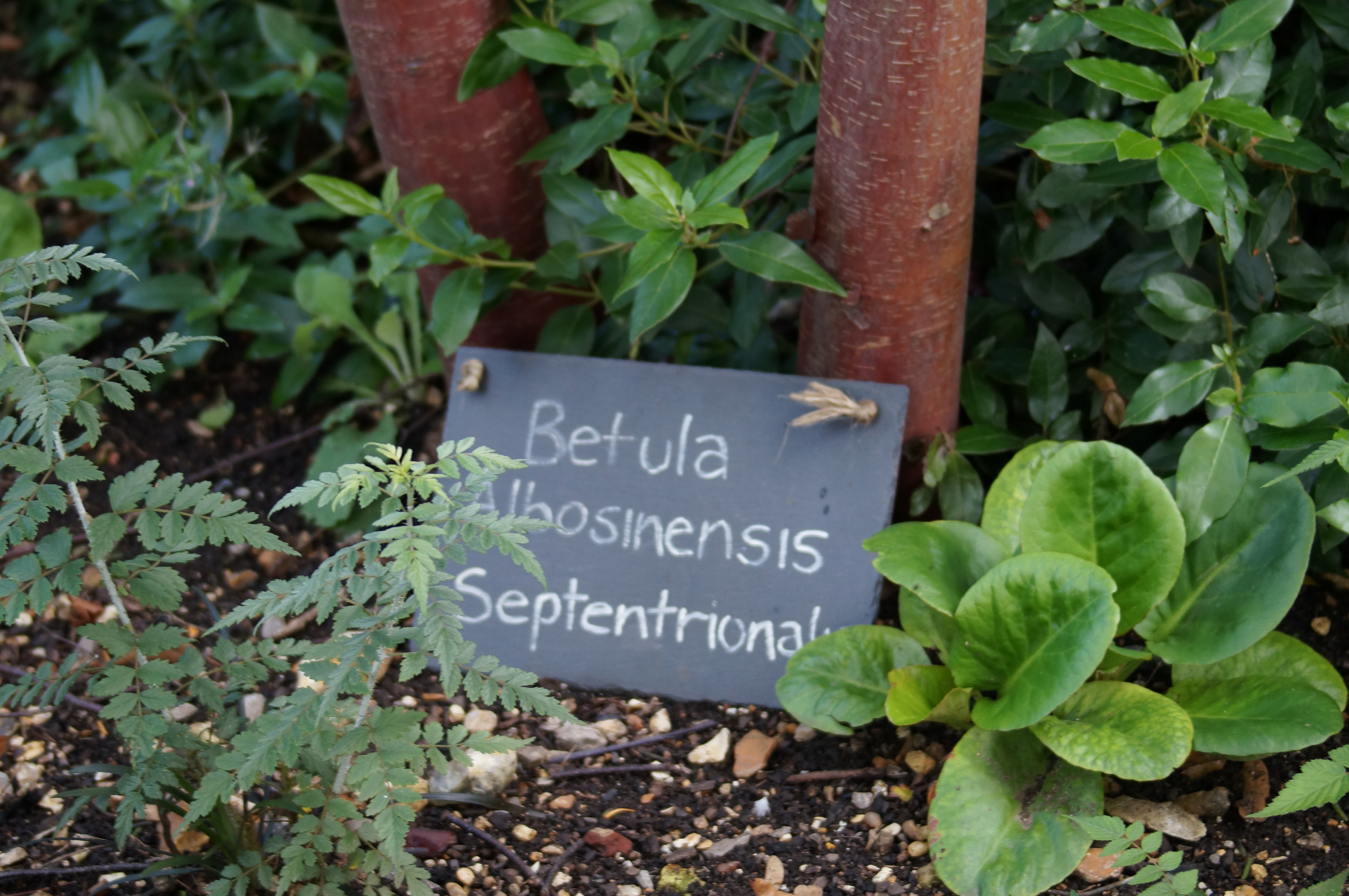

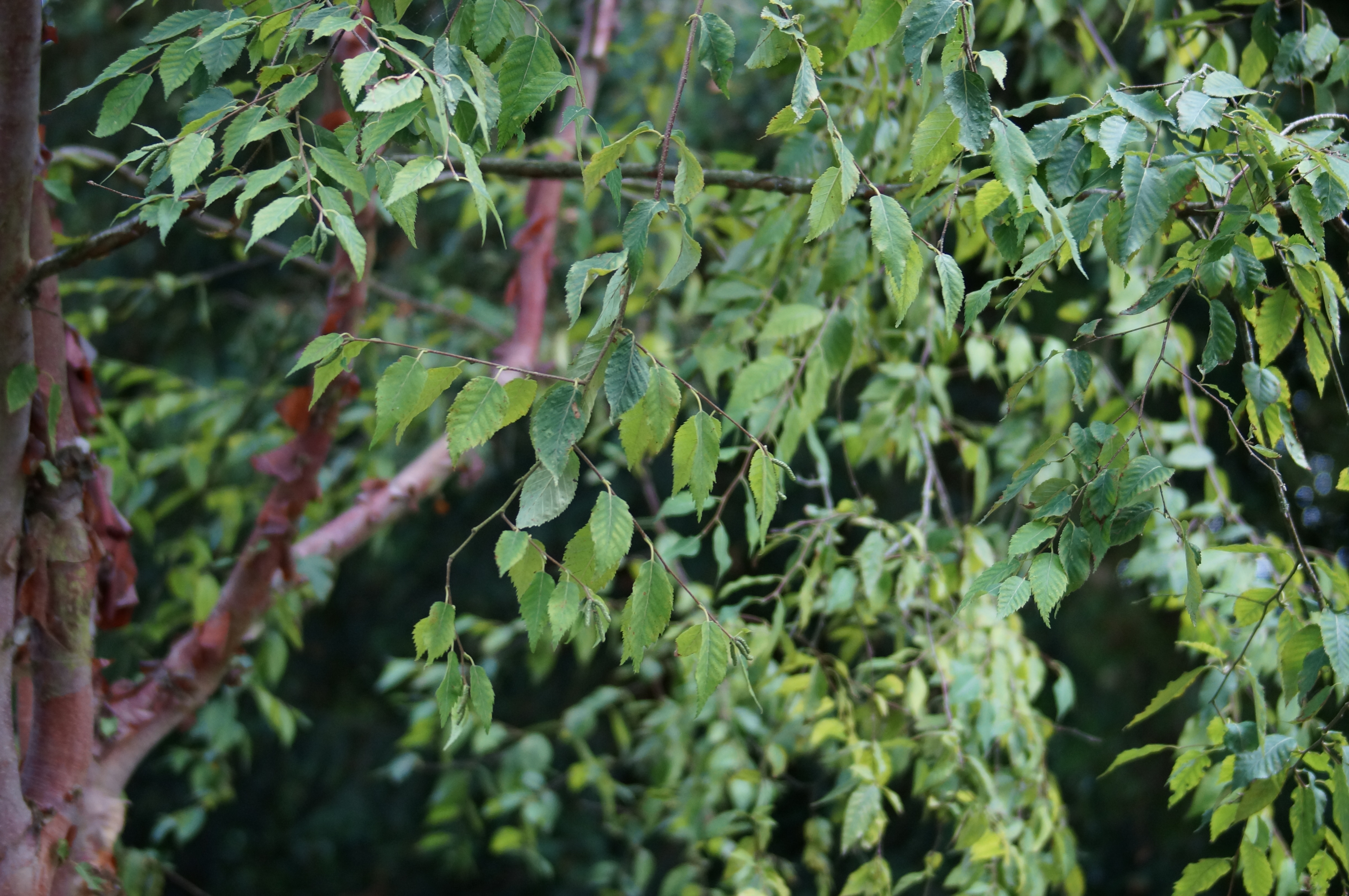

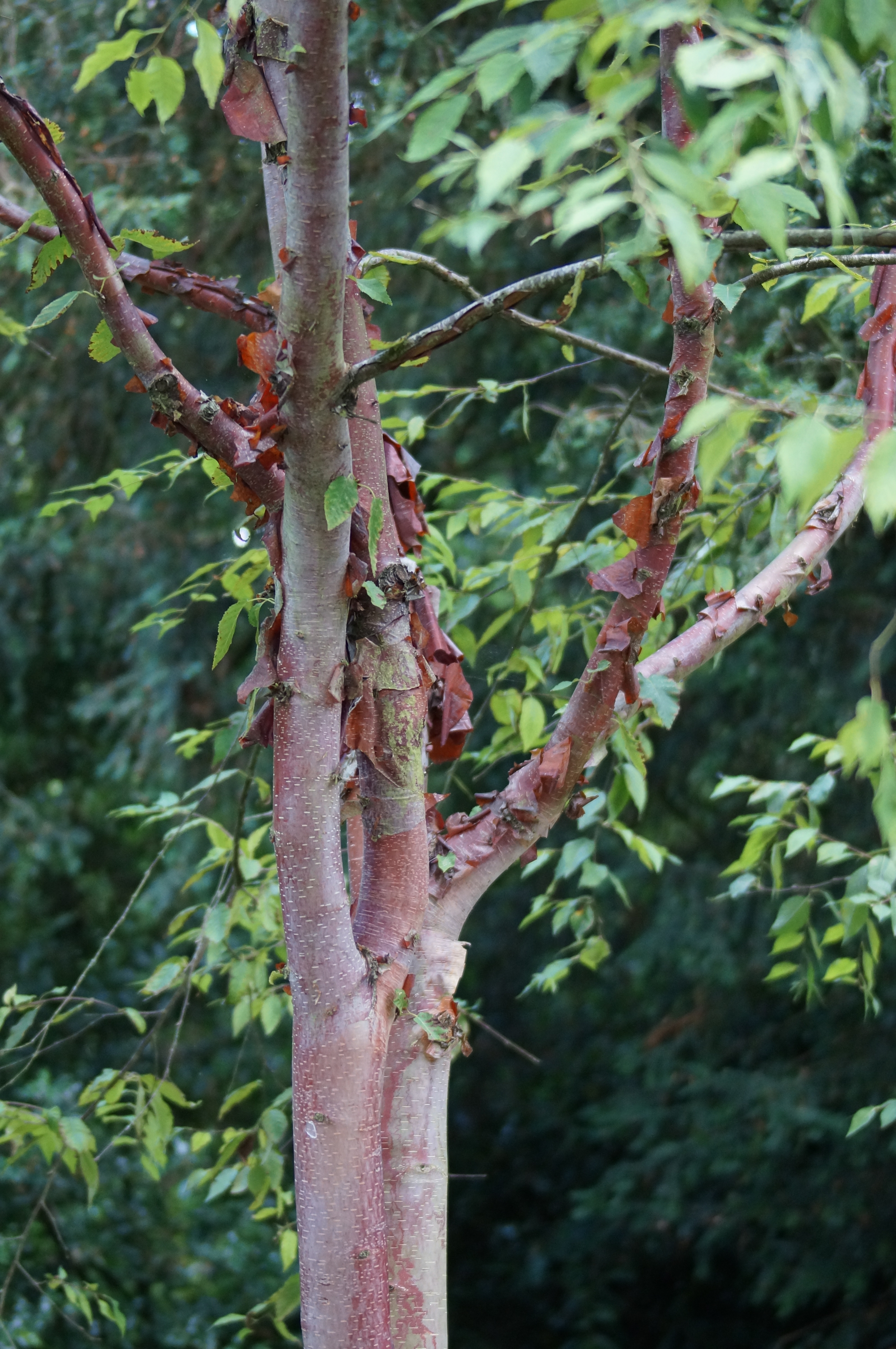
