= Grace, Montana =

Unincorporated community in Montana, U.S.

Coordinates: 45°48′24″N 112°19′49″W

Grace is an unincorporated community in Silver Bow County, in the U.S. state of Montana.

== History ==
Grace contained a post office between 1882 and 1926. The community was named for Grace Penfield, the wife of a railroad official.
