= Rex Humbard =

American evangelist (1919–2007)

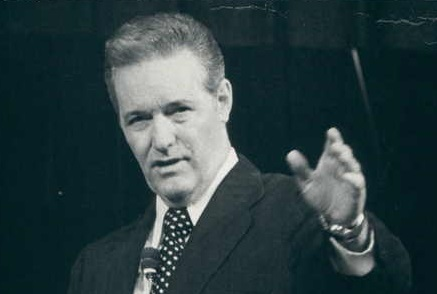
- Born: Alpha Rex Emmanuel Humbard; August 13, 1919; Little Rock, Arkansas, U.S.
- Died: September 21, 2007 (aged 88); Atlantis, Florida, U.S.
- Spouse: Maude Aimee
- Children: Rex, Jr., Don, Charles, and Elizabeth
- Parent(s): Alpha E. Humbard and Martha Bell
- Church: Pentecostal
- Congregations served: Cathedral of Tomorrow, Cuyahoga Falls, Ohio

Alpha Rex Emmanuel Humbard (August 13, 1919 – September 21, 2007) was an American television evangelist whose Cathedral of Tomorrow show was aired on over 600 stations at the peak of its popularity.

== Life and career ==
Humbard was born on August 13, 1919, in Little Rock, Arkansas, to Pentecostal evangelists. He began attending church revivals all across the country and was raised in the church, while withstanding the order from his father in learning how to play guitar while in church. Humbard was also the first evangelist to have a weekly nationwide television program in the United States, running from 1952 to 1983, although his first television broadcast was in 1949.

Humbard's $4 million Cathedral of Tomorrow church in Cuyahoga Falls, Ohio, a suburb of Akron, was built in 1958 specifically to accommodate television equipment, crew and chorus. It can seat 5,400 people.

Humbard's television programs featured gospel music such as the popular Cathedral Quartet. His wife, Maude Aimee, and his children were also often featured on the programs.

His ministry eventually extended to Canada, Europe, the Middle East, Far East, Australia, Latin America and Africa, giving it a worldwide reach of 20 million viewers, greater than any of his contemporaries by the late 1970s. In Brazil, he attracted large crowds at the giant soccer stadium in São Paulo for weeks. Humbard officiated at Elvis Presley's funeral, as Presley had been an admirer of Humbard's ministry.

In the 1960s, Humbard's ministry started to purchase businesses through a for-profit arm to raise money. Over time they owned a girdle factory in Brooklyn, an office tower in Akron, a college on Mackinac Island, an advertising agency, an apartment building, and other assets.

Humbard's ministry ran into financial problems in the early 1970s. Starting in 1959, the ministry had sold bonds and promissory notes through its own team of salesmen. The securities were not registered and came under the scrutiny of the Securities and Exchange Commission (SEC). Officials in at least six states halted the sale of the securities. Humbard said that the SEC did not allow him to count expected bequests from wills as assets, that the ministry never missed an interest payment, and that the investors were not worried about losing their money. In the end, he was forced to sell off nearly all of the ministry's assets and cut off the overseas operations.

Humbard began to build a rotating-tower restaurant (similar to Calgary Tower) at his Cathedral of Tomorrow complex in Cuyahoga Falls, which was also slated to hold a transmission tower for his planned local TV station on Channel 55, WCOT. During that time, though, the SEC investigation mentioned above occurred and Humbard had to stop construction of the tower, with the FCC subsequently deleting WCOT's authorization in 1976. The tower was never completed. Several years later, it was purchased by a local businessman, and is now used as a cellular telephone tower.

Humbard's son Rex, Jr. succeeded his father in the ministry after the family moved to Florida in 1982. Humbard's television ministry promoted an independent Christian television station in Canton, Ohio, WDLI (Channel 17), which later was purchased by the Trinity Broadcasting Network as its Cleveland-area station. Another son, Charles, heads the UP television network.

The rest of Humbard's Cathedral of Tomorrow complex was sold in 1984 to television evangelist Ernest Angley, while a new channel 55 allocation was acquired by Angley's Winston Broadcasting Network division for the current Akron-licensed and Cuyahoga Falls-based former CW affiliate, WBNX-TV.

After retiring to Lantana, Florida, in the 1980s with his wife, Maude Aimee (whom he married in 1942), Humbard was still often seen on television broadcasts and at public appearances preaching Christianity.

== Legacy ==
Humbard wrote two autobiographies, Miracles in My Life and, in 2006, The Soul Winning Century, The Humbard Family Legacy. He was inducted into the Broadcasters Hall of Fame in 1993 by Ohio Governor George Voinovich, after having been inducted into the National Religious Broadcasters Hall of Fame in 1991. Humbard was termed one of the "Top 25 Principal Architects of the American Century" by U.S. News & World Report on December 27, 1999. In April 2007, he was inducted into the Arkansas Walk of Fame.

Humbard died on September 21, 2007, in Atlantis, Florida, of congestive heart failure, following hospitalization, at the age of 88. He was survived by his wife, Maude Aimee (who died in 2012), and four children. He is buried at Rose Hill Burial Park in Fairlawn, Ohio.

== Bibliography ==
- Miracles in My Life
- The Soul Winning Century, The Humbard Family Legacy (2006)
