= Grace Hospital (Seattle) =

American hospital

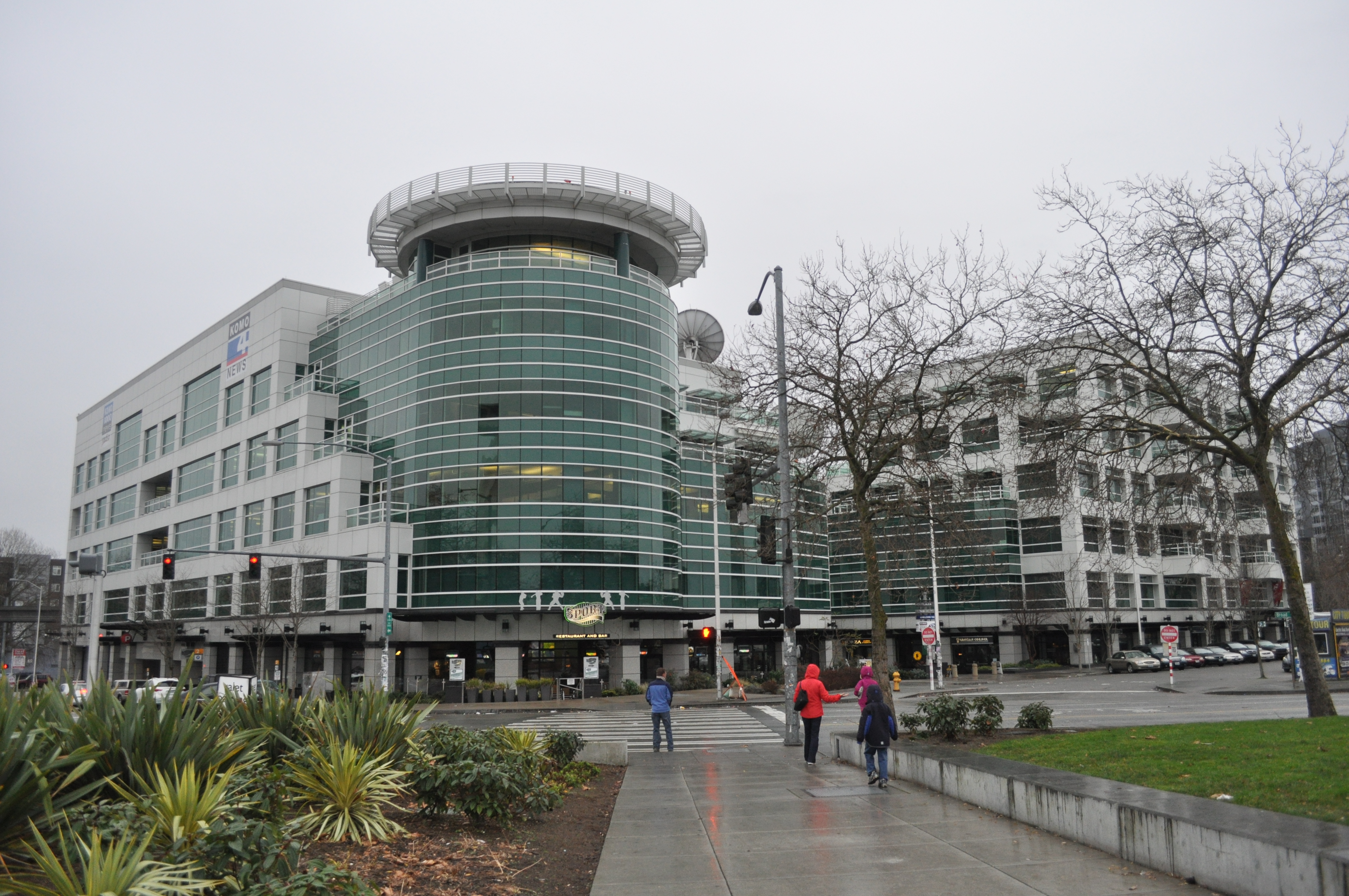
Fisher Plaza, headquarters of KOMO-TV at the corner of Fifth Avenue and Denny Way, stands in for the fictional "Grace Hospital" on the American television show Grey's Anatomy.

Grace Hospital may refer to three separate hospitals in Seattle:

- Grace Hospital was a forty-bed, two-story hospital opened in 1886 and located "by Trinity Church" (presumably Trinity Episcopal Parish Church in the First Hill neighborhood). It was long defunct and the building razed by 1905.
- Grace Hospital was a homeopathic hospital started by Dr. C.P Bryant in 1932. It was the only "open door" hospital on the West Coast.
- Seattle Grace Hospital is the name of the fictional hospital on the American television show Grey's Anatomy.
