= Divine intervention =

God-like deity aiding from above

Divine intervention is an event that occurs when a deity (i.e. God, gods, goddesses etc.) becomes actively involved in changing some situation in human affairs. In contrast to other kinds of divine action, the expression "divine intervention" implies that there is some kind of identifiable situation or state of affairs that a god chooses to get involved with, to intervene in, in order to change, end, or preserve the situation.

== Accounts of divine intervention ==
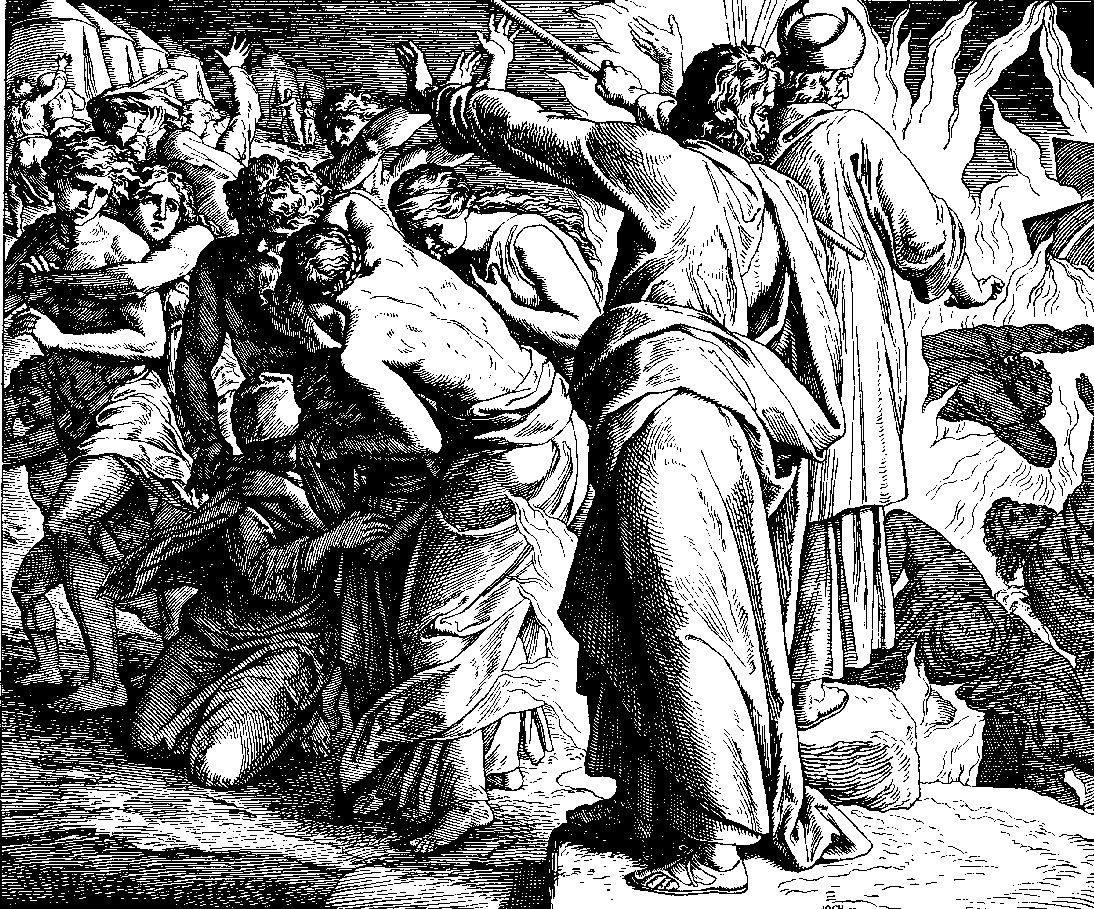
Korah's Rebellion, an 1860 woodcut by Julius Schnorr von Karolsfeld. God causes the ground to split open and swallow Korah and his followers for their rebellion against Moses.

Stories of divine intervention typically include a background story that lays out what "the situation" is and why the god in the story chooses to intervene. Often the god steps in to help or protect someone or something favored by the god.

A prototypical story of divine intervention can be found in Hindu mythology, in the story of Narasimha. In the story, the demon king Hiranyakashipu has extracted a guarantee from Brahma that he can be killed neither by man nor animal, neither indoors nor outdoors, neither during the day nor during the night. Feeling invulnerable, Hiraṇyakaśipu begins to persecute devotees of Vishnu, whom he hates. Prahlāda, a devoted Vaishnavite and the son of Hiraṇyakaśipu, prays to Vishnu for help. Vishnu hears his prayer and manifests himself as Narasimha (half-man, half-lion) and rips Hiraṇyakaśipu apart in a doorway (neither indoors nor outdoors) at dusk (neither during the day nor during the night).

In ancient Greece, divine intervention was frequently sought from the gods of the pantheon of Greek mythology, which contained accounts of such intervention. In The Iliad, substantial attention is given to the involvement of Zeus, Poseidon, and Athena in involving themselves on the side of either the Greeks or the Trojans in the Trojan War— engaging in miraculous acts, changing the weather, or bolstering the strength of combatants to aid their preferred side.

One of the most famous stories of divine intervention occurs in the Old Testament when Yahweh parts the Red Sea to allow his chosen people (Moses and the Israelites) to escape the pursuing army of the Pharaoh. Then Moses stretched out his hand over the sea. The Lord drove the sea back by a strong east wind all night, and turned the sea into dry land; and the waters were divided. The Israelites went into the sea on dry ground, the waters forming a wall for them on their right and on their left.

In the Quran during the Battle of Badr, Allah sent Angels to fight alongside the army of Muslims to defeat the pagan army

== Types of divine intervention ==
Various cultures have imagined many different kinds of divine action, including miracles, theophany, divine revelation, divine providence, and divine retribution. The expression act of God is typically used to describe an event outside human control, for which no person can be held responsible.

== Philosophical issues with divine intervention ==
William P. Alston has written that "Talk of divine 'intervention' stems from a deist picture of God as 'outside' His creation, making quick forays or incursions from time to time and then retreating to His distant observation post." Alston, however, overlooks the fact that deists typically reject the notion of miracles and divine intervention. He also overlooks the fact that tales of divine intervention occur most frequently in religions that view the gods as very human-like interested observers of— and active participants in— human affairs.

Related problems include the problem of the existence of God, the nature of laws of nature, the problem of evil and the question of why God allows (or causes) natural disasters and tragedies to happen, and questions surrounding the notion of fate or destiny. The notion of special intervention by God becomes problematic, for instance, if one also believes that God controls everything that happens, and that nothing happens that God does not will to happen. As R. C. Sproul says: "In a universe governed by God, there are no chance events." In such a universe, everything that happens is, in a sense, a result of divine intervention.

== See also ==
- Act of God
- Divine providence
- Divine retribution
- Miracle
- Revelation
- Theophany
