= List of Betula species =

Subgenera of genus Betula (birch), are;

== Subgenus Betulenta - Wintergreen oil birches ==
Bark on twigs rich in methyl salicylate (oil of wintergreen). Female catkins erect.

- Diploid (2n = 28).
  - Betula lenta - Sweet birch or cherry birch
    - Betula lenta subsp. uber - Cherry Creek birch
- Hexaploid (6n = 84).
  - Betula allegheniensis - Yellow birch (B. lutea)
- Decaploid (10n = 140).
  - Betula austrosinensis - South China birch
  - Betula globispica -
  - Betula medwediewii - Caucasian birch
- Duodecaploid (12n = 168).
  - Betula megrelica -
- chromosome number not reported
  - Betula corylifolia - Hazel-leaf birch
  - Betula grossa - Japanese cherry birch
  - Betula insignis -

== Subgenus Betulaster - Large-leaf birches ==
Bark on twigs contains some methyl salicylate. Female catkins pendulous.

- Betula alnoides - Alder-leaf birch
  - Betula alnoides subsp. luminifera -
- Betula maximowicziana - Monarch birch

== Subgenus Neurobetula - Costate birches ==
Bark on twigs without methyl salicylate. Female catkins erect.

- Diploid (2n = 28).
  - Betula calcicola -
  - Betula chichibuensis -
  - Betula costata - Korean birch
  - Betula nigra - River birch or black birch
  - Betula potaninii - Potanin's birch
- Tetraploid (4n = 56).
  - Betula albosinensis - Chinese red birch
    - Betula albosinensis var. septentrionalis - North Chinese red birch
  - Betula ermanii - Erman's birch
  - Betula jacquemontii (B. utilis subsp. jacquemontii) - White-barked Himalayan birch
  - Betula utilis - Himalayan birch
- Hexaploid (6n = 84).
  - Betula dahurica - Dahurian birch
  - Betula delavayi - Delavay's birch
  - Betula raddeana - Radde's birch
- Octoploid (8n = 112).
  - Betula chinensis - Chinese birch
- chromosome number not reported
  - Betula fargesii - Farges's birch
  - Betula schmidtii - Schmidt's birch
- chromosome number unknown
  - Betula leopoldae

== Subgenus Betula - Typical birches ==
Bark on twigs without methyl salicylate. Female catkins pendulous.

- Diploid (2n = 28).
  - Betula cordifolia - Heart-leaf birch or mountain paper birch
  - Betula pendula - Silver birch
  - Betula mandschurica - Manchurian birch
    - Betula mandschurica var. japonica - Japanese birch
  - Betula neoalaskana - Alaska birch or Yukon birch
  - Betula occidentalis - Water birch or red birch (B. fontinalis)
  - Betula platyphylla (Betula pendula var. platyphylla) - Siberian silver birch
  - Betula populifolia - Gray birch
  - Betula szechuanica (Betula pendula var. szechuanica) - Sichuan birch
- Tetraploid (4n = 56).
  - Betula celtiberica - Iberian white birch
  - Betula pubescens - White birch, European white birch or downy birch
    - Betula pubescens subsp. tortuosa - Arctic white birch
- Pentaploid (5n = 70).
  - Betula kenaica - Kenai birch
- Hexaploid (6n = 84).
  - Betula papyrifera - Paper birch, canoe birch or American white birch (sometimes tetraploid or pentaploid)

== Subgenus Chamaebetula - Dwarf birches ==
Small shrubs with small rounded leaves. Female catkins pendulous.

- Diploid (2n = 28).
  - Betula glandulosa (B. nana subsp. glandulosa) - American dwarf birch
  - Betula nana - Dwarf birch
- Tetraploid (4n = 56).
  - Betula minor - Quebec dwarf birch
  - Betula pumila - Swamp birch
- chromosome number not reported
  - Betula fruticosa -
  - Betula gmelinii -
  - Betula hallii - Cascades dwarf birch
  - Betula humilis - Arctic dwarf birch
  - Betula michauxii - Newfoundland dwarf birch
  - Betula microphylla -
  - Betula middendorffii -

== Notes ==
There is no consensus at all on species limits in Betula, with different authors differing wildly in what species they accept, from under 30 species, to over 60. The above (incomplete) list was compiled from the references cited below. Birches will hybridise very freely, particularly in cultivation but also in the wild where conditions and species present permit. While differing chromosome number (diploid, tetraploid, etc.) may reduce interbreeding, it is not an absolute bar to it. Many botanists regard differing chromosome number as a specific discriminant, though not all do so (e.g. some include B. cordifolia and B. neoalaskana as varieties within B. papyrifera).

== See also ==
- Birch
