= Bedgebury =

Bedgebury may refer to the following places in Kent, England:

- Bedgebury Cross, hamlet in the civil parish of Goudhurst
- Bedgebury Forest, forest surrounding Bedgebury National Pinetum
- Bedgebury National Pinetum, recreational and conservational arboretum
