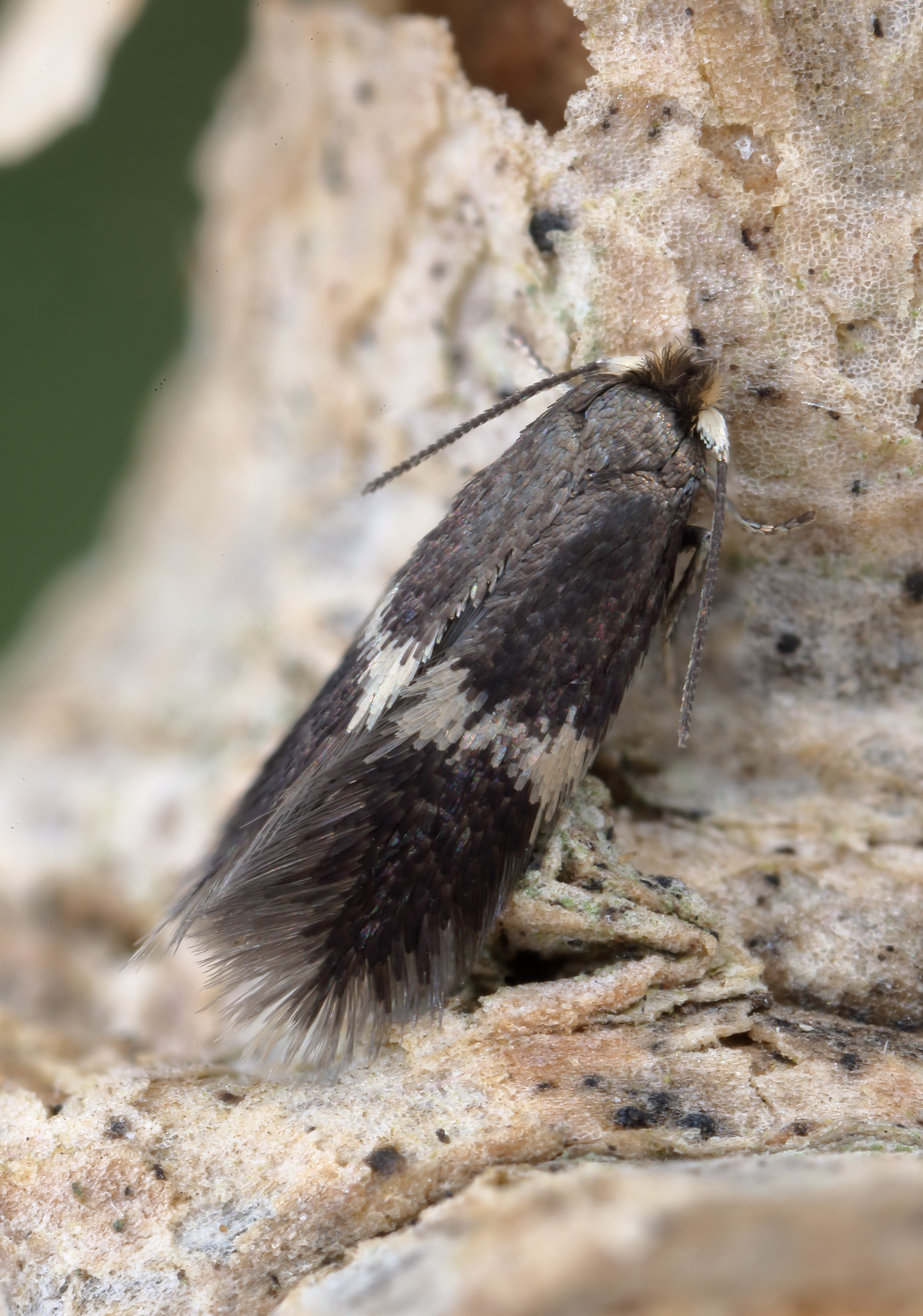

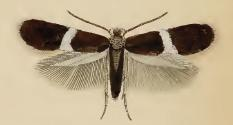

Scientific classification
- Kingdom: Animalia
- Phylum: Arthropoda
- Class: Insecta
- Order: Lepidoptera
- Family: Nepticulidae
- Genus: Ectoedemia
- Species: E. occultella

Binomial name
- Ectoedemia occultella (Linnaeus, 1767)

Synonyms
- Phalaena occultella Linnaeus, 1767; Lyonetia argentipedella Zeller, 1839; Nepticula flexuosella Fologne, 1859; Tinea mediofasciella Haworth, 1828; Tinea mucidella Hubner, 1817; Tinea strigilella Thunberg, 1794; Nepticula lindquisti Freeman, 1962; Ectoedemia lindquisti

= Ectoedemia occultella =

Species of moth

Ectoedemia occultella, the small birch leafminer, is a moth of the family Nepticulidae. It has a Holarctic distribution. It is found in most of Europe, east through Russia (where it has been recorded from Murmansk, Karelia, Leningrad, Samara and Tatarstan and Sakhalin) to Japan. It is also present in North America. Mines very similar to that of Ectoedemia occultella have been found on Rosaceae species in Nepal and Japan and these may belong to this species.

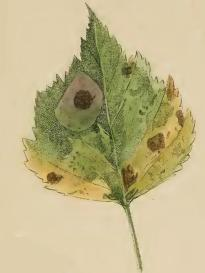
Mined birch leaf

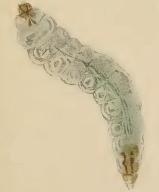
Larva

The wingspan is 5–7 mm. The head is grey, the face whitish. Forewings are light grey irrorated with dark fuscous and with a very indistinct oblique whitish fascia before middle, usually partly or wholly obsolete; a small tornal spot and larger triangular spot on costa somewhat beyond it ochreous-white. Hindwings grey.

Adults are on wing from May to July.

The larvae feed on Betula ermani, Betula grossa, Betula humilis, Betula nana, Betula obscura, Betula pendula and Betula pubescens. It has also been recorded from Salix pentandra in Finland. They mine the leaves of their host plant.
