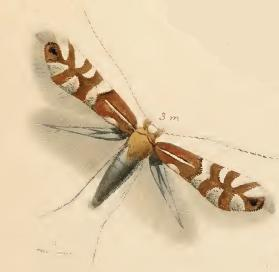

Scientific classification
- Kingdom: Animalia
- Phylum: Arthropoda
- Clade: Pancrustacea
- Class: Insecta
- Order: Lepidoptera
- Family: Gracillariidae
- Genus: Phyllonorycter
- Species: P. ulmifoliella

Binomial name
- Phyllonorycter ulmifoliella (Hubner, 1817)

Synonyms
- Tinea ulmifoliella Hubner, 1817; Lithocolletis ulmifoliella

= Phyllonorycter ulmifoliella =

Species of moth

Phyllonorycter ulmifoliella is a moth of the family Gracillariidae. It is found in all of Europe (except the Iberian Peninsula and the Balkan Peninsula), east to Russia and Japan.

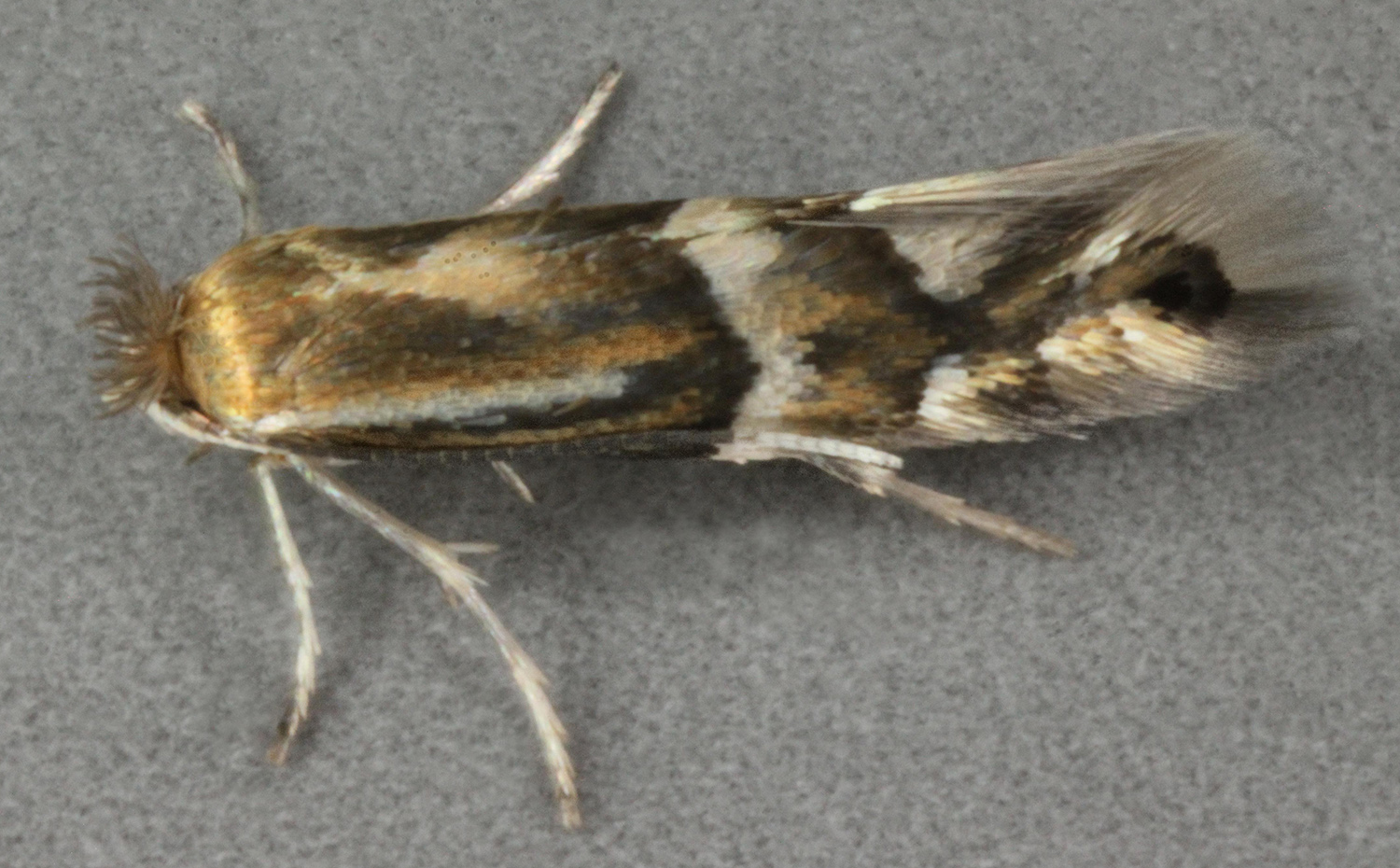
Phyllonorycter ulmifoliella, Llandegla moor, North Wales

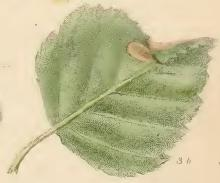
Mined birch leaf

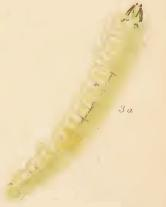
Larva

The wingspan is 7–9 mm. The head is golden-brownish, face white. Antennae with apex white. Forewings golden brownish; a shining white median streak from base to 2/5, dark margined above; an ill-defined white dorsal spot at 1/3; a somewhat angulated median fascia, three posterior costal and two dorsal triangular spots shining white, anteriorly dark margined; a black apical dot. Hindwings are rather dark grey. The larva is yellow-green; dorsal line greenish-grey; head pale brown. It is very similar to Phyllonorycter anderidae.

There are two generations per year with adults on wing in May and again in August.

The larvae feed on Betula x alpestris, Betula grossa, Betula pendula and Betula pubescens. They mine the leaves of their host plant.
