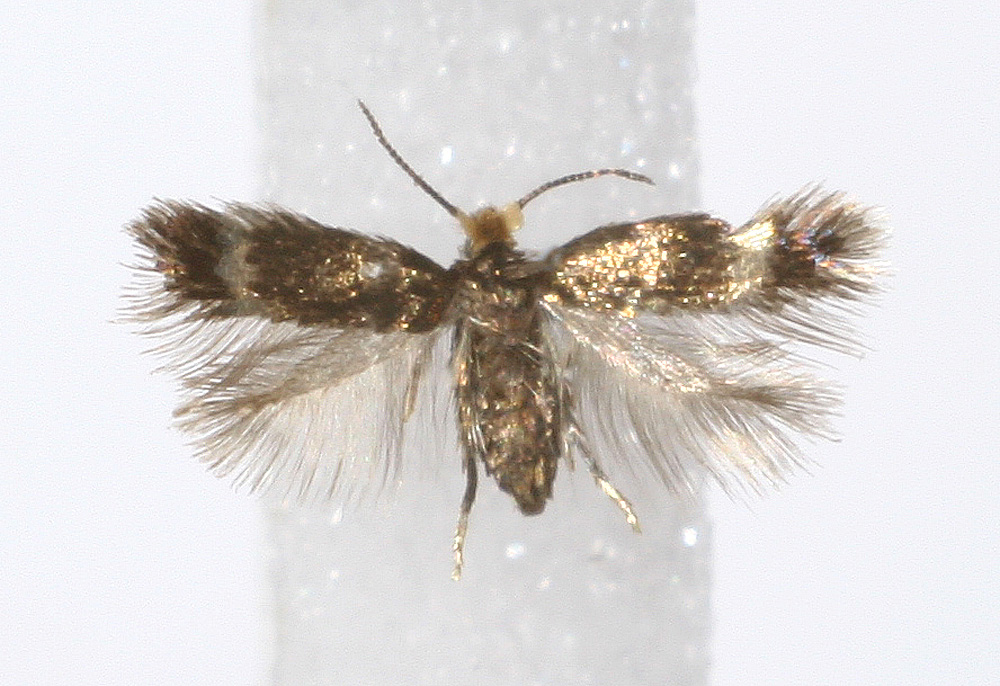

Scientific classification
- Kingdom: Animalia
- Phylum: Arthropoda
- Class: Insecta
- Order: Lepidoptera
- Family: Nepticulidae
- Genus: Stigmella
- Species: S. betulicola

Binomial name
- Stigmella betulicola (Stainton, 1856)

Synonyms
- Nepticula betulicola Stainton, 1856; Nepticula nanivora Petersen, 1930

= Stigmella betulicola =

Species of moth

Stigmella betulicola is a moth of the family Nepticulidae. It is found in most of Europe (except Iceland, the Iberian Peninsula and most of the Balkan Peninsula), east to the eastern part of the Palearctic realm.

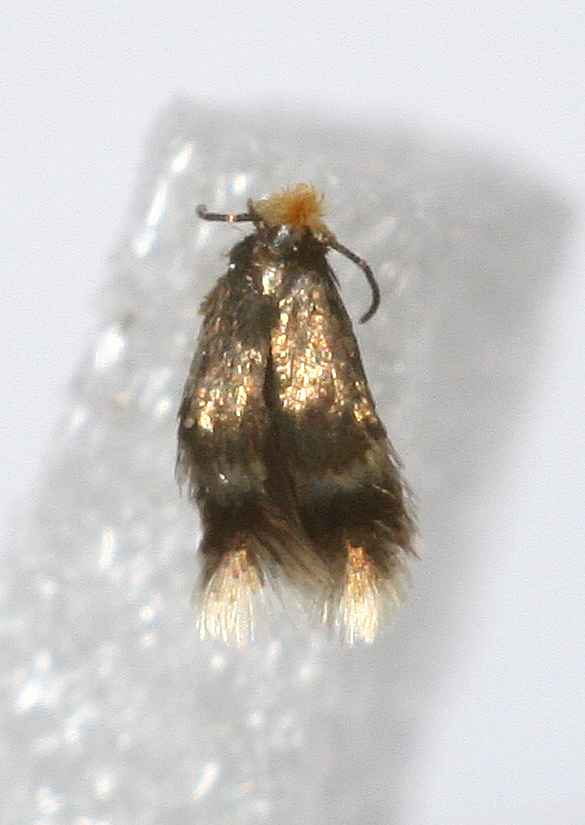

The wingspan is 3.4-4.6 mm.bronze-coloured moth. The antennae is filamentous, dark and barely half as long as the forewing. The innermost, greatly expanded joint is white. The head is yellow-haired, the body dark. The forewings are glistening, bronze-brown with a rather broad, silvery-white transverse band about two-thirds of the wing. The hind wing is narrow, gray, with long fringes. The species is very similar to several other Stigmella species and cannot be determined with certainty from external appearances alone.Genitalic preparation and microscopic examination is essential. Meyrick - The head in male is ochreous yellowish, in female more orange, collar light yellowish. Antennal eyecaps yellow -whitish. Forewings shining deep purplish bronze; a shining golden -silvery fascia about 3/4 apical area beyond this deep fuscous-purple. Hindwings grey.

Adults are on wing in May and again in August. There are two generations per year.

The larvae feed on Betula species, including Betula pubescens, Betula pendula, Betula humilis and Betula nana. They mine the leaves of their host.
