= William Dallimore =

English botanist (1871–1959)

- Born: 31 March 1871; Tardebigge, Worcestershire
- Died: 7 November 1959 (aged 88); Tonbridge, Kent
- Citizenship: United Kingdom
- Known for: A Handbook of Coniferae and Ginkgoaceae
- Awards: Veitch Memorial Medal (1924); Victoria Medal of Honour (1931)
- Scientific career
- Fields: arboriculture; forestry; botany
- Institutions: Royal Botanic Gardens, Kew

William Dallimore (31 March 1871 – 7 November 1959) was an English botanist who published a Handbook of Coniferae and who played an important role in the start and development of Bedgebury Pinetum.

== Career ==
William Dallimore began his career at the Royal Botanic Gardens, Kew as a student gardener in January 1891. He started working in the arboretum, and was appointed propagator in 1892 and assistant curator (at that time called foreman) in 1896. He devoted special attention to the conifers.

In 1909 Dalllimore was transferred to the Museum staff of Kew. He initiated a museum of forestry, which developed into the Wood Museum later. In 1926 he became the keeper of the Museums of Economic Botany.

== Handbook on Coniferae ==
The Handbook of Coniferae and Ginkgoaceae was first published in 1923 and remained a standard work for more than forty years. It was written in cooperation with Albert Bruce Jackson, who prepared the Keys to Genera and Species for the first two editions. The fourth edition (published in 1966, after Dallimore's death) was revised by Sydney Gerald Harrison.

An important characteristic of the Handbook is that it deals with conifers from the point of view of a gardener, forester and student, rather than a botanist. The trees are therefore described in as simple language as possible.

The book deals with all known species, and has quite extensive references to cultivars.

== Bedgebury Pinetum ==
Dallimore played a very important part in starting and developing the National Pinetum at Bedgebury in Kent, a joint undertaking of Kew and the Forestry Commission. He was the first to draw attention to the bad state of the conifers at Kew in the early 1920s. This finally led to the establishment of a new collection in a part of Bedgebury Forest, supervised by Dallimore. On his retirement from Kew in 1936, he moved to Kent, and continued to supervise the work at Bedgebury Pinetum, almost to the time of his death. Upon his death, he was survived by his two daughters.

== Bibliography ==
- Dallimore, W. & Thomas Moore (1908). Holly, yew and box: with notes on other evergreens. The Bodley Head / John Lane Cy, London / New York. 284 p. 115 ill.
- Dallimore, W & A. Bruce Jackson (1923/1966).A Handbook of Coniferae and Ginkgoaceae. First published 1923, second edition 1931, third edition 1948, reprinted 1954, reprinted with corrections 1961, fourth edition 1966 (rev. by S. G. Harrison). Edward Arnold Ltd, London
- Dallimore, W. (1926/1945). The pruning of trees and shrubs; being a description of the methods practised in the Royal Botanic Gardens, Kew. First published 1926, second impression 1927, third impression 1933, new edition 1945. Dulau, Oxford
- Dallimore, W., with illustrations by John Nash (1927). Poisonous plants, Deadly, Dangerous and Suspect.
- Dallimore, W. (1955/1961). 'The National Pinetum' in: An. (1955/1961) – Guide to the National Pinetum and Forest Plots at Bedgebury. Her Majesty's Stationery Office (2nd/3rd editions), p. 6 – 22 / 7 – 24)

== Literature ==
- Howes, F. N. (1959) – 'Mr. William Dallimore, I.S.O., V.M.H.' (obituary). In: Nature: international journal of science. London: MacMillan Journals, Volume 184, Issue 4700, pag. 1684. doi:10.1038/1841684b0
- Morgan, C. (2003) – 'The National Pinetum, Bedgebury: its History and Collections' in Proceedings of the 4th International Conifer Conference, Acta Horticulturae 615, sept. 2003, p. 269 – 272
