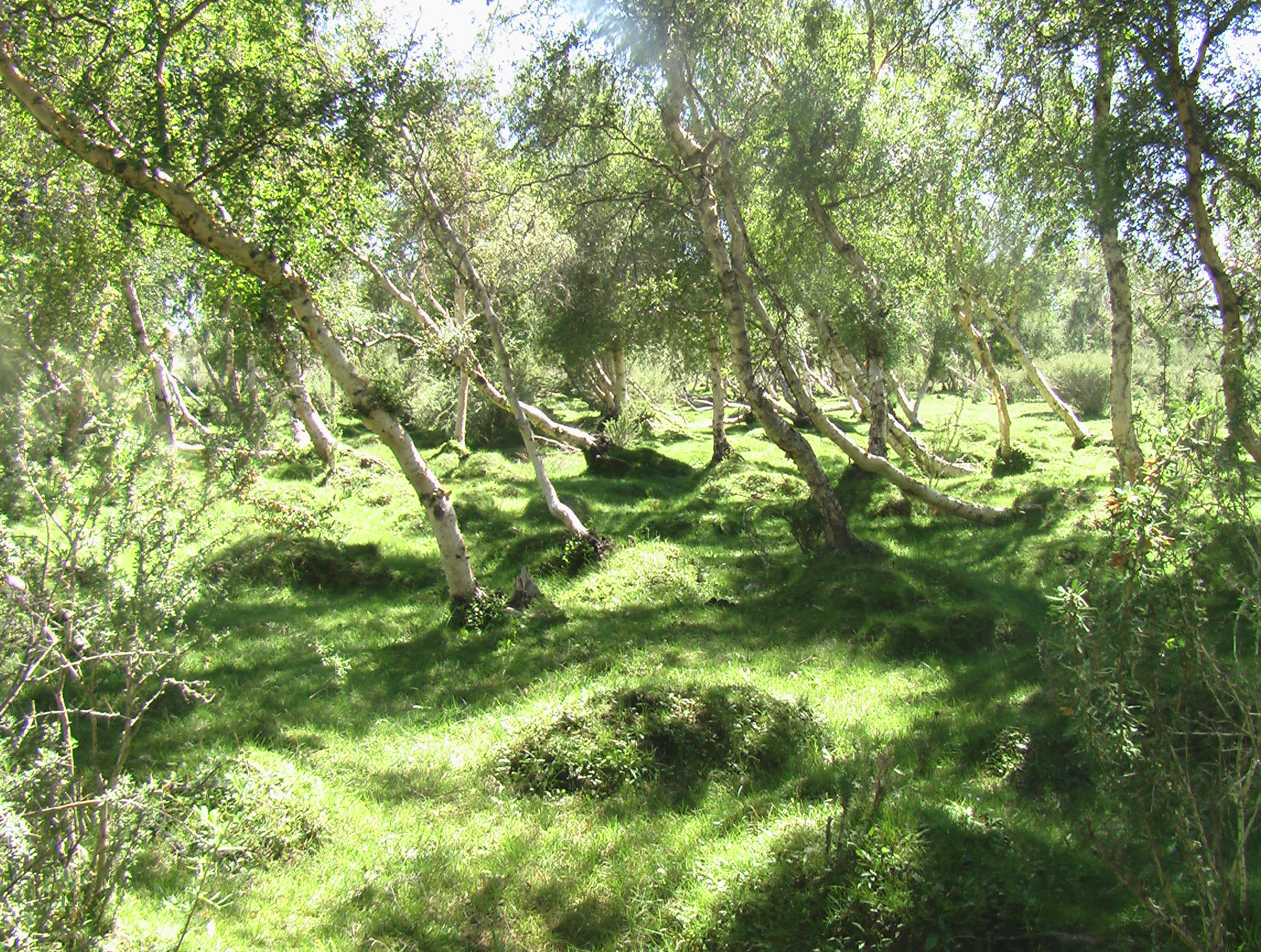

Conservation status
- Least Concern (IUCN 3.1)

Scientific classification
- Kingdom: Plantae
- Clade: Tracheophytes
- Clade: Angiosperms
- Clade: Eudicots
- Clade: Rosids
- Order: Fagales
- Family: Betulaceae
- Genus: Betula
- Subgenus: Betula subg. Betula
- Species: B. microphylla

Binomial name
- Betula microphylla Bunge

Synonyms
- Synonymy: Betula baranovii Sukaczev; Betula czatkalensis V.N.Vassil.; Betula derbetica P.A.Baranov; Betula derbetica var. amnicola P.A.Baranov; Betula fedtschenkoana V.N.Vassil.; Betula fruticosa var. cuneifolia Regel; Betula gordiaginii P.A.Baranov; Betula halophila Ching; Betula kelleriana Sukaczev; Betula microphylla var. baischanti P.A.Baranov; Betula microphylla var. caraganicola P.A.Baranov; Betula microphylla var. elongala P.A.Baranov; Betula microphylla var. laciniata P.A.Baranov; Betula microphylla var. lobatula P.A.Baranov; Betula microphylla var. monticola P.A.Baranov; Betula microphylla var. rezniczenkoana Litv.; Betula microphylla var. tumantica Chang Y.Yang & J.Wang; Betula pavlovii P.A.Baranov; Betula pavlovii var. sagliana P.A.Baranov; Betula rezniczenkoana (Litv.) Schischk.; Betula rezniczenkoana var. gracillima P.A.Baranov; Betula rezniczenkoana var. litwinovii P.A.Baranov; Betula rezniczenkoana var. obiquesquamata P.A.Baranov; Betula rumnica P.A.Baranov; Betula tessingolica P.A.Baranov; Betula tumantica Chang Y.Yang & J.Wang; Betula turunica P.A.Baranov

= Betula microphylla =

Species of plant

Betula microphylla is a species of flowering plant in the Betulaceae family. It is a tree native to Kazakhstan, Kyrgyzstan, and Uzbekistan in Central Asia; the Altai Mountains, including the Altai, Buryatia, Krasnoyarsk, and Tuva regions of Russia; Xinjiang, and Mongolia. It is a multi-stemmed tree, up to six meters tall, which grows in temperate broadleaf forests and along streams in dry steppe valleys.

Betula microphylla is a tetraploid, placed in section Betula subgenus Betula. There are no clear morphological boundaries between it and the other tetraploid species B. tianschanica and B. ovalifolia, or the diploid B. humilis. All grow in open wetlands.
