= Betula michauxii =

Conservation status
- Least Concern (IUCN 3.1)

Scientific classification
- Kingdom: Plantae
- Clade: Embryophytes
- Clade: Tracheophytes
- Clade: Angiosperms
- Clade: Eudicots
- Clade: Rosids
- Order: Fagales
- Family: Betulaceae
- Genus: Betula
- Subgenus: Betula subg. Chamaebetula
- Species: B. michauxii

Binomial name
- Betula michauxii Spach

Synonyms
- Apterocaryon michauxii (Spach) Opiz; Betula nana var. michauxii (Spach) Regel; Betula terrae-novae Fernald

Species of flowering plant

Betula michauxii, the Newfoundland dwarf birch, is a species of birch which is native to Newfoundland, Nova Scotia and Quebec as well as Saint Pierre and Miquelon. It is a perennial herb.

== Description ==
The species is 0.5 metres (1 ft 8 in) tall and have a wintergreen smell. The leaves are obovate and have a glabrous surface. Infructescence is cylindric, erect, short, and 0.5–0.8 centimetres (0.20–0.31 in) long. The fruits ripen by fall and are as glabrous as the leaves. Its habitats include sphagnum bogs, around pools, and wet peaty meadows.
