= Albert Bruce Jackson =

British dendrologist (1876-1947)

Albert Bruce Jackson (14 February 1876, in Newbury, Berkshire – 14 January 1947, in Kew) was a British botanist and dendrologist. He worked as an assistant the Royal Botanic Gardens, Kew from 1907 to 1910 and later at the British Museum from 1932 to his death in 1947.

== Partial bibliography ==
- Catalogue of Hardy Trees and Shrubs Growing in the Grounds of Syon House. 1910.
- Catalogue of Hardy Trees and Shrubs growing at Albury Park, Surrey. 1913. hdl:2027/mdp.39015059783996.
- Catalogue of the Trees and Shrubs [at Westonbirt] in the Collection of the Late Lieut.-Col. Sir George Lindsay Holford. 1927. hdl:2027/mdp.39015015202214.
- A Handbook of Coniferæ including Ginkgoaceæ with William Dallimore, 1923
- Catalogue of the Trees and Shrubs (excluding Rhododendrons) at Borde Hill. 1935.
- Identification of Conifers, 1946
