= Betula minor =

Conservation status
- Apparently Secure (NatureServe)

Scientific classification
- Kingdom: Plantae
- Clade: Tracheophytes
- Clade: Angiosperms
- Clade: Eudicots
- Clade: Rosids
- Order: Fagales
- Family: Betulaceae
- Genus: Betula
- Subgenus: Betula subg. Chamaebetula
- Species: B. minor

Binomial name
- Betula minor (Tuck.) Fernald

Species of flowering plant

Betula minor, the dwarf white birch, is a species of birch which can be found in Eastern Canada and in such US states as Maine, New Hampshire, and New York.
