= Betula globispica =

Conservation status
- Near Threatened (IUCN 3.1)

Scientific classification
- Kingdom: Plantae
- Clade: Embryophytes
- Clade: Tracheophytes
- Clade: Angiosperms
- Clade: Eudicots
- Clade: Rosids
- Order: Fagales
- Family: Betulaceae
- Genus: Betula
- Subgenus: Betula subg. Betulenta
- Species: B. globispica

Binomial name
- Betula globispica Shirai

Species of plant

Betula globispica, is a species of birch native to Japan, where it grows naturally in the mountains of central Japan. Though rare in nature, saplings were planted at the Royal Botanic Gardens, Kew in 1957.
