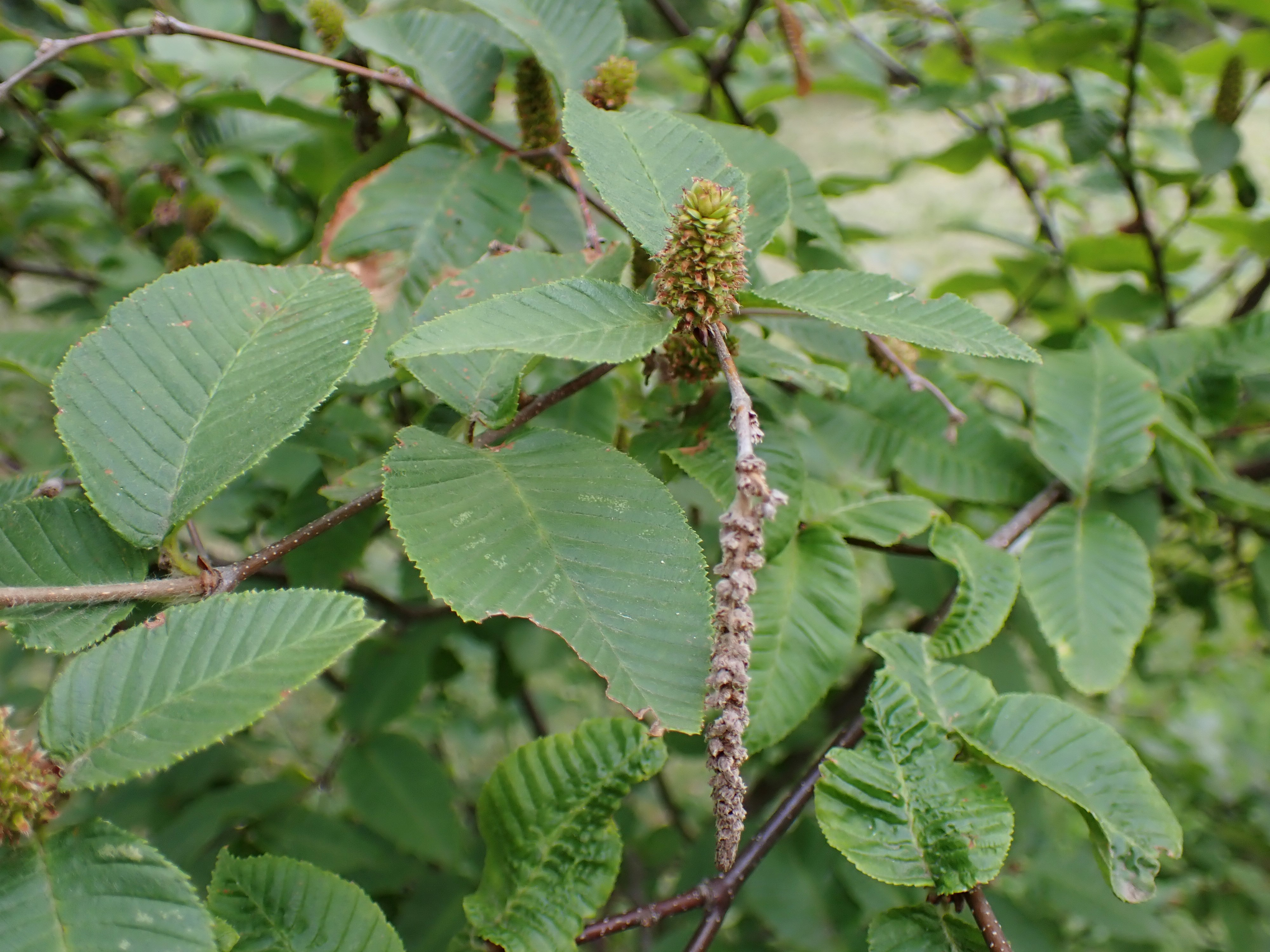
- Chichibu birch specimen at the Botanischer Garten Halle, Germany

Conservation status
- Critically Endangered (IUCN 3.1)

Scientific classification
- Kingdom: Plantae
- Clade: Tracheophytes
- Clade: Angiosperms
- Clade: Eudicots
- Clade: Rosids
- Order: Fagales
- Family: Betulaceae
- Genus: Betula
- Species: B. chichibuensis

Binomial name
- Betula chichibuensis H.Hara

= Betula chichibuensis =

Species of birch

Betula chichibuensis, commonly known as Chichibu birch (Chichibu-Minebari in Japanese), is a species of birch native exclusively to limestone outcrops in the Okuchichibu and Kitakami Mountains of central and northeast Honshu, Japan. The tree is rated as Critically Endangered on the IUCN Red List due to its extreme rarity and limited range.

In 1993, only 21 B. chichibuensis trees existed in the wild. Although several other small populations of the tree were discovered in the 2010s, including the Kitakami populations, the Chichibu birch remains very rare. Ex situ conservation efforts to prevent the species' extinction are ongoing, including at the University of Liverpool's Ness Botanic Gardens and the Bedgebury National Pinetum.

== Description ==
Betula chichibuensis is a multi-stemmed shrub or small deciduous tree that reaches 8–10 meters (26–33 ft) tall in the wild and about 5 meters (16 feet) tall in captivity. The Chichibu birch is very long-lived due to its sprouting habit, but its self-incompatibility means two individuals must be close enough together to cross-pollinate, making seed production unreliable in smaller populations.

The bark of the Chichibu birch is light brown and flaky with horizontal lenticels. Twigs from it are nearly hairless and can reach up to 3 mm in diameter. The leaves are alternately placed on the stem, and their shape is ovate, acute, rounded or slightly cordate at the base. They are 30–75 mm long by 15–45 mm wide, glabrous and green on their upper surface, and have white hairs on the underside. They have up to 18 pairs of deep veins and are serrated, with 1–3 teeth between each tooth ending a secondary vein. Chichibu birch is monoecious: an individual has both male and female catkins. Female catkins are red-violet and erect, while male catkins expand in the spring with tiny nutlet fruits that are chestnut brown in color and about 0.15 mm wide.

== Taxonomy ==
Betula chichibuensis has relatively little taxonomic differences from its closest relatives, including Betula schmidtii and Betula chinensis, but its soft leaves with 18 pairs of veins make it visually distinct from other birches. Recent research in Japan has sought to assemble the full chloroplast genome of B. chichibuensis and further investigate its genetic structure.

== Distribution and habitat ==
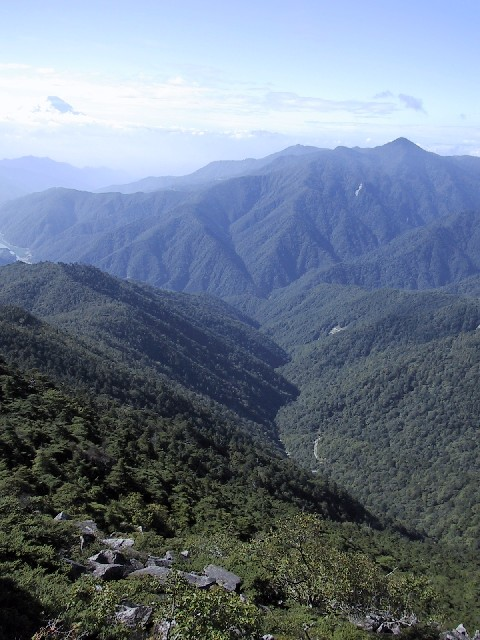
The Okuchichibu Mountains, where B. chichibuensis is found

Chichibu birches are extremely rare in the wild, growing only on a handful of limestone outcrops in the mountains of the Japanese island of Honshu. From their first description as a distinct species by Hiroshi Hara in 1965 up until roughly 2015, B. chichibuensis had been found exclusively in a single stand in the Okuchichibu Mountains (Chichibu Tama Kai National Park), where only 21 Chichibu birches were counted in 1993. As of 2017, at least eight additional small stands of B. chichibuensis were found by Dr. Toshihide Hirao, mostly in the Kitakami Mountains of northeast Honshu.

A 2014 expedition to the Okuchichibu Mountains location found B. chichibuensis growing on an exposed limestone mountain face near the Karisaka Tunnel, alongside plants including Sasa bamboo, Chamaecyparis obtusa cypresses, Juniperus rigida junipers, and Acer pictum maples.

== Conservation ==
Betula chichibuensis is considered a Critically Endangered species by the IUCN Red List. In addition to the Chichibu birch's self-incompatibility and low seed viability (around 1%, by some estimates), the species is also threatened by habitat degradation and deforestation in the Chichibu District, and its small population size makes it particularly vulnerable to natural disasters and disease.

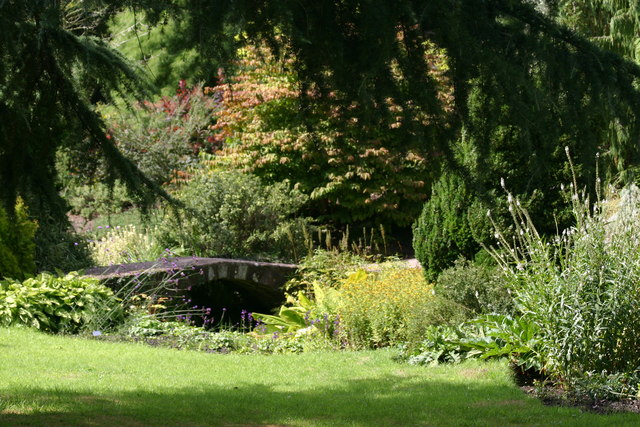
Ness Botanic Gardens, UK, site of the first B. chichibuensis ex situ conservation program outside Japan

Serious ex situ conservation efforts to prevent the Chichibu birch's extinction began in 1986, when Tetsuo Satomi collected seeds from the Okuchichibu Mountains site and sent them to Hugh McAllister, a botanist at the University of Liverpool's Ness Botanic Gardens. Eight of the seeds germinated, clippings from which were then used to create all Chichibu birches growing in captivity up until the 2010s. Cultivated specimens vary significantly in appearance, with some clones showing a spreading habit and others growing more upright.

In 2014, an Anglo-Japanese expedition to the Okuchichibu Mountains collected roughly 1,000 B. chichibuensis seeds (of which around 100 germinated) in order to increase the genetic diversity of cultivated specimens. As of 2015, more than 30 gardens worldwide grow Chichibu birches, including the Bedgebury National Pinetum and Harvard University's Arnold Arboretum. Specimens at the Ness Botanic Gardens have been reported to have seed viabilities of up to 40 percent.
