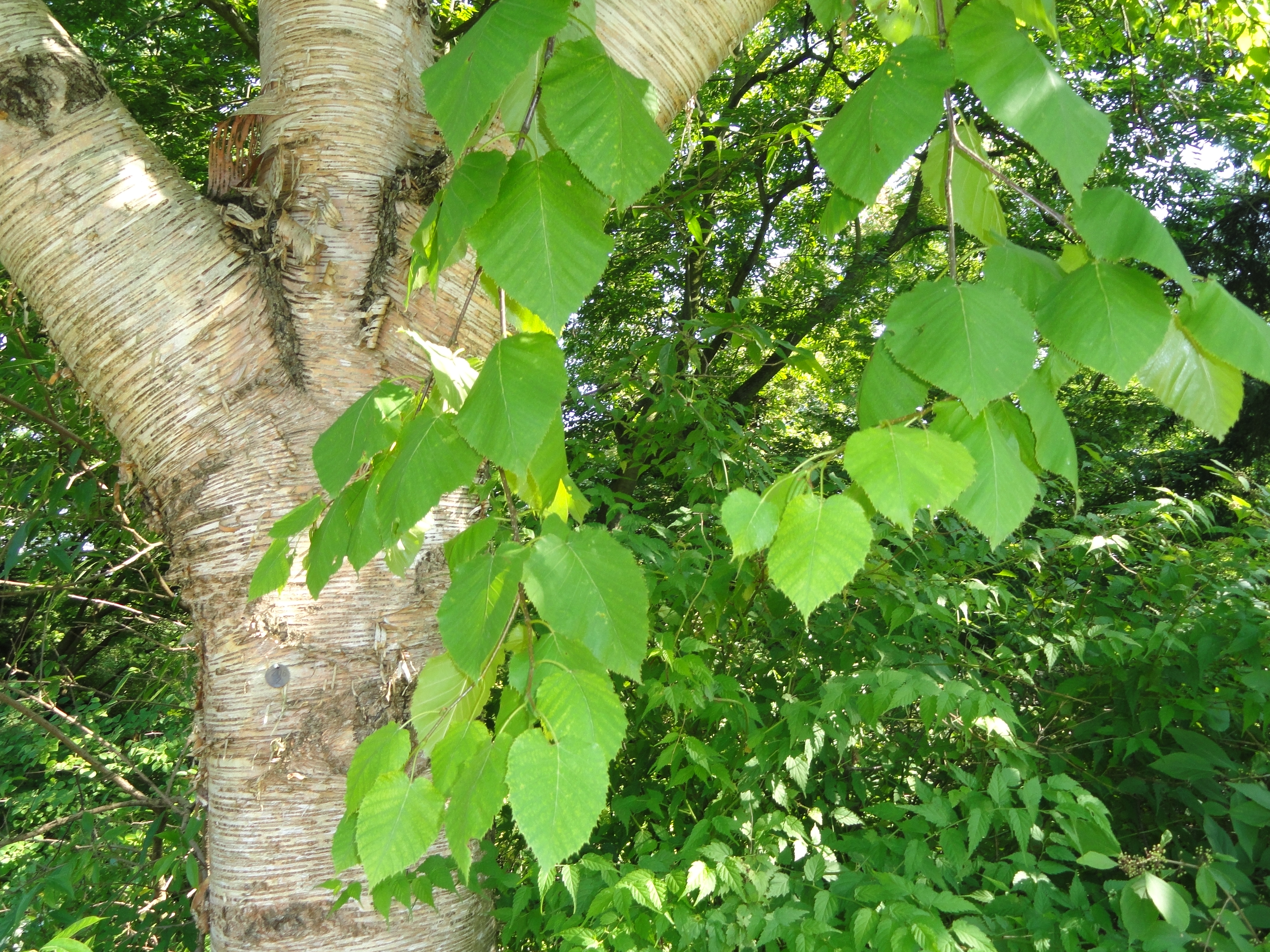
- Leaves and bark

Conservation status
- Least Concern (IUCN 3.1)

Scientific classification
- Kingdom: Plantae
- Clade: Embryophytes
- Clade: Tracheophytes
- Clade: Angiosperms
- Clade: Eudicots
- Clade: Rosids
- Order: Fagales
- Family: Betulaceae
- Genus: Betula
- Subgenus: Betula subg. Betulaster
- Species: B. maximowicziana

Binomial name
- Betula maximowicziana Regel

Synonyms
- Betula candelae Koidz.; Betula maximowiczii Regel; Betula maximowiczii Rupr.

= Betula maximowicziana =

Species of birch tree

Betula maximowicziana, the monarch birch, is a species of birch tree native to the Kuril Islands and northern to central Japan. It is a valuable timber tree in Japan. It is also grown as an ornamental for its bark in Japan, Europe and a few places in North America, but has had limited acceptance due to lack of uniformity.
