= Phyllonorycter anderidae =

Scientific classification
- Domain: Eukaryota
- Kingdom: Animalia
- Phylum: Arthropoda
- Class: Insecta
- Order: Lepidoptera
- Family: Gracillariidae
- Genus: Phyllonorycter
- Species: P. anderidae

Binomial name
- Phyllonorycter anderidae (W. Fletcher, 1885)

Synonyms
- Lithocolletis anderidae W. Fletcher, 1885

Species of moth

Phyllonorycter anderidae is a moth of the family Gracillariidae. The species was first described by W. H. B. Fletcher in 1885. It is found from Fennoscandia and northern Russia to Belgium, Austria and Ukraine and from Great Britain to southern Russia.

The wingspan is 5.5-6.5 mm. Adults are on wing in May and August in two generations.

The larvae feed on Betula humilis, Betula nana and Betula pubescens. They mine the leaves of their host plant.
