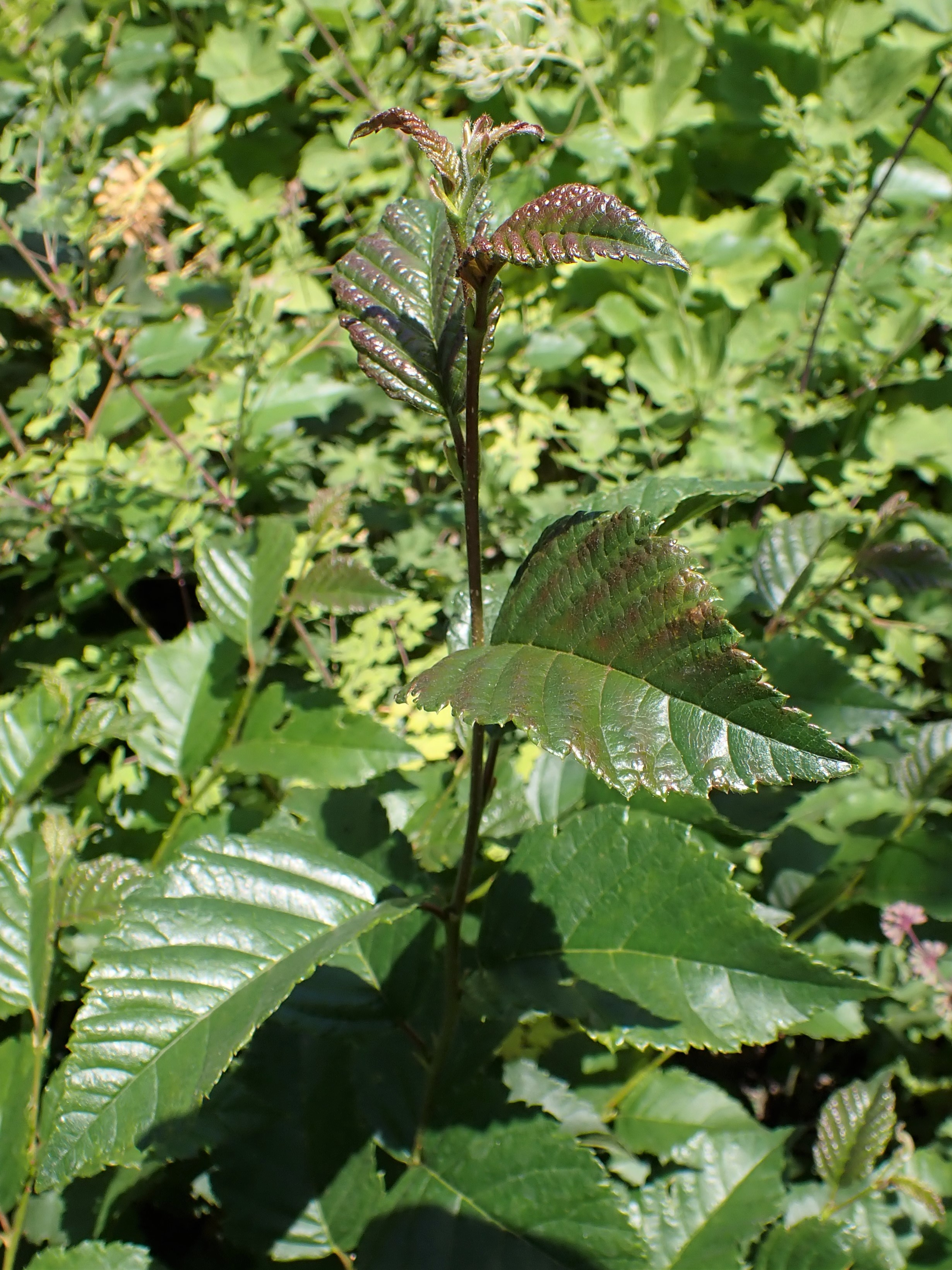
- Young leaves
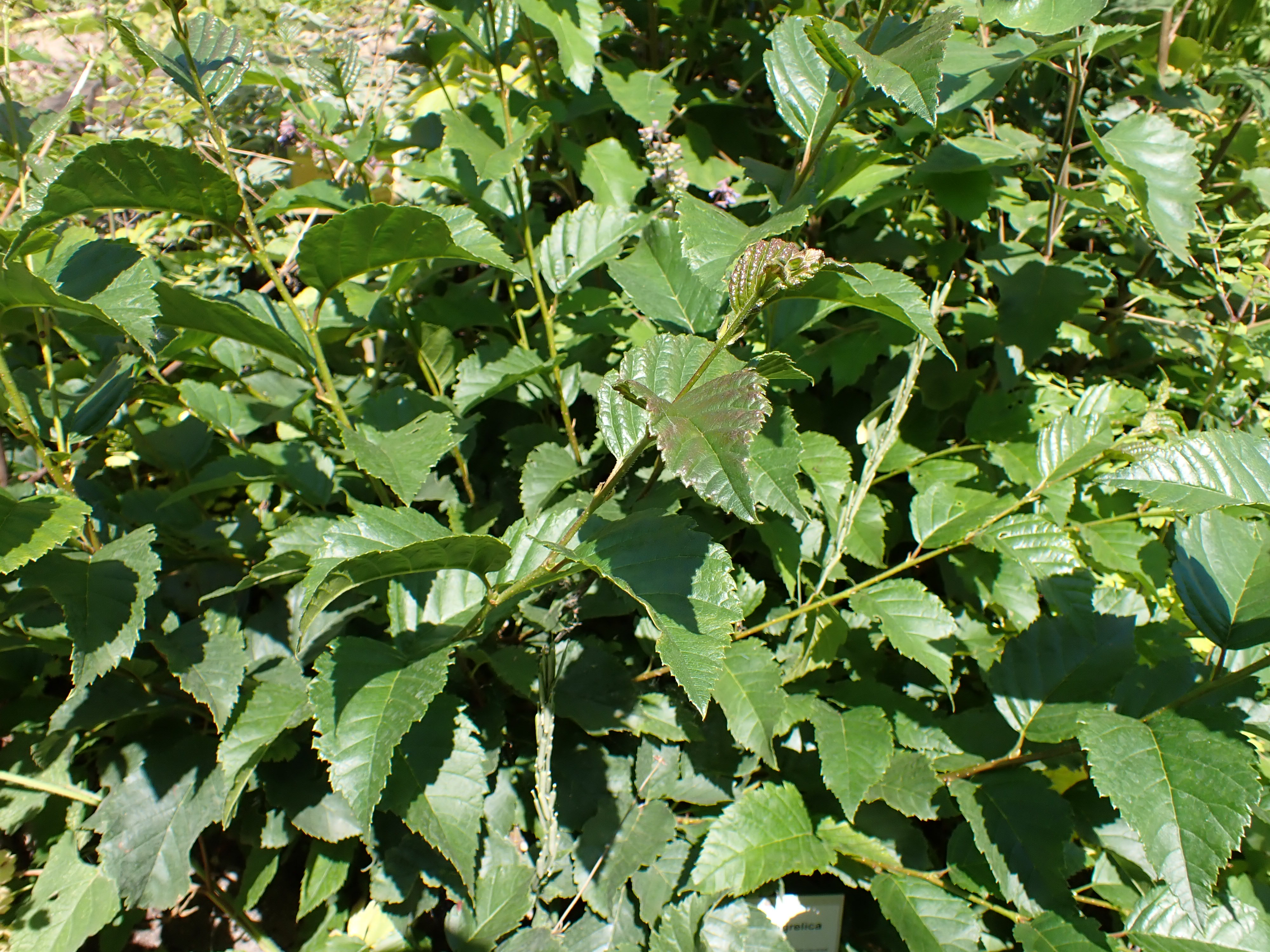
- Habit

Conservation status
- Endangered (IUCN 3.1)

Scientific classification
- Kingdom: Plantae
- Clade: Embryophytes
- Clade: Tracheophytes
- Clade: Angiosperms
- Clade: Eudicots
- Clade: Rosids
- Order: Fagales
- Family: Betulaceae
- Genus: Betula
- Species: B. megrelica

Binomial name
- Betula megrelica Sosn.

= Betula megrelica =

Species of plant

Betula megrelica, the Megrelian birch, is a very rare species of flowering plant in the family Betulaceae. It is native to western Georgia, and has only been found in two locations, Mt. Migaria and Mt. Jvari, in the Egrisi Range of the Caucasus Mountains. A shrub or small tree reaching 4 m (13 ft), it is typically found in thickets at elevations from 1,200 to 2,000 m (3,900 to 6,600 ft). A dodecaploid, it is in a clade with the decaploid B. medwediewii (Caucasian birch) and the diploid B. lenta (cherry birch, native to eastern North America). In spite of its rarity and endangered status, it is available from specialty nurseries.
