= Bedgebury Cross =

Hamlet in Kent, England

Coordinates: 51.08°N 00.44°E

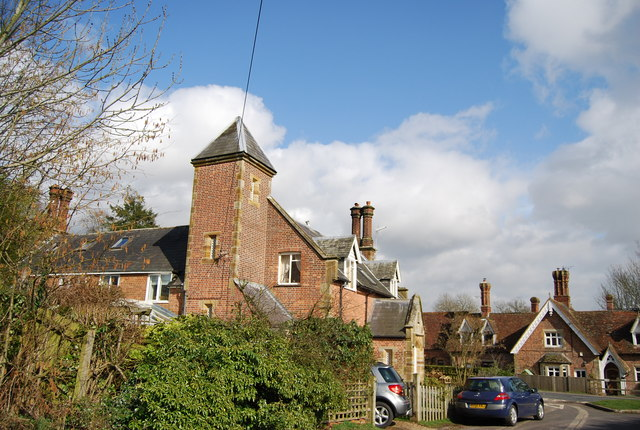
- View of Bedgebury Cross

- Location within Kent
- OS grid reference: TQ7134
- District: Tunbridge Wells
- Shire county: Kent
- Region: South East
- Country: England
- Sovereign state: United Kingdom
- Post town: Cranbrook
- Postcode district: TN17
- Police: Kent
- Fire: Kent
- Ambulance: South East Coast

Bedgebury Cross is a hamlet in the civil parish of Goudhurst. It is located in the Bedgebury Forest area of Kent, England, on the B2079 road connecting Goudhurst with the A21 road at Flimwell. The term cross refers to a wayside cross that originally existed at this site; this cross is replicated in the brickwork of the chimney of one of the cottages. Presumably the chimney was built over roughly the site of the cross.

Probably the most well-known Bedgeburian is Thomas Culpeper (c. 1514–1541), the lover of Queen Catherine Howard, who was King Henry VIII's fifth wife. Culpeper and Howard were both executed when the affair became known.
