= Betula austrosinensis =

Scientific classification
- Kingdom: Plantae
- Clade: Tracheophytes
- Clade: Angiosperms
- Clade: Eudicots
- Clade: Rosids
- Order: Fagales
- Family: Betulaceae
- Genus: Betula
- Subgenus: Betula subg. Betulenta
- Species: B. austrosinensis

Binomial name
- Betula austrosinensis Chun ex P.C.Li

Species of plant

Betula austrosinensis (Chinese: 华南桦; pinyin: hua nan hua) is a species of birch that is endemic to China where it is found on elevation of 700–1,900 metres (2,300–6,200 ft). It occurs in the broaded-leaved forests of southern China.

== Description ==
The tree is 25 metres (82 ft) high and is either brown or grayish-brown coloured. Branches are yellowish-brown in colour with elliptic, lanceolate, and oblong leaf blades which are 5–14 centimetres (2.0–5.5 in) long by 2–7 centimetres (0.79–2.76 in) wide. It petiole is 1–2 centimetres (0.39–0.79 in) long while the apex is acuminate. Females have one inflorescence which is erect and oblong, sometimes cylindrical, and is 2.5–6 centimetres (0.98–2.36 in) by 1.2–2.5 centimetres (0.47–0.98 in). It peduncle is 2–3 millimetres (0.079–0.118 in) long with the bracts length being 0.8–1.3 centimetres (0.31–0.51 in). The nutlet itself is elliptic and is 4–5 millimetres (0.16–0.20 in) long and 2 millimetres (0.079 in) wide. It also have membranous wings and it blooms from June to August while the flowers come out from May to June.
