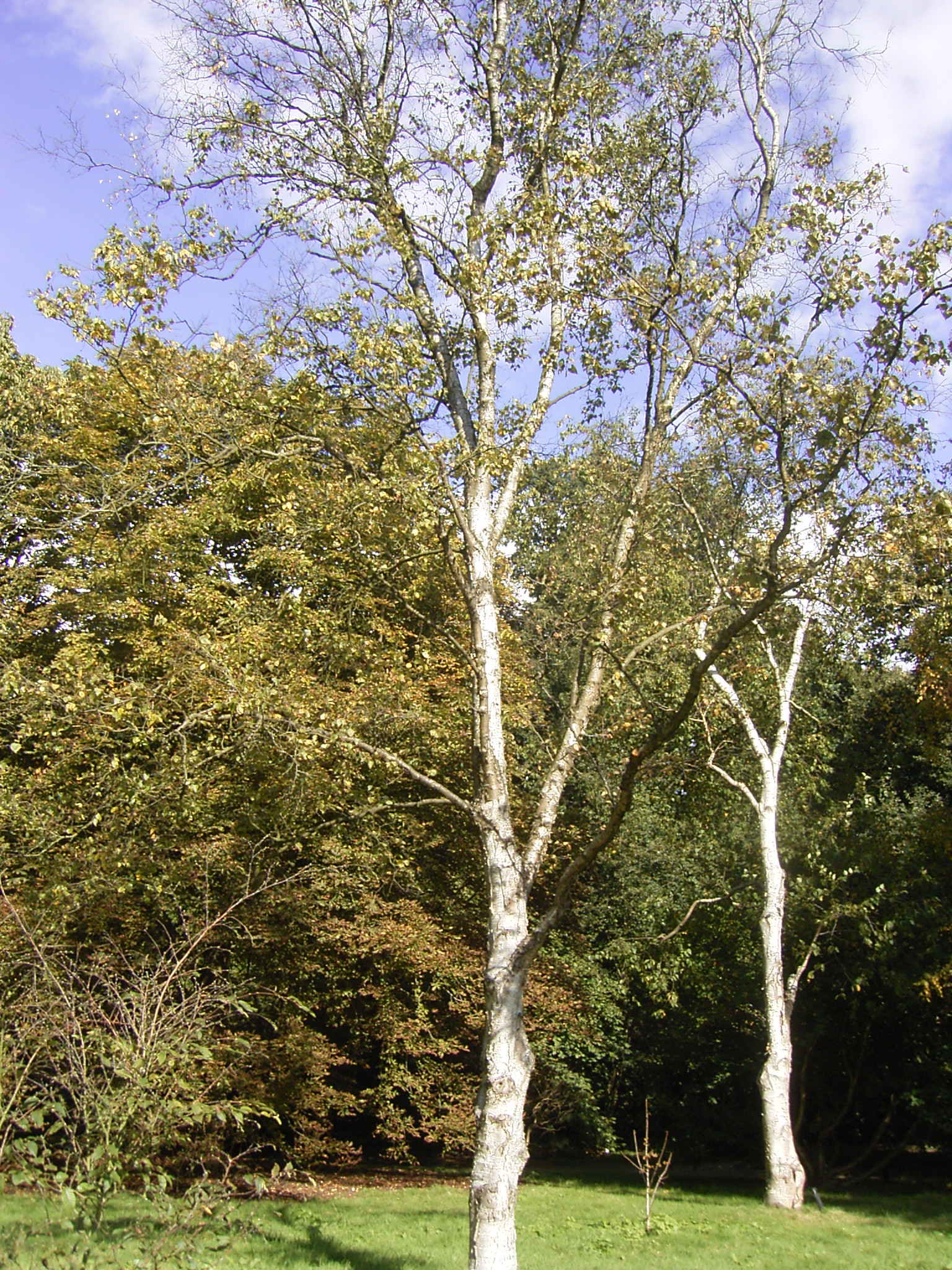

Scientific classification
- Kingdom: Plantae
- Clade: Tracheophytes
- Clade: Angiosperms
- Clade: Eudicots
- Clade: Rosids
- Order: Fagales
- Family: Betulaceae
- Genus: Betula
- Subgenus: Betula subg. Betula
- Species: B. platyphylla

Binomial name
- Betula platyphylla Sukaczev

= Betula platyphylla =

Species of birch

Betula platyphylla, the Asian white birch or Japanese white birch, is a tree species in the family Betulaceae. It can be found in subarctic and temperate Asia in Japan, China, Korea, Mongolia, the Russian Far East, and Siberia. It can grow to be 30 metres (100 feet) tall.
