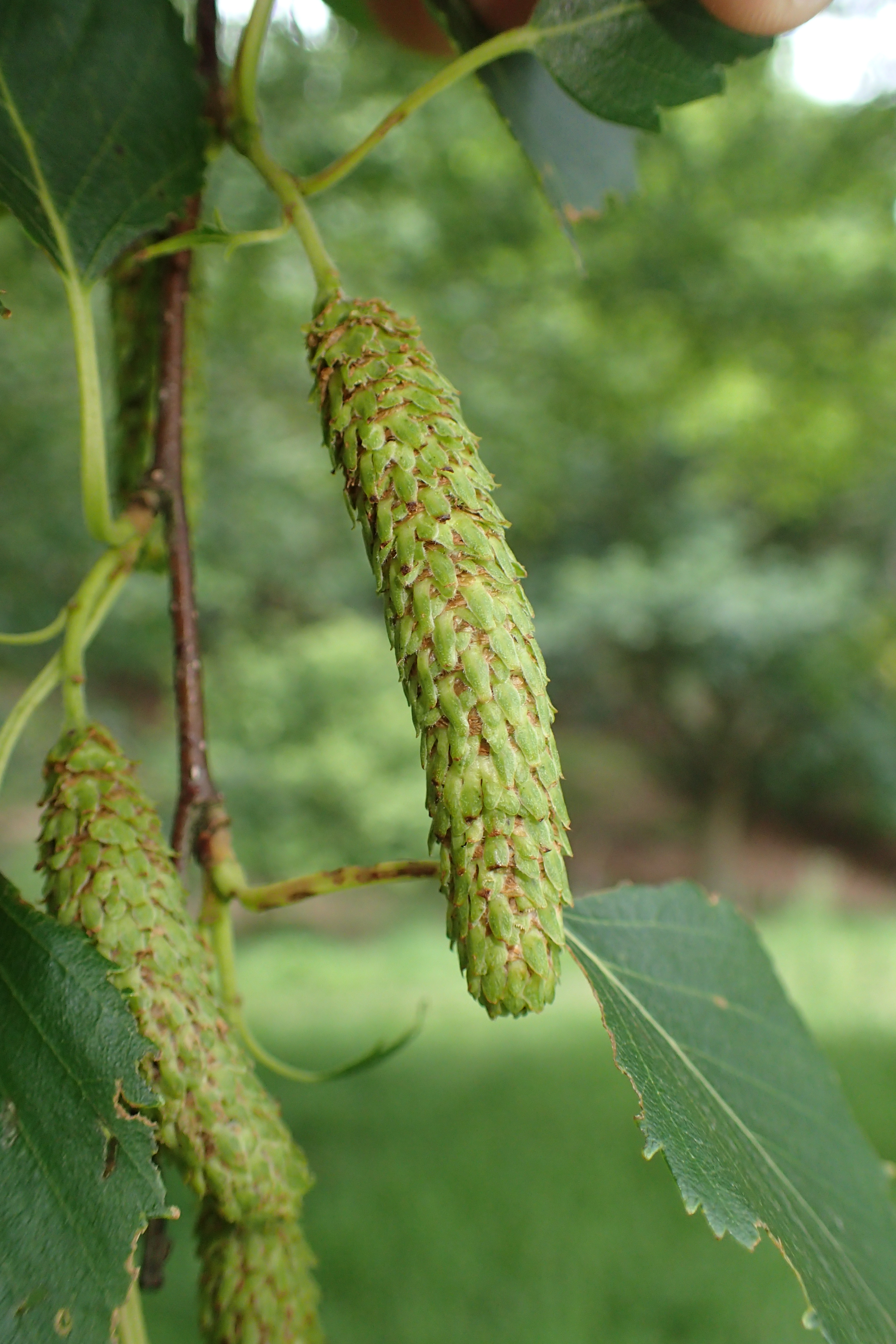

Scientific classification
- Kingdom: Plantae
- Clade: Tracheophytes
- Clade: Angiosperms
- Clade: Eudicots
- Clade: Rosids
- Order: Fagales
- Family: Betulaceae
- Genus: Betula
- Subgenus: Betula subg. Betula
- Species: B. kenaica

Binomial name
- Betula kenaica W. H. Evans

Synonyms
- Betula papyrifera var. kenaica (W.H.Evans.) Henry; Betula papyrifera subp. kenaica (W.H.Evans) A.E.Murray; Betula neoalaskana var. kenaica (W.H.Evans) B.Boivin

= Betula kenaica =

Species of flowering plant

Betula kenaica, or Kenai birch, is a species of birch that can be found in Alaska and northwestern North America up to 300 m (980 ft) above sea level.

== Description ==
It grows up to 12 m (39 ft) tall, with reddish-brown bark that may become pink or grayish-white. The leaf blades are ovate and grow in 2-6 pairs which are 4–5 cm (1.6–2.0 in) (sometimes up to 7.5 cm (3.0 in)) long and 2.5–4.5 cm (0.98–1.77 in) wide. The leaf margins are cuneated and serrated with rounded base and acute apex. The flowers bloom in late spring while fruits fall in autumn.

== Uses ==
The buds and twigs of the plant are used as a stew flavor while its inner bark can be eaten either raw or cooked and can be used as soup thickener. The sap can be used to make beer.
