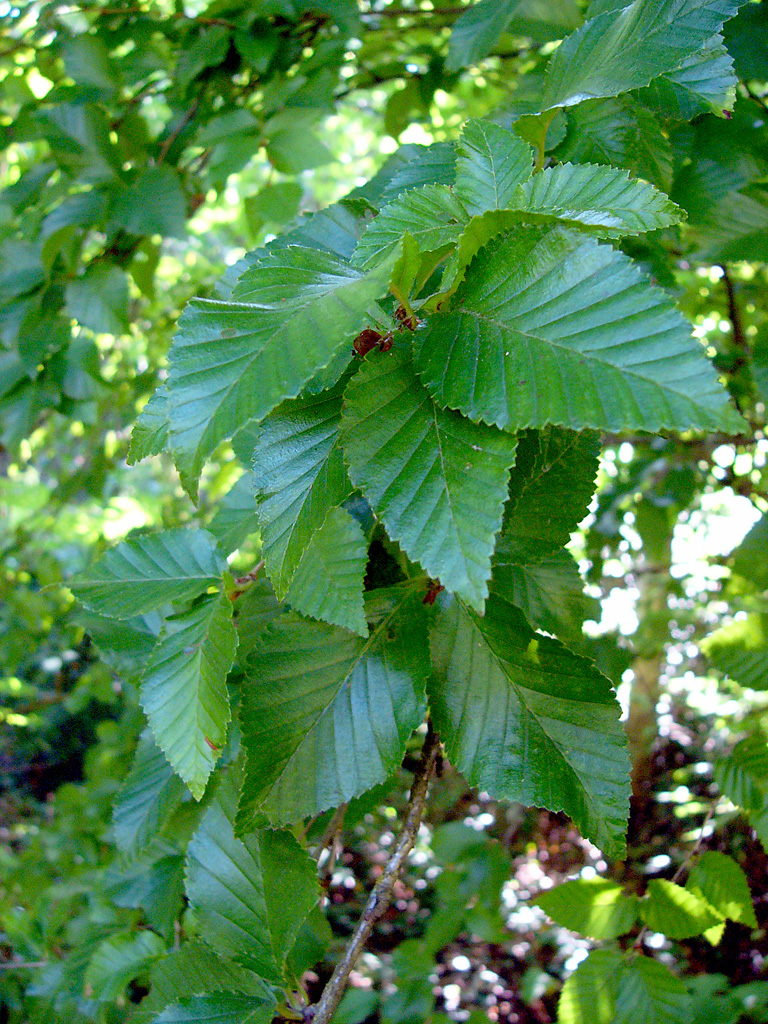

Conservation status
- Least Concern (IUCN 3.1)

Scientific classification
- Kingdom: Plantae
- Clade: Embryophytes
- Clade: Tracheophytes
- Clade: Angiosperms
- Clade: Eudicots
- Clade: Rosids
- Order: Fagales
- Family: Betulaceae
- Genus: Betula
- Subgenus: Betula subg. Aspera
- Species: B. chinensis

Binomial name
- Betula chinensis Maxim.

Synonyms
- Heterotypic Synonyms: Betula ceratoptera G.H.Liu & Ma; Betula chinensis var. angusticarpa H.J.P.Winkl.; Betula chinensis var. collina (Nakai) Uyeki; Betula chinensis var. lancifolia Nakai; Betula chinensis f. lancifolia (Nakai ex T.Mori) M.Kim; Betula chinensis f. linearisquama Hatus.; Betula chinensis var. linearisquama (Hatus.) S.L.Tung; Betula chinensis var. nana Liou; Betula chinensis f. nana (Liou) Kitag.; Betula collina Nakai; Betula exaltata S.Moore; Betula fauriei H.Lév. ex Nakai; Betula jiaodongensis S.B.Liang; Betula liaotungensis A.I.Baranov

= Betula chinensis =

Species of plant

Betula chinensis, commonly known as dwarf small-leaf birch, is a species of birch in the family Betulaceae. It is native to China and Korea on the elevation of 700–3,000 metres (2,300–9,800 ft).

== Description ==
The species is 5 metres (16 ft) tall with either yellow or yellowish-brown colour. Leaf blade is elliptic and ovate with a diameter of 1.5–6 centimetres (0.59–2.36 in) by 1–5 centimetres (0.39–1.97 in). Female species have a subglobose inflorescence which is also oblong with a diameter of 1–2 centimetres (0.39–0.79 in) by 0.6–1.5 centimetres (0.24–0.59 in). It peduncle is 1–2 millimetres (0.039–0.079 in) long while its bracts can be as long as 5–9 millimetres (0.20–0.35 in). Flowers bloom from May to June while the fruits ripe from July to August.

== Taxonomy ==
Betula chinensis occurs in both hexaploid and octoploid forms. It appears to be a triple hybrid between B. calcicola, B. potaninii and B. chichibuensis. It is placed in section Asperae, subgenus Aspera.
