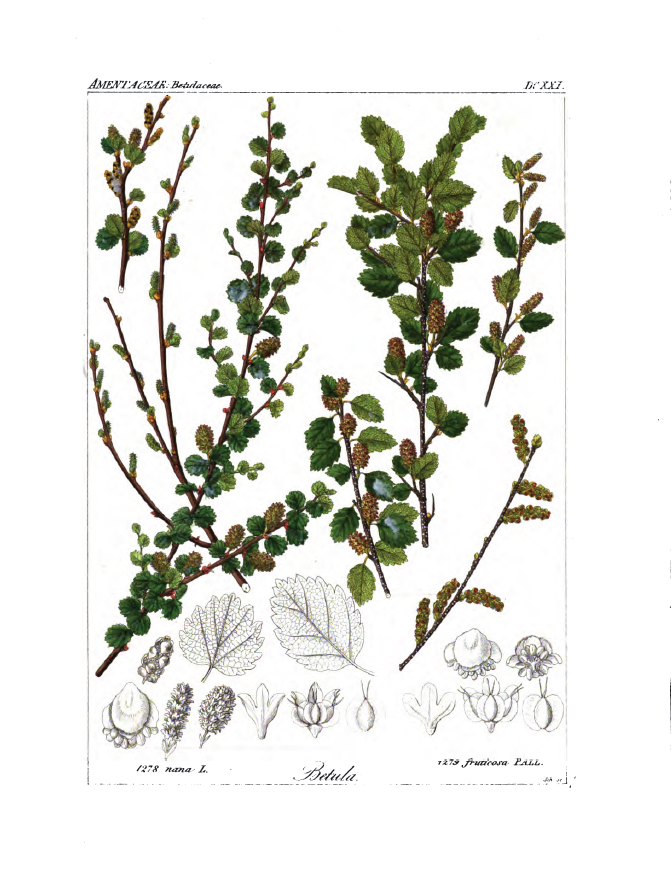
- Betula nana (left) and Betula fruticosa (right)

Conservation status
- Least Concern (IUCN 3.1)

Scientific classification
- Kingdom: Plantae
- Clade: Embryophytes
- Clade: Tracheophytes
- Clade: Angiosperms
- Clade: Eudicots
- Clade: Rosids
- Order: Fagales
- Family: Betulaceae
- Genus: Betula
- Subgenus: Betula subg. Chamaebetula
- Species: B. fruticosa

Binomial name
- Betula fruticosa Pall.

Synonyms
- Synonymy: Betula adasii T.V.Egorova & Sipliv.; Betula baicalensis Sukaczev; Betula baicalensis f. obscura Popov; Betula cyclophylla Nakai; Betula evenkiensis Polozhij; Betula fruticosa subsp. fusca (Pall. ex Georgi) M.Schemberg; Betula fruticosa var. fusenensis (Nakai) Liou; Betula fusca Pall. ex Georgi; Betula fusenensis Nakai; Betula gmelinii var. zyzyphifolia (Z.Wang & S.L.Tung) G.H.Liu & E.W.Ma; Betula humilis var. kamtschatica Regel; Betula microphylla var. coreana Nakai; Betula middendorffii var. communis Trautv.; Betula middendorffii var. globosa Regel; Betula middendorffii var. henriettae Popov; Betula middendorffii var. nitida Regel; Betula substepposa V.N.Vassil.; Betula yoshimurae Miyabe & Tatew.; Betula zyzyphifolia Z.Wang & S.L.Tung

= Betula fruticosa =

Species of flowering plant

Betula fruticosa, commonly known as dwarf bog birch or Japanese bog birch (traditional Chinese: 柴樺; simplified Chinese: 柴桦; pinyin: chái huà) is a species of dwarf birch native to southern Siberia and the Russian Far East, northern China, Mongolia, Korea, and Japan. In Japan it is found only in Tokachi Subprefecture on the island of Hokkaido. In China it grows in Heilongjiang, Inner Mongolia, and the Changbai Mountains of Jilin.

== Description ==
It is a slender shrub with multiple stems growing two to three metres tall. It has glabrous branches that are either purplish-brown or grayish-black in colour. Petiole is 2–10 millimetres (0.079–0.394 in) long and is a hairless as the branches. The peduncle is 2–5 millimetres (0.079–0.197 in) long but can sometimes be even 10 millimetres (0.39 in). Female species have an oblong inflorescence which is erect as well. The bracts are ciliate, 4–7 millimetres (0.16–0.28 in) long, and have elliptic nutlets. The flowers bloom from June to July and the fruits ripe from July to August.

== Habitat ==
It grows on wet ground in peat bogs and boggy forests, streamsides, marshes, open subtundra forests, and on limestone rocks, typically from 600–1,100 metres (2,000–3,600 ft) elevation and at lower elevations at the northern end of its range. It grows in larch, larch-spruce, spruce-fir, and mixed forests. In northeastern Siberia and subalpine zones of mountains the species forms dwarf birch communities, typically mixed with cedar, Pinus pumila (Siberian dwarf pine or stlanik), and green alder. In subarctic areas it grows in river valleys and floodplain poplar forests, shrub thickets and steep slopes, and sheltered areas near the sea coast.
