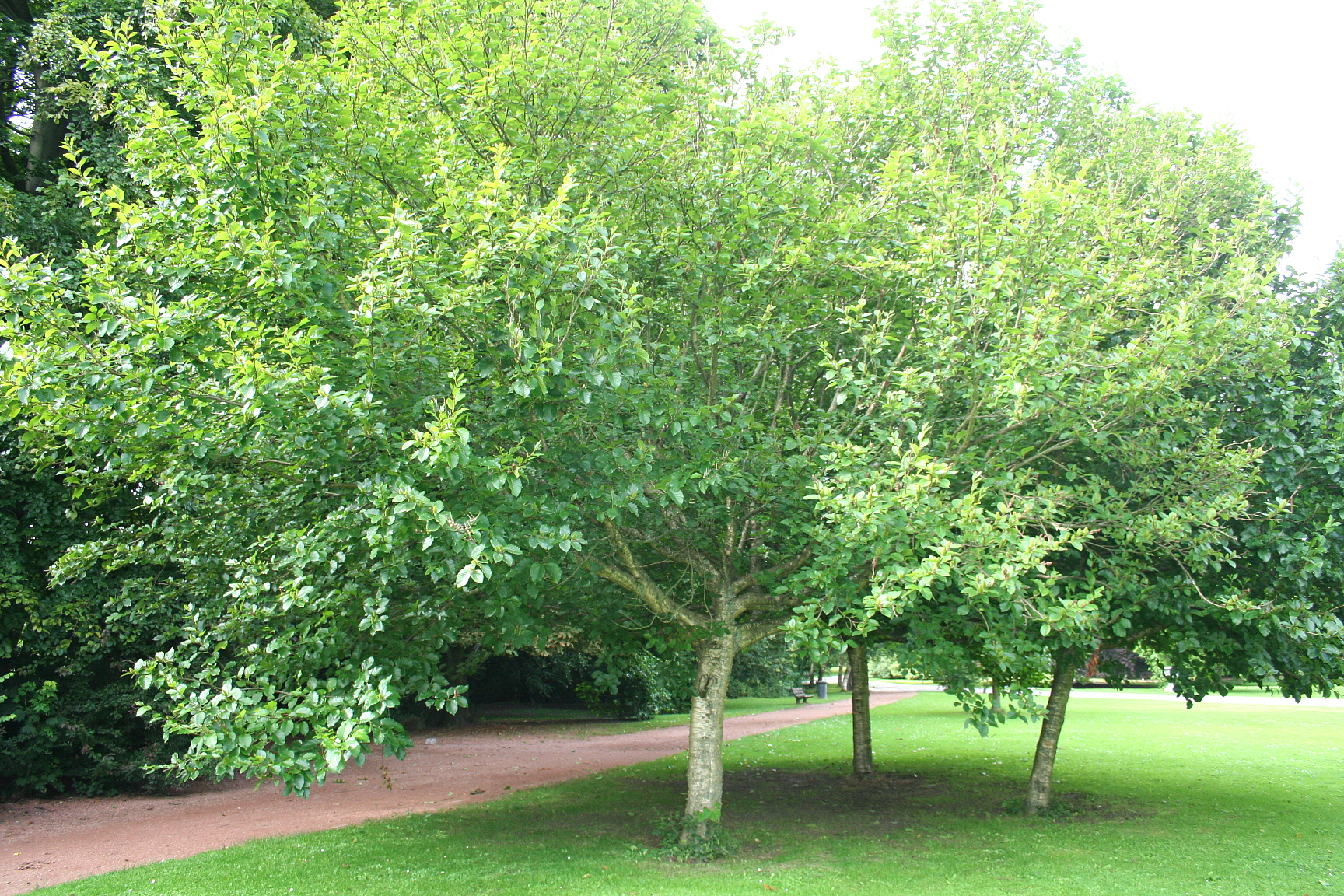
- B. medwediewii can be trained to take a standard growth form

Conservation status
- Data Deficient (IUCN 3.1)

Scientific classification
- Kingdom: Plantae
- Clade: Embryophytes
- Clade: Tracheophytes
- Clade: Angiosperms
- Clade: Eudicots
- Clade: Rosids
- Order: Fagales
- Family: Betulaceae
- Genus: Betula
- Subgenus: Betula subg. Aspera
- Species: B. medwediewii

Binomial name
- Betula medwediewii Regel

= Betula medwediewii =

Species of flowering plant

Betula medwediewii, called Transcaucasian birch, Caucasian birch or Medwediew's birch, is a species of birch which is native to Turkey, Georgia, and Iran. It is decaploid, with its closest diploid relatives being Betula humilis and probably Betula lenta from eastern North America. It is placed in section Lentae, subgenus Aspera. Its cultivar 'Gold Bark' has gained the Royal Horticultural Society's Award of Garden Merit.

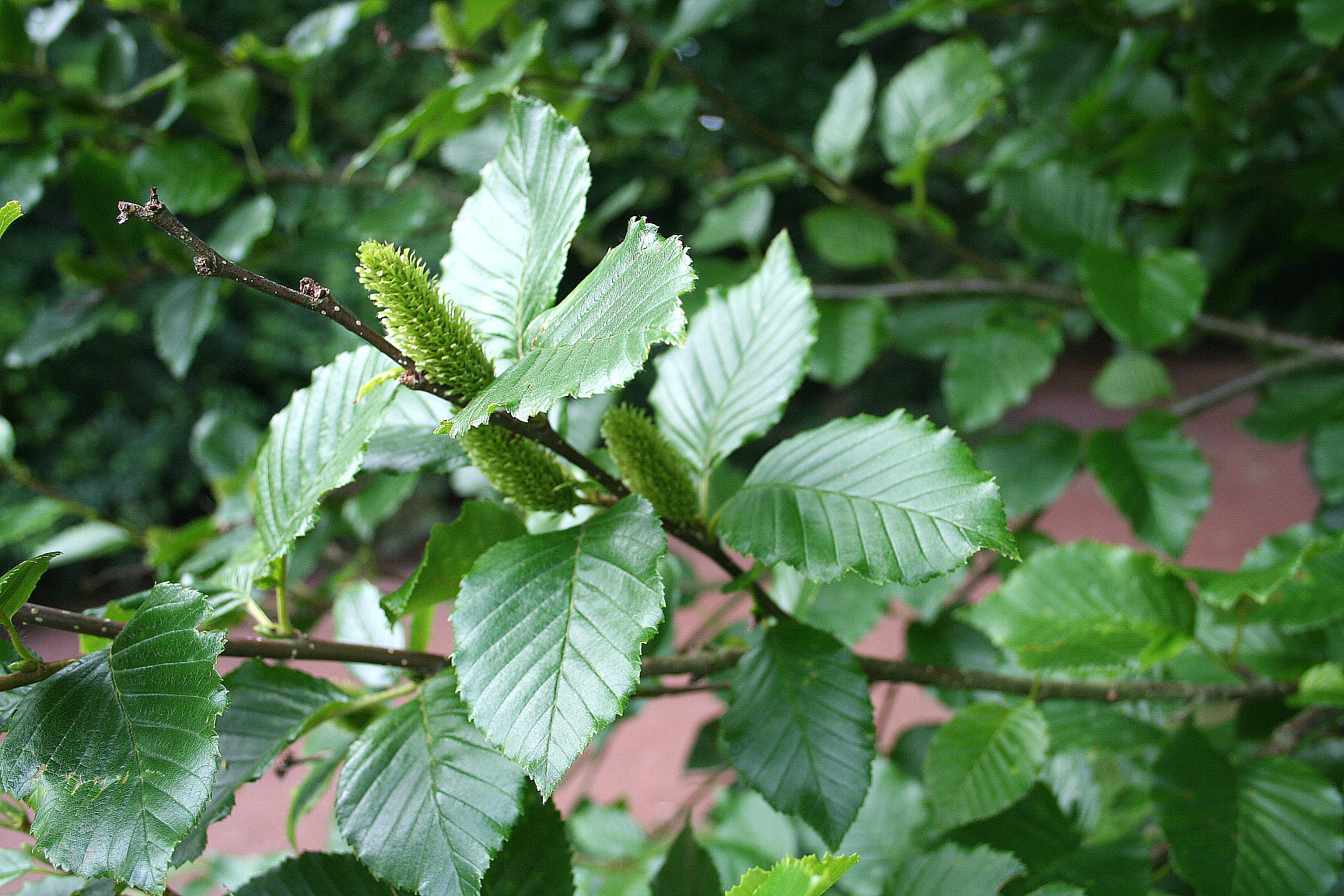
Catkins, leaves and twigs
