= Bedgebury National Pinetum =

Arboretum in Kent, England

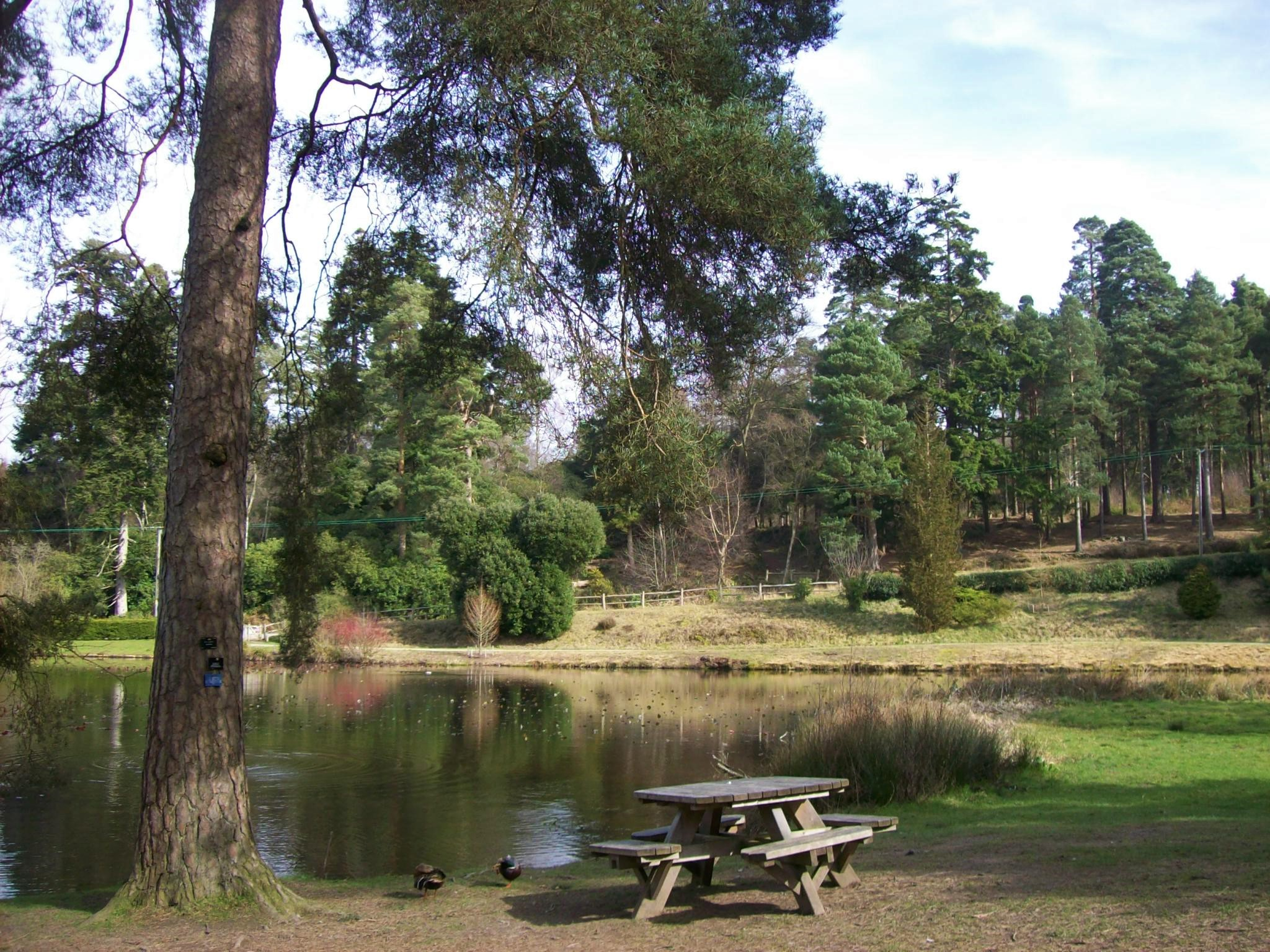
- Bedgebury National Pinetum, Kent

- Location within Kent
- Type: Conifer woodland, arboretum
- Location: Bedgebury, Kent, UK
- Coordinates: 51°04′30″N 0°27′18″E
- Area: 350 acres (140 ha)
- Created: 1924
- Operator: Forestry England
- Open: All year

Bedgebury National Pinetum at Bedgebury, Kent, in the United Kingdom, is a recreational and conservational arboretum managed by Forestry England that was established as the National Conifer Collection in 1925 and is now recognised as the most complete collection of conifers on one site anywhere in the world. The collection has over 10,000 trees growing across 320 acres (1.3 km^{2}), including rare, endangered and historically important specimens. Bedgebury National Pinetum conducts conservation work, is home to some 56 vulnerable or critically endangered species, and houses five National Plant Collections.

== History ==
=== Private estate ===
Bedgebury is first mentioned in an Anglo-Saxon charter in AD 841, the name deriving from the Old English bycgan, meaning "buy", and the Kentish vecge, meaning "to bend or turn", possibly in reference to a stream.

John de Bedgebury is listed as the earliest resident of Bedgebury, in the time of Edward II. In the 15th century Agnes de Bedgebury, sister and heir of John (died 1424) married John Colepeper, whose Colepeper heirs, financed by mining clay-ironstone on the estate, were resident until at the time of the restoration of Charles II, and who created an ornamental park on the Bedgebury estate. Elizabeth I visited in August 1573.

The current house was built in 1688 for Sir James Hayes, a little apart from the old house. The estate later passed to the Stephenson family, who retained it until it was left to a Miss Peach, who sold it in 1789 to John Cartier, Governor of Bengal and High Sheriff of Kent, who improved the plantings and the house.

In the 1840s Viscount William Beresford developed the estate by creating the village of Kilndown and three lodges, one of which – Keepers Lodge, now known as Park House – became the centre of the Pinetum. Beresford initiated the pinetum in the 1850s and his successor, his stepson Alexander Beresford Hope, developed Lady Mildred's Drive to enable visitors in carriages to view the trees.

The estate was sold in 1899 to Isaac Lewis, a London financier. Subsequently in 1918 the woodlands were purchased by the Crown Estate and in 1919 the house was the Church Education Corporation to operate as a school. (The school closed in 2006).

=== National Pinetum ===
The Royal Botanic Gardens at Kew and the Forestry Commission established the site as The National Pinetum in a joint venture in 1924, as the National Conifer Collection, because air pollution was rendering London unsuitable for growing conifers. A site at the southern end of Bedgebury Park was chosen, centred on Marshall's Lake and a stream-filled valley.

The first plants for the pinetum were raised at Kew Gardens in 1921 and transferred to Bedgebury in 1925 and 1926, alongside Viscount Beresford's existing plantings. Development of the collection was managed by the Kew botanist William Dallimore, a world-renowned expert on conifers.

In 1969 management of the pinetum reverted solely to the Forestry Commission, now Forestry England, who extended it in 1977 and created two new lakes. In the Great Storm of 1987 almost a quarter of the trees were brought down. The pinetum has been progressively expanded from the original 50 acress (20 hectares) in 1924 to 350 acres (142 hectares) in 2025.

Following a investment of £2.6m into a new visitor centre, walking and cycling trails and children's play areas, the expanded facility was opened in May 2006 by the Duchess of Edinburgh (then Countess of Wessex).

As of 2025, the pinetum has around 500,000 annual visitors and grows 2,000 trees and shrubs each year to be planted on the estate or sent to other botanical gardens.

== The collection ==
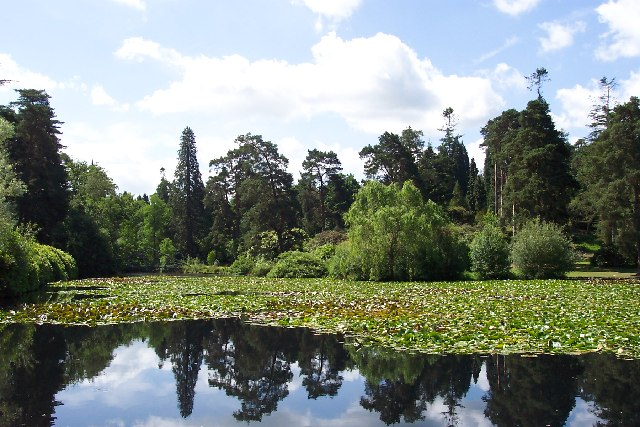
Marshall's Lake

The aim of Bedgebury National Pinetum is "to grow as many species of conifers as the climatic conditions will allow, planted in generic groupings, using geographically associated plantings where possible." (W. Dallimore, 1923)

The pinetum holds 10,000 specimens of conifers and other species that grow in temperate zones, including 7,000 trees, as living gene banks and as a genetic resource for future restoration programmes. It holds 2,300 different species of conifer, specimens of which include the tallest tree in Kent (Abies grandis) and the three tallest Leyland Cypresses in the UK. The plan is for the pinetum to provide a mix of 70% conifers to 30% broadleaves, and to leave 40% of the site open to provide vistas and allow the trees to be appreciated.

Bedgebury National Pinetum is home to six National Plant Collections accredited with the Plant Heritage charity: Yew, Juniper, Thuja, Lawson's Cypress, Leyland Cypress and Cryptomeria japonica.

The collection contains 56 species that have been officially declared vulnerable or critically endangered.

== Conservation ==
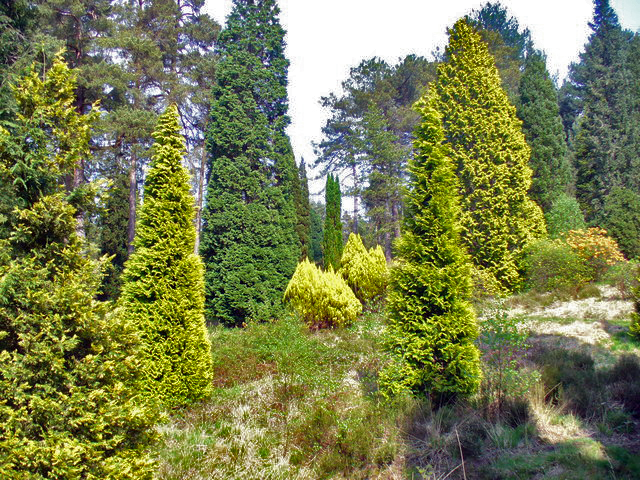
Conifers at Bedgebury National Pinetum

The scale and quality of Bedgebury National Pinetum's conifer collection have made it an ideal site to take part in the International Conifer Conservation Programme (ICCP), run by the Royal Botanic Garden Edinburgh. The ICCP aims to promote the conservation of conifers through conservation work, research and education, and work carried out at Bedgebury makes up part of the effort to conserve the genetic diversity of conifers, particularly those from temperate forests.

The Bedgebury Conifer Conservation Project, initiated in 2007, is designed to use redundant forest plots to grow large numbers – up to 500 – of endangered conifers to provide an ex-situ genetic resource. The first plots were planted with Chilean plum yew by Boy Scouts celebrating their centenary in 2007, and future plantings will include samples from Europe, Asia, North America and Australasia.

Bedgebury nursery was the first to germinate Vietnamese golden cypress (Xanthocyparis vietnamensis) and chichibu birch (Betula chichibuensis) seeds in cultivation.
