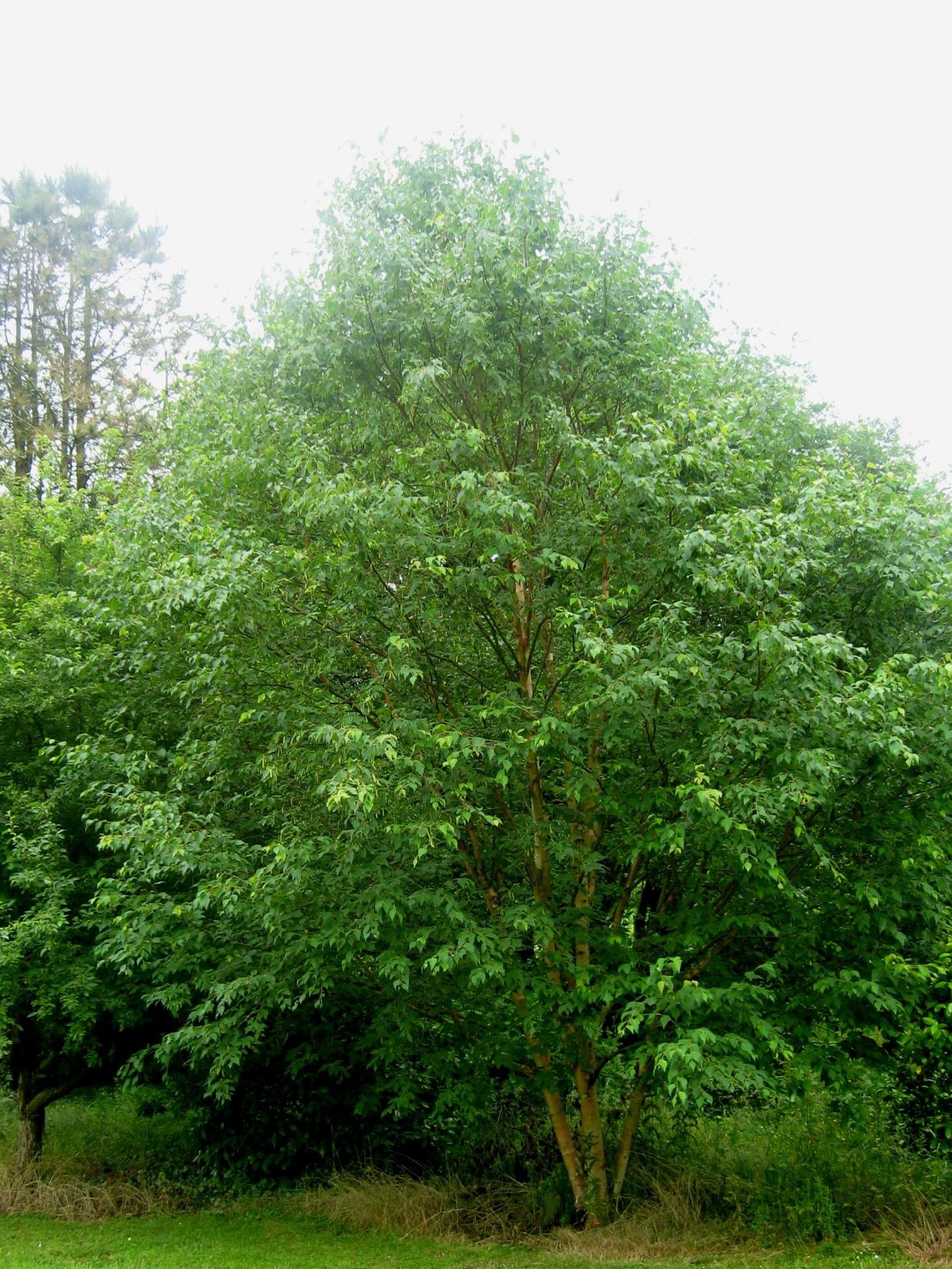
- Betula grossa, Sir Harold Hillier Gardens, England

Conservation status
- Least Concern (IUCN 3.1)

Scientific classification
- Kingdom: Plantae
- Clade: Embryophytes
- Clade: Tracheophytes
- Clade: Angiosperms
- Clade: Eudicots
- Clade: Rosids
- Order: Fagales
- Family: Betulaceae
- Genus: Betula
- Subgenus: Betula subg. Betulenta
- Species: B. grossa

Binomial name
- Betula grossa Siebold & Zucc.

Synonyms
- Betula carpinifolia Ehrh.; Betula solennis Anon.; Betula ulmifolia Anon.

= Betula grossa =

Species of flowering plant

Betula grossa, commonly known as Japanese cherry birch (Japanese: 梓 azusa), is a species of birch native to Japan, where it grows naturally in mixed woodland on hill and mountain slopes in Honshu, Shikoku, and Kyushu. It was introduced to the West in 1896, but remains rare in cultivation.

== Description ==
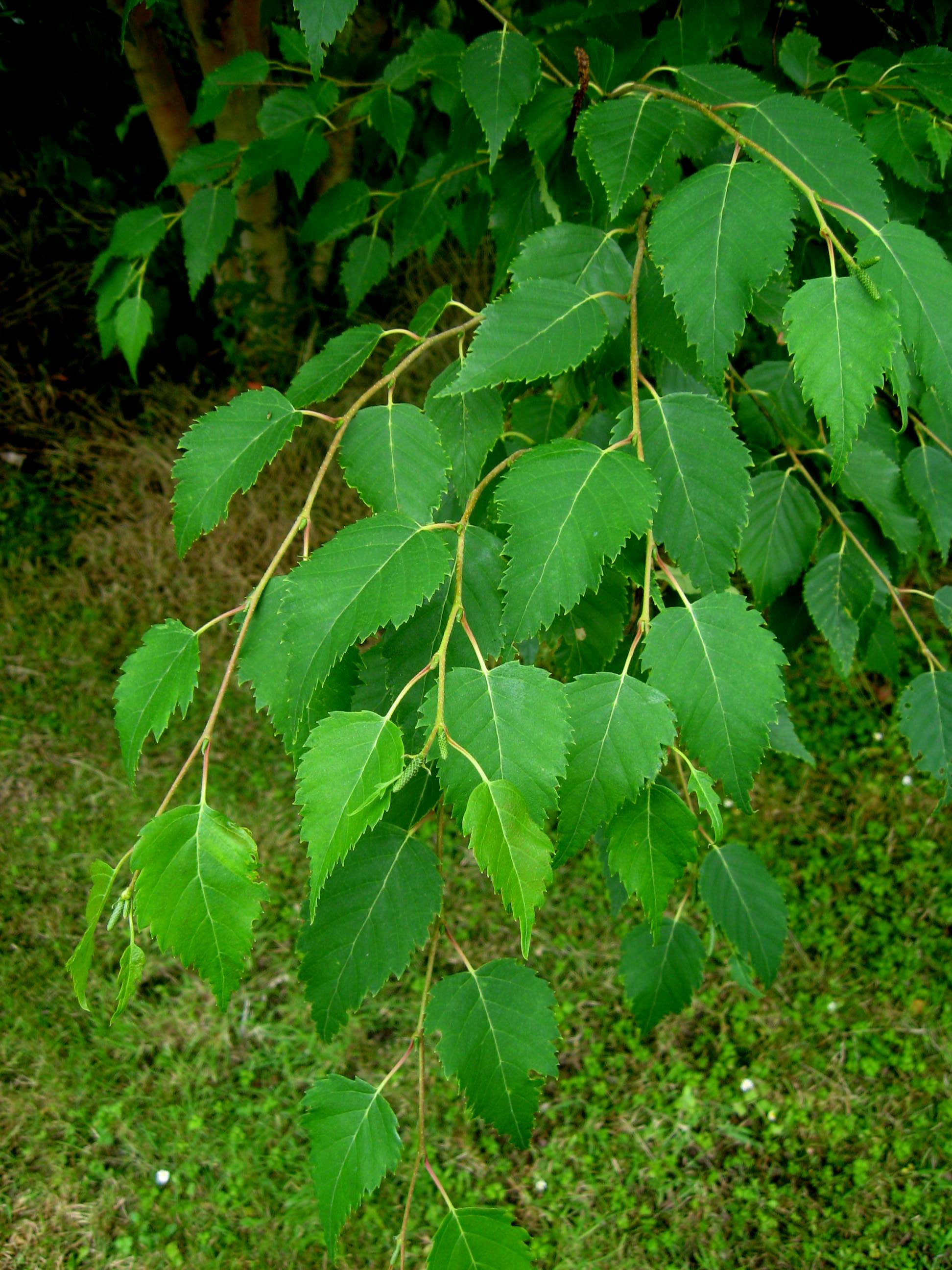
Betula grossa foliage

Betula grossa is conical in outline, but its most distinctive feature is its cherry-like bark, with horizontal stripes of reddish-grey becoming dark grey with age, exfoliating in thin papery curls. The dark green leaves are up to 10 cm long and turn golden-yellow in autumn. The shoots are aromatic, and carry long, yellow-brown, male catkins in early spring. . The species is considered closely related to the American birch Betula lenta. Hardiness: RHS H4.
