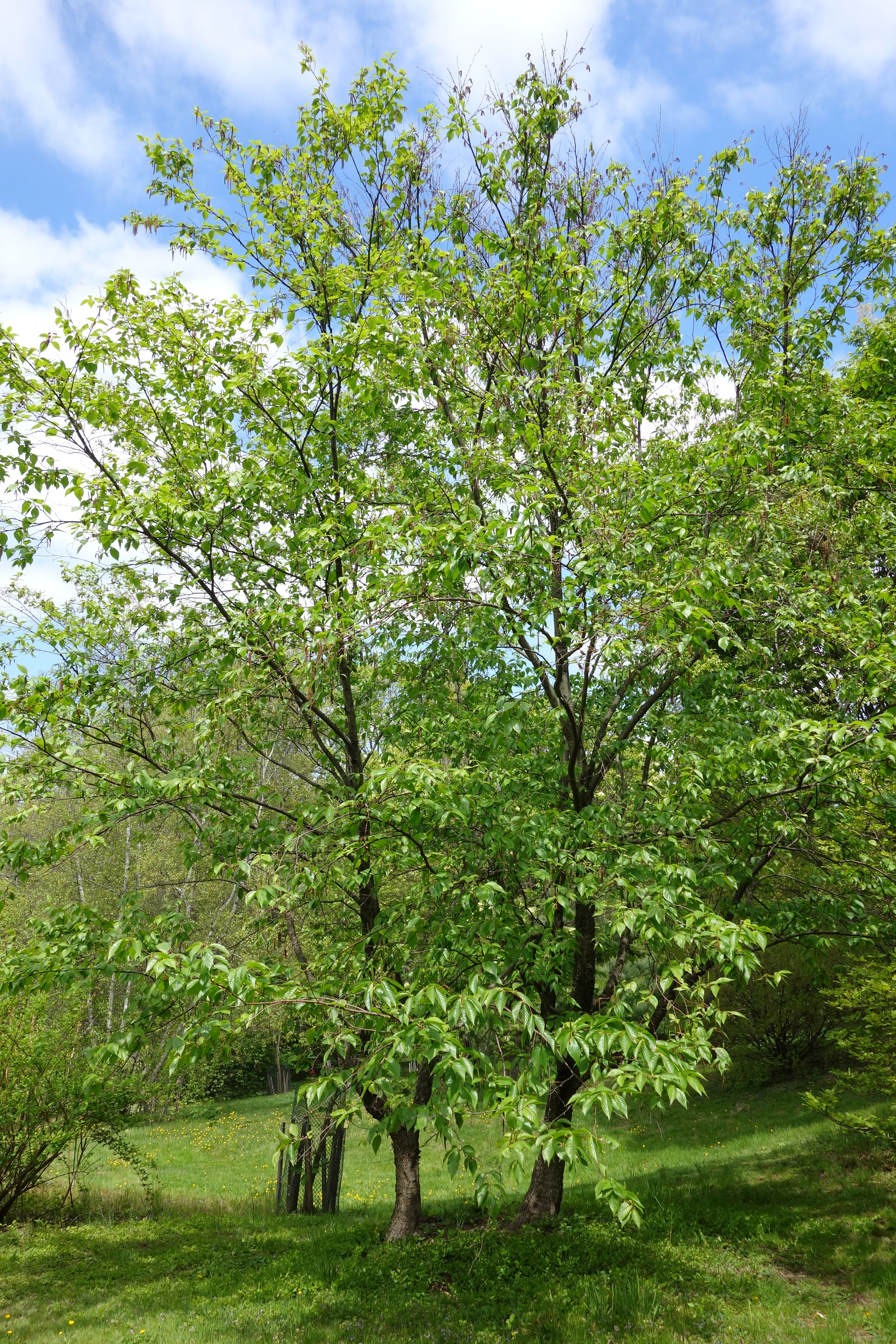
- At the Morris Arboretum
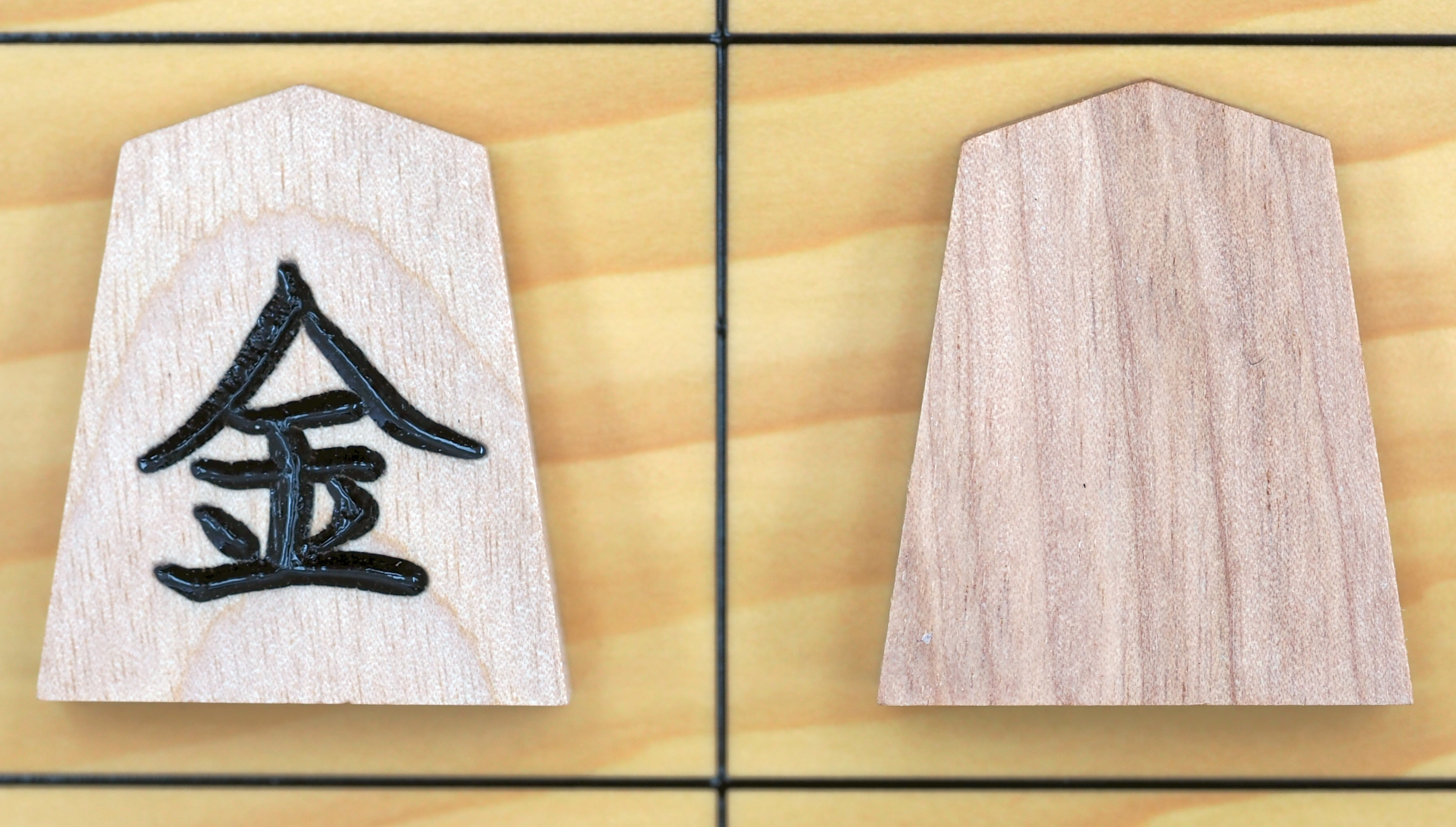
- Shogi pieces made of ono-ore (ax-breaker) wood

Conservation status
- Least Concern (IUCN 3.1)

Scientific classification
- Kingdom: Plantae
- Clade: Embryophytes
- Clade: Tracheophytes
- Clade: Angiosperms
- Clade: Eudicots
- Clade: Rosids
- Order: Fagales
- Family: Betulaceae
- Genus: Betula
- Species: B. schmidtii

Binomial name
- Betula schmidtii Regel

Synonyms
- Betula schmidtii f. angustifolia (Makino & Nemoto) Sugim. ex H.Ohba; Betula schmidtii var. angustifolia Makino & Nemoto; Betula schmidtii var. lancea Nakai; Betula schmidtii f. lancea (Nakai) M.Kim

= Betula schmidtii =

Species of flowering plant

Betula schmidtii, the iron birch or Schmidt's birch, is a species of flowering plant in the family Betulaceae. It is native to Manchuria, Korea, Primorsky Krai of the Russian Far East, and Japan. A tree reaching 30 m (100 ft) with nearly black bark, its wood is so dense that it does not float, and is used where a tough, durable material is desired.
