= Bedgebury Forest =

Forest in Kent, England

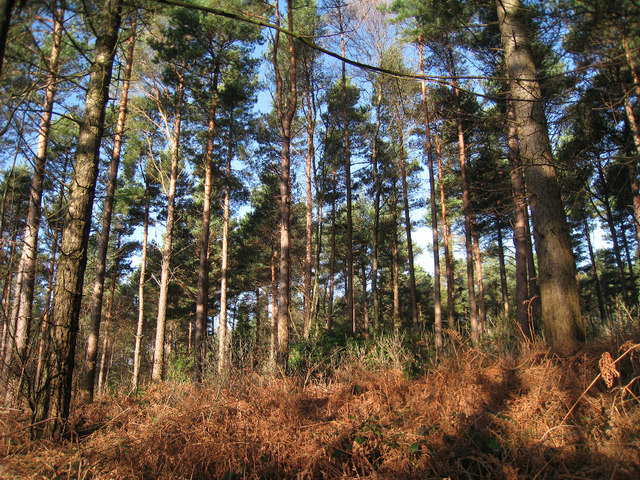
- Bedgebury Forest, Kent

- Location within Kent
- Interactive map of Bedgebury Forest
- Type: Forest
- Location: Kent, UK
- OS grid: TQ7257432820
- Coordinates: 51°04′06″N 0°27′48″E
- Area: 10.5 square kilometres (2,600 acres)
- Operator: Forestry England

Bedgebury Forest is a 10.5 square kilometres (2,600 acres) forest surrounding Bedgebury National Pinetum, near Flimwell in Kent. In contrast to the National Pinetum, which contains exclusively coniferous trees, the forest contains both deciduous and coniferous species. It forms part of the High Weald Area of Outstanding Natural Beauty, and is one of the so-called "Seven Wonders Of The Weald". Bedgebury Forest has facilities for cycling, mountain biking, riding, orienteering and adventure play.

== History ==
Bedgebury is first mentioned in an Anglo-Saxon charter in AD 841, the name deriving from the Old English bycgan, meaning "buy", and the Kentish vecge, meaning "to bend or turn", possibly about a stream.

Bedgebury Forest has always been wooded and is classed as an ancient woodland. Heather is present, which indicates that parts of the forest may have been managed as wooded heath. Streams in the Forest show evidence of dams, storing water for the Wealden iron industry and later the ornamental lakes on the Bedgebury Estate.

== Geography ==
Bedgebury Forest is located between Goudhurst, Hawkhurst and Flimwell in the High Weald of Kent. It is situated on a high plateau, amongst the rolling hills of the Wealden Group. The geology is mostly clay and sandstone, and the soil is poor and acidic, which is the reason for the woodland's persistence: better, more accessible land was cleared for agriculture long ago. Bedgebury Forest falls within the catchment areas of the rivers Medway and Rother.

== Activities ==
Bedgebury Forest is open to the public and provides facilities for cycling, mountain biking, riding, orienteering, and adventure play. The network of paths and tracks that run through the forest provide opportunities for walking and running.

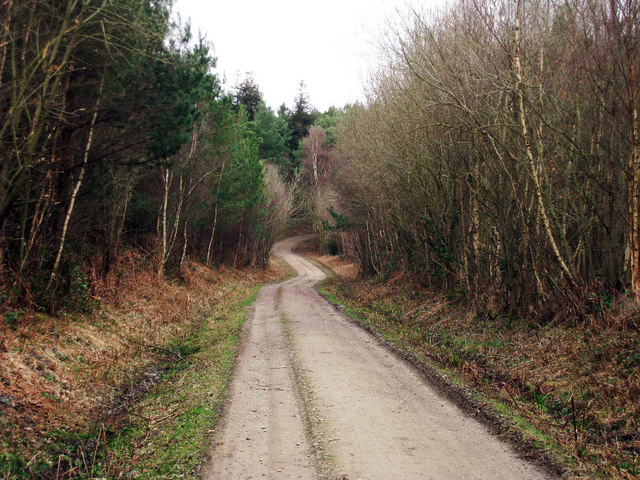
One of the tracks that run through the forest.

=== Cycling ===
There are 13 kilometres (8.1 mi) of surfaced cycle track and 13 kilometres (8.1 mi) of single-track mountain-bike routes, and a "free-ride" area has been set up that allows riders to perform jumps and stunts. The Visitor Centre provides cycles for hire. In 2006 Bedgebury Forest Cycling Club was set up.

=== Running and orienteering ===
Bedgebury Forest has four orienteering routes of varying difficulty levels, designed by a British Orienteering Federation-affiliated group. The shortest is 1.6 kilometres (0.99 mi), and the longest is 2.7 kilometres (1.7 mi), with maps provided by the Visitor Centre. Bedgebury Forest also hosts an annual 10 km charity run.

=== Horse Riding ===
There are dedicated way-marked horse-riding trails across the forest that link to existing bridlepaths, creating a network of horse-friendly routes. Riders must have a TROT permit.

=== Adventure play ===
Bedgebury Forest has a specially designed adventure play area incorporating trails, swings, climbing walls, and other child play facilities. A Go Ape adventure course was installed in spring 2007.

== See also ==
- Bedgebury National Pinetum
