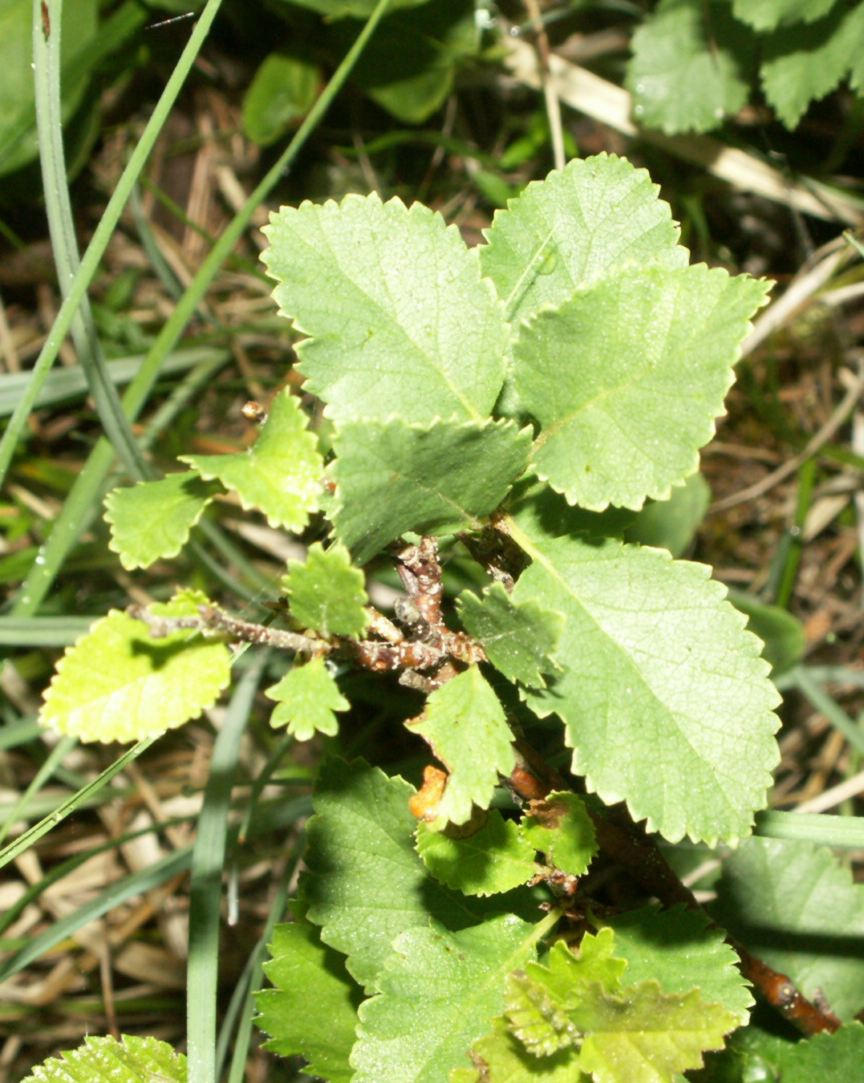

Conservation status
- Least Concern (IUCN 3.1)

Scientific classification
- Kingdom: Plantae
- Clade: Embryophytes
- Clade: Tracheophytes
- Clade: Angiosperms
- Clade: Eudicots
- Clade: Rosids
- Order: Fagales
- Family: Betulaceae
- Genus: Betula
- Subgenus: Betula subg. Chamaebetula
- Species: B. humilis

Binomial name
- Betula humilis Schrank

Synonyms
- Synonymy: Betula humilis var. genuina Regel, not validly publ.; Betula humilis var. vulgaris Perfil., not validly publ.; Betula extremiorientalis Kuzen. & V.N.Vassil.; Betula fruticans Pall.; Betula fruticosa subsp. extremiorientalis (Kuzen. & V.N.Vassil.) Vorosch.; Betula humilis f. calcarata Perfil.; Betula humilis var. camtschatica Regel; Betula humilis var. commutata Regel; Betula humilis f. crispa Perfil.; Betula humilis var. cuneata Perfil.; Betula humilis f. elliptica Perfil., nom. illeg. homonym. post.; Betula humilis f. elliptica Perfil., nom. illeg. homonym. post.; Betula humilis f. elliptica Perfil., nom. illeg. homonym. post.; Betula humilis f. obovata Perfil.; Betula humilis f. ovata Perfil. in Bot. Zhurn. S.S.S.R. 20: 643 (1935), nom. illeg. homonym. post.; Betula humilis f. ovata Perfil. in Bot. Zhurn. S.S.S.R. 20: 641 (1935), nom. illeg. homonym. post.; Betula humilis var. oycowiensis Nyman; Betula humilis var. socolowii Regel; Betula humilis var. subcordata Perfil.; Betula kamtschatica H.Buek; Betula myrsinoides Tausch; Betula oycowiensis Rchb., nom. illeg. homonym. post.; Betula palustris Rupr., nom. illeg. homonym. post.; Betula sibirica Lodd. ex Regel; Betula socolowii J.Jacq. ex Regel, pro syn.; Chamaebetula humilis (Schrank) Opiz

= Betula humilis =

Species of flowering plant

Betula humilis, known in English as the shrubby birch, is a species of birch native to central and Eastern Europe, Siberia, Kazakhstan, Xinjiang, and Mongolia. The species has ovate leaves that are 1.2–3.5 centimetres (0.47–1.38 in) long and is related to Betula fruticosa.
