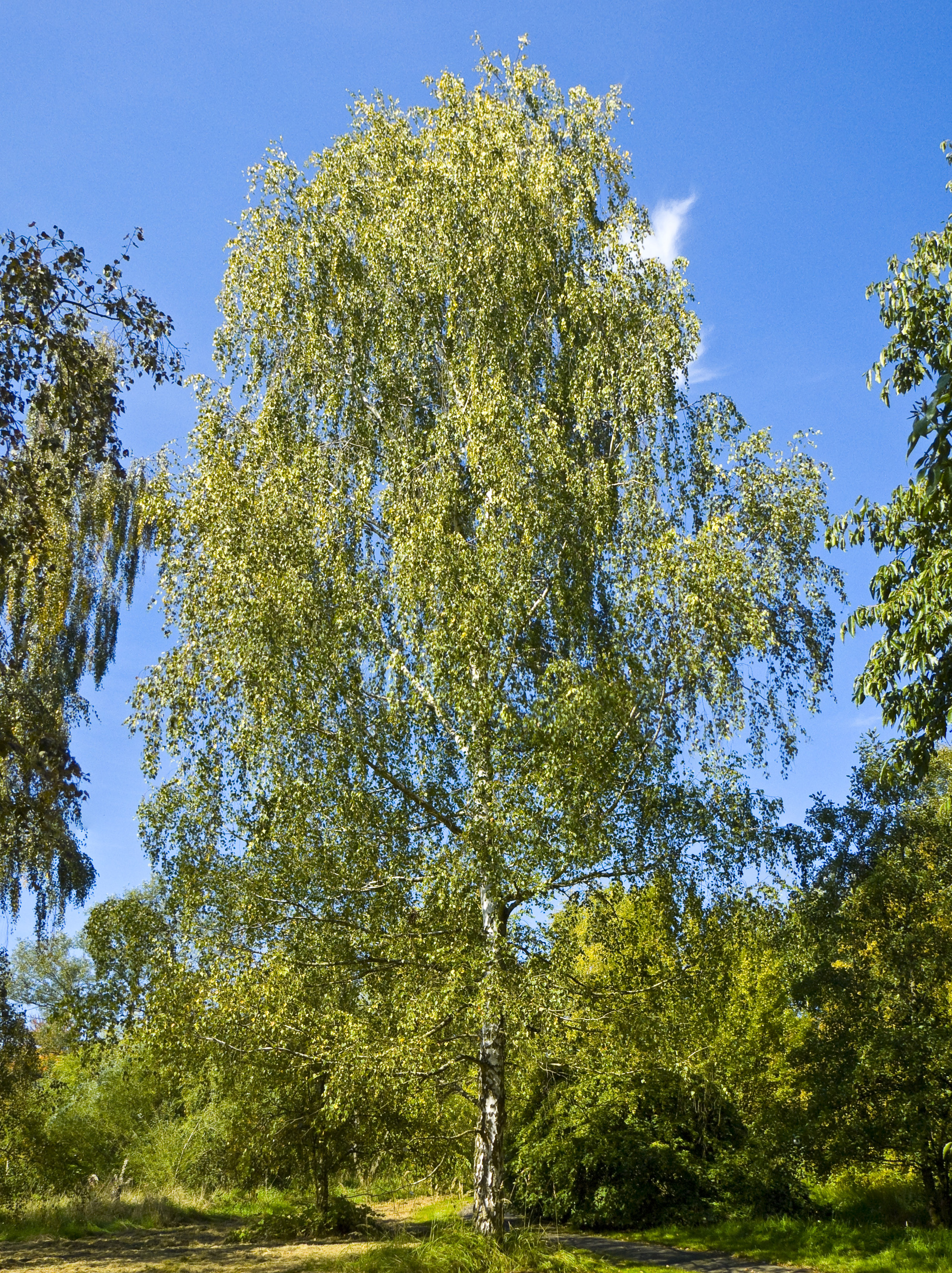
- Betula pendula (Silver birch)

Scientific classification
- Kingdom: Plantae
- Clade: Tracheophytes
- Clade: Angiosperms
- Clade: Eudicots
- Clade: Rosids
- Order: Fagales
- Family: Betulaceae
- Subfamily: Betuloideae
- Genus: Betula; L.

Subgenera
- Betulenta; Betulaster; Neurobetula; Betula; Chamaebetula
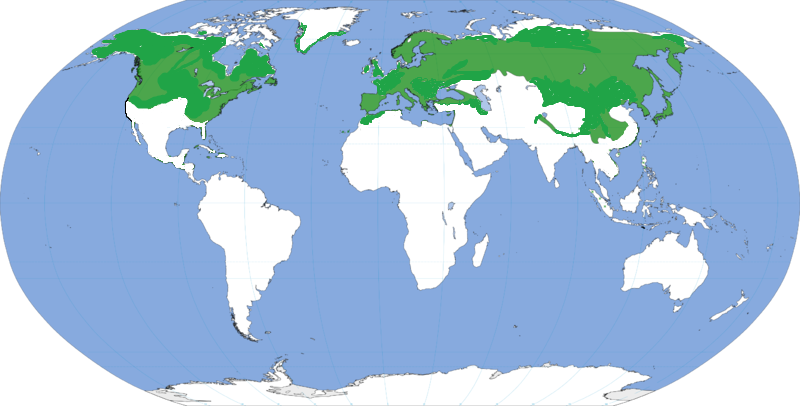
- Range of Betula

Synonyms
- Betulaster Spach; Apterocaryon Opiz; Chamaebetula Opiz

= Birch =

Birch Temporal range: Ypresian–Recent

Genus of trees

A birch is a thin-leaved deciduous hardwood tree of the genus Betula (/ˈbɛtjʊlə/), in the family Betulaceae, which also includes alders, hazels, and hornbeams. It is closely related to the beech-oak family Fagaceae. The genus Betula contains 30 to 60 known taxa of which 11 are on the IUCN 2011 Red List of Threatened Species. They are typically short-lived pioneer species and are widespread in the Northern Hemisphere, particularly in northern areas of temperate climates and in boreal climates. Birch wood is used for a wide range of purposes.

== Description ==
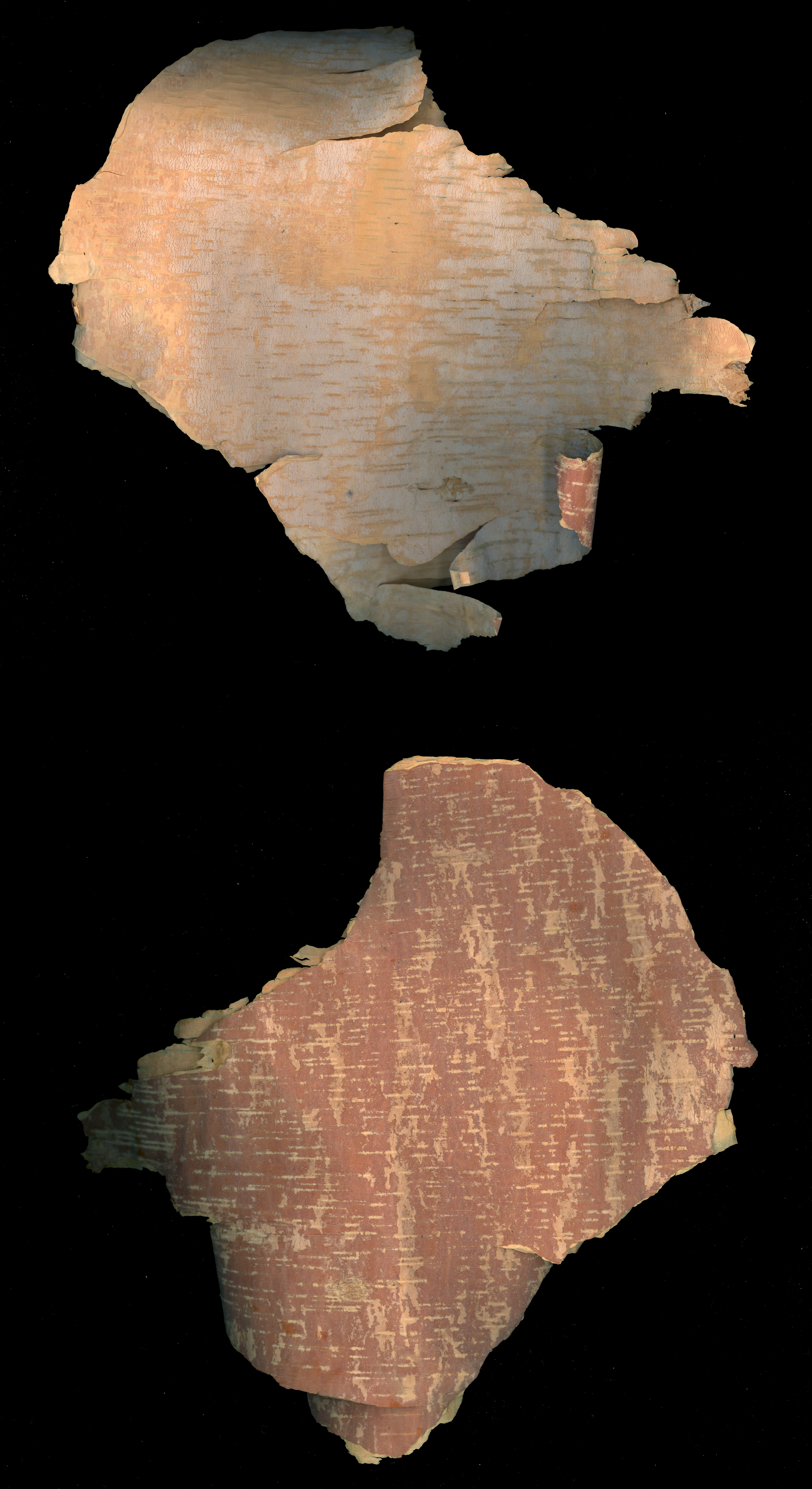
The front and rear view of a piece of birch bark

Birch species are generally small to medium-sized trees or shrubs, mostly of northern temperate and boreal climates. The simple leaves are alternate, singly or doubly serrate, feather-veined, petiolate and stipulate. They often appear in pairs, but these pairs are really borne on spur-like, two-leaved, lateral branchlets. The fruit is a small samara, although the wings may be obscure in some species. They differ from the alders (Alnus, another genus in the family) in that the female catkins are not woody and disintegrate at maturity, falling apart to release the seeds, unlike the woody, cone-like female alder catkins.

The bark of all birches is characteristically marked with long, horizontal lenticels, and often separates into thin, papery plates, especially upon the paper birch. Distinctive colors give the common names gray, white, black, silver and yellow birch to different species.

The buds, forming early and full-grown by midsummer, are all lateral, without a terminal bud forming; the branch is prolonged by the upper lateral bud. The wood of all the species is close-grained with a satiny texture and capable of taking a fine polish; its fuel value is fair.

=== Flower and fruit ===
The flowers are monoecious, and open with or before the leaves. Once fully grown, these leaves are usually 3–6 millimetres (1/8–1/4 in) long on three-flowered clusters in the axils of the scales of drooping or erect catkins or aments. Staminate catkins are pendulous, clustered, or solitary in the axils of the last leaves of the branch of the year or near the ends of the short lateral branchlets of the year. They form in early autumn and remain rigid during the winter. The scales of the mature staminate catkins are broadly ovate, rounded, yellow or orange colour below the middle and dark chestnut brown at apex. Each scale bears two bractlets and three sterile flowers, each flower consisting of a sessile, membranous, usually two-lobed, calyx. Each calyx bears four short filaments with one-celled anthers or strictly, two filaments divided into two branches, each bearing a half-anther. Anther cells open longitudinally. The pistillate segments are erect or pendulous, and solitary, terminal on the two-leaved lateral spur-like branchlets of the year. The pistillate scales are oblong-ovate, three-lobed, pale yellow-green often tinged with red, becoming brown at maturity. These scales bear two or three fertile flowers, each flower consisting of a naked ovary. The ovary is compressed, two-celled, and crowned with two slender styles; the ovule is solitary. Each scale bears a single small, winged nut that is oval, with two persistent stigmas at the apex.

== Taxonomy ==
=== Subdivision ===
Betula species are organised into five subgenera.

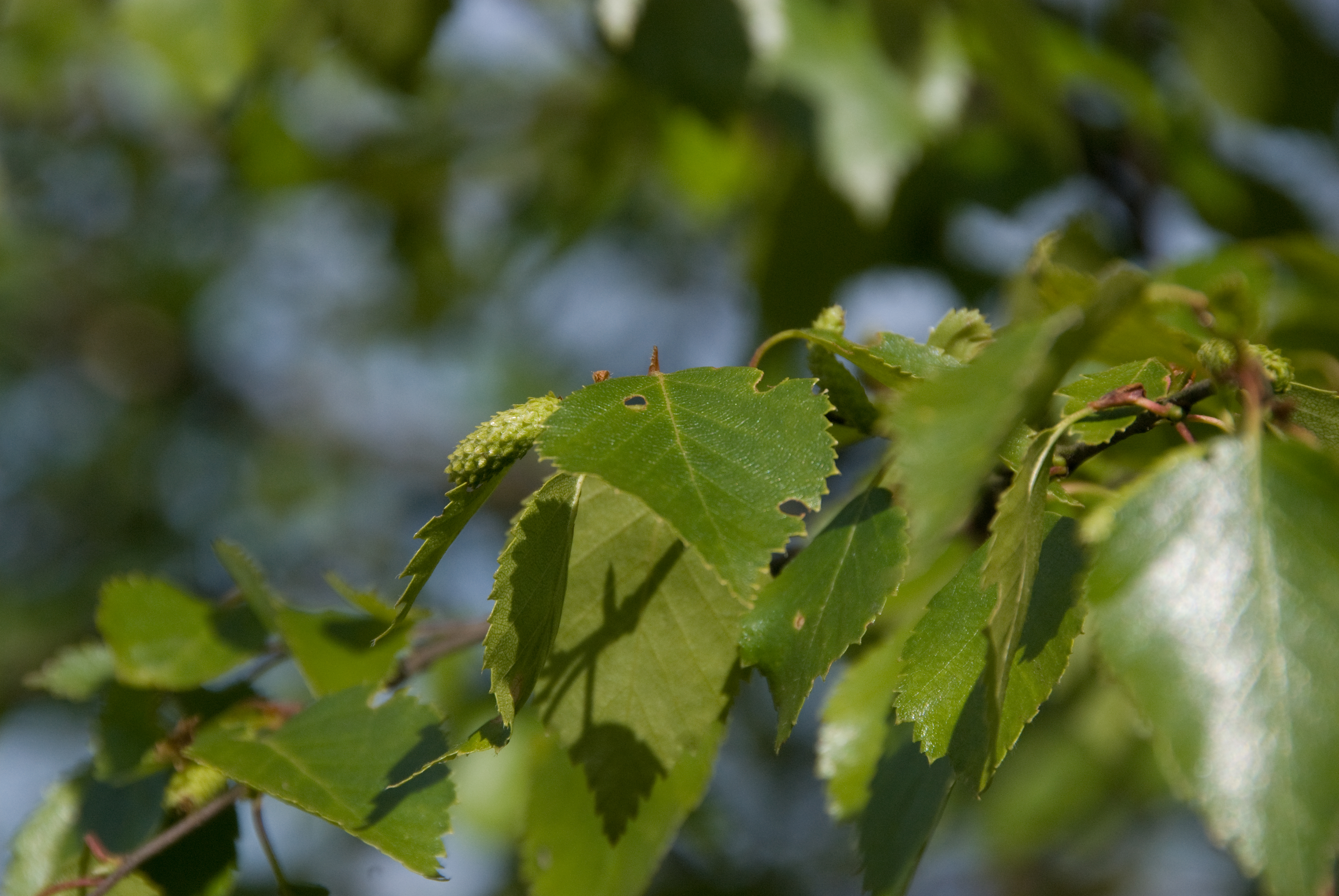
Birch leaves

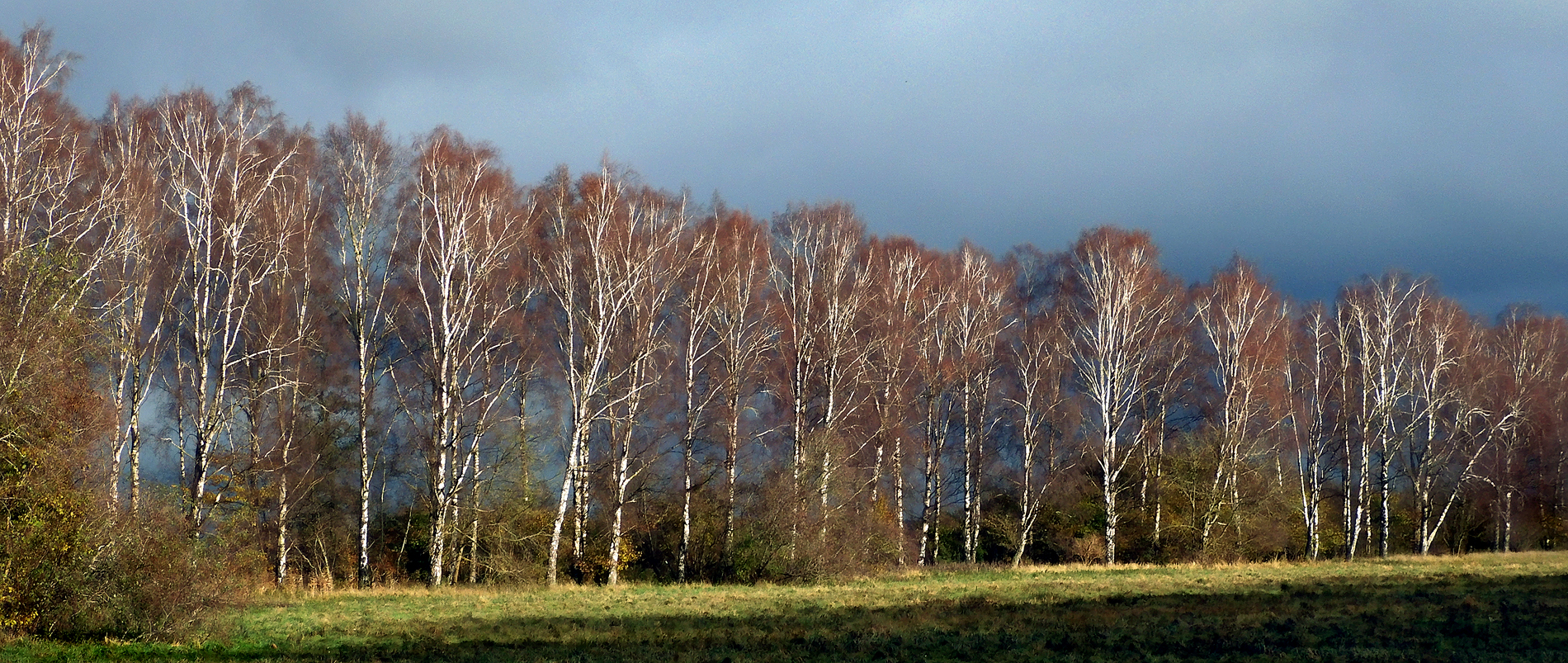
A birch-curtain in November in Ystad

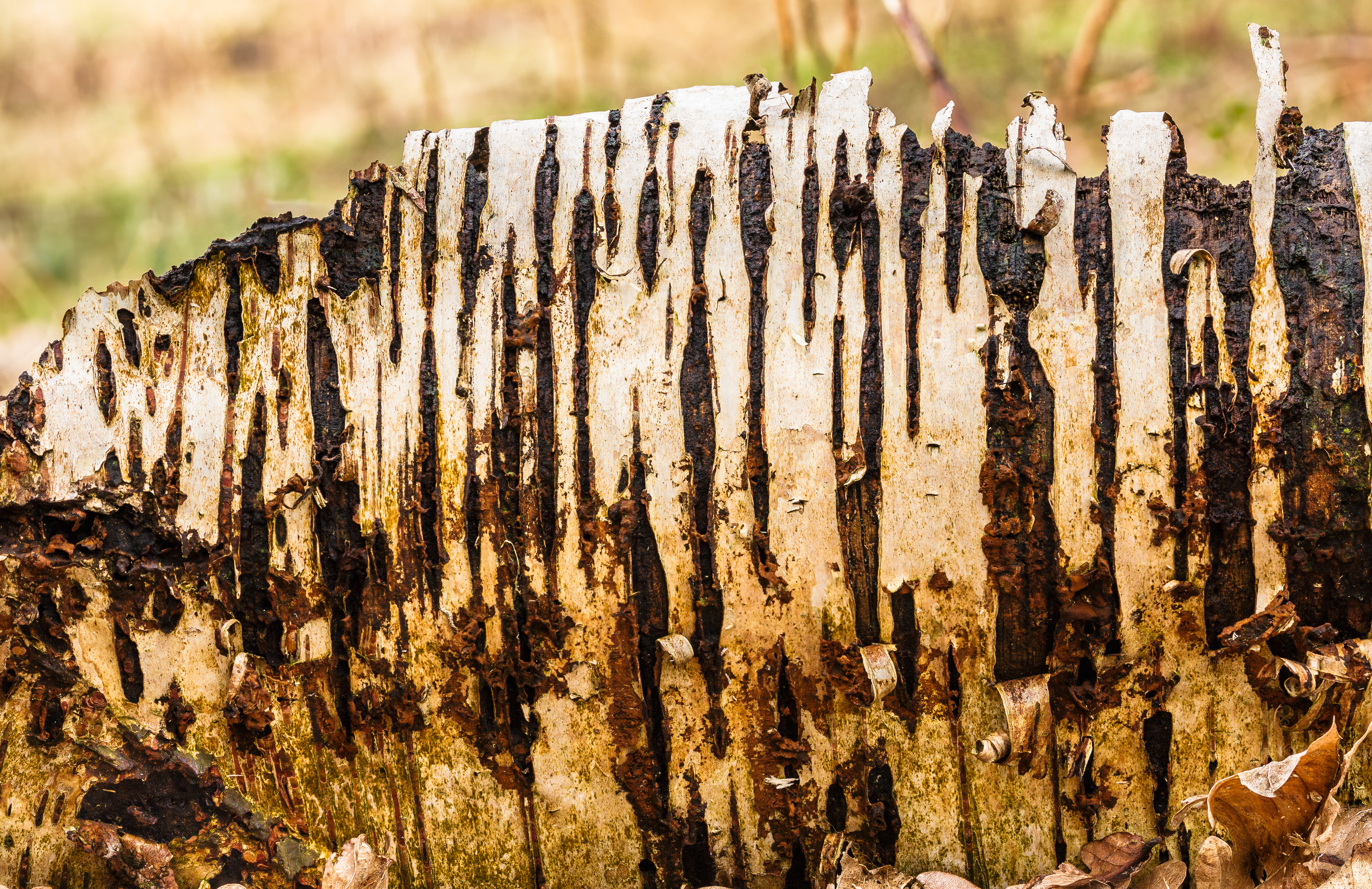
Lying trunk of a birch (Betula) in total decomposition

Birches native to Eurasia include

- Betula albosinensis – Chinese red birch (northern + central China)
- Betula alnoides – alder-leaf birch (China, Himalayas, northern Indochina)
- Betula ashburneri – (Bhutan, Tibet, Sichuan, Yunnan Provinces in China)
- Betula baschkirica – (eastern European Russia)
- Betula bomiensis – (Tibet)
- Betula browicziana – (Turkey and Georgia)
- Betula buggsii – (China)
- Betula calcicola – (Sichuan + Yunnan Provinces in China)
- Betula celtiberica – (Spain and Portugal)
- Betula chichibuensis – (Chichibu region of Japan)
- Betula chinensis – Chinese dwarf birch (China, Korea)
- Betula coriaceifolia – (Uzbekistan)
- Betula corylifolia – (Honshu Island in Japan)
- Betula costata – (northeastern China, Korea, Primorye region of Russia)
- Betula cylindrostachya – (Himalayas, southern China, Myanmar)
- Betula dahurica – (eastern Siberia, Russian Far East, northeastern China, Mongolia, Korea, Japan)
- Betula delavayi – (Tibet, southern China)
- Betula ermanii – Erman's birch (eastern Siberia, Russian Far East, northeastern China, Korea, Japan)
- Betula falcata – (Tajikistan)
- Betula fargesii – (Chongqing + Hubei Provinces in China)
- Betula fruticosa – (eastern Siberia, Russian Far East, northeastern China, Mongolia, Korea, Japan)
- Betula globispica – (Honshu Island in Japan)
- Betula gmelinii – (Siberia, Mongolia, northeastern China, Korea, Hokkaido Island in Japan)
- Betula grossa – Japanese cherry birch (Japan)
- Betula gynoterminalis – (Yunnan Province in China)
- Betula honanensis – (Henan Province in China)
- Betula humilis or Betula kamtschatica – Kamchatka birch platyphylla (northern + central Europe, Siberia, Kazakhstan, Xinjiang, Mongolia, Korea)
- Betula insignis – (southern China)
- Betula karagandensis – (Kazakhstan)
- Betula klokovii – (Ukraine)
- Betula kotulae – (Ukraine)
- Betula luminifera – (China)
- Betula maximowicziana – monarch birch (Japan, Kuril Islands)
- Betula medwediewii – Caucasian birch (Turkey, Iran, Caucasus)
- Betula megrelica – (Republic of Georgia)
- Betula microphylla – (Siberia, Mongolia, Xinjiang, Kazakhstan, Kyrgyzstan, Uzbekistan)
- Betula nana – dwarf birch (northern + central Europe, Russia, Siberia, Greenland, Northwest Territories of Canada))
- Betula pendula – silver birch (widespread in Europe and northern Asia; Morocco; naturalized in New Zealand and scattered locations in US + Canada)
- Betula platyphylla – (Betula pendula var. platyphylla) – Siberian silver birch (Siberia, Russian Far East, Manchuria, Korea, Japan, Alaska, western Canada)
- Betula potamophila – (Tajikistan)
- Betula potaninii – (southern China)
- Betula psammophila – (Kazakhstan)
- Betula pubescens – downy birch, also known as white, European white or hairy birch (Europe, Siberia, Greenland, Newfoundland; naturalized in scattered locations in US)
- Betula raddeana – (Caucasus)
- Betula saksarensis – (Khakassiya region of Siberia)
- Betula saviczii – (Kazakhstan)
- Betula schmidtii – (northeastern China, Korea, Japan, Primorye region of Russia)
- Betula sunanensis – (Gansu Province of China)
- Betula szechuanica – (Betula pendula var. szechuanica)—Sichuan birch (Tibet, southern China)
- Betula tianshanica – (Kazakhstan, Kyrgyzstan, Tajikistan, Uzbekistan, Xinjiang, Mongolia)
- Betula utilis – Himalayan birch (Afghanistan, Central Asia, China, Tibet, Himalayas)
- Betula wuyiensis – (Fujian Province of China)
- Betula zinserlingii – (Kyrgyzstan)

Note: many American texts have B. pendula and B. pubescens confused, though they are distinct species with different chromosome numbers.

Birches native to North America include

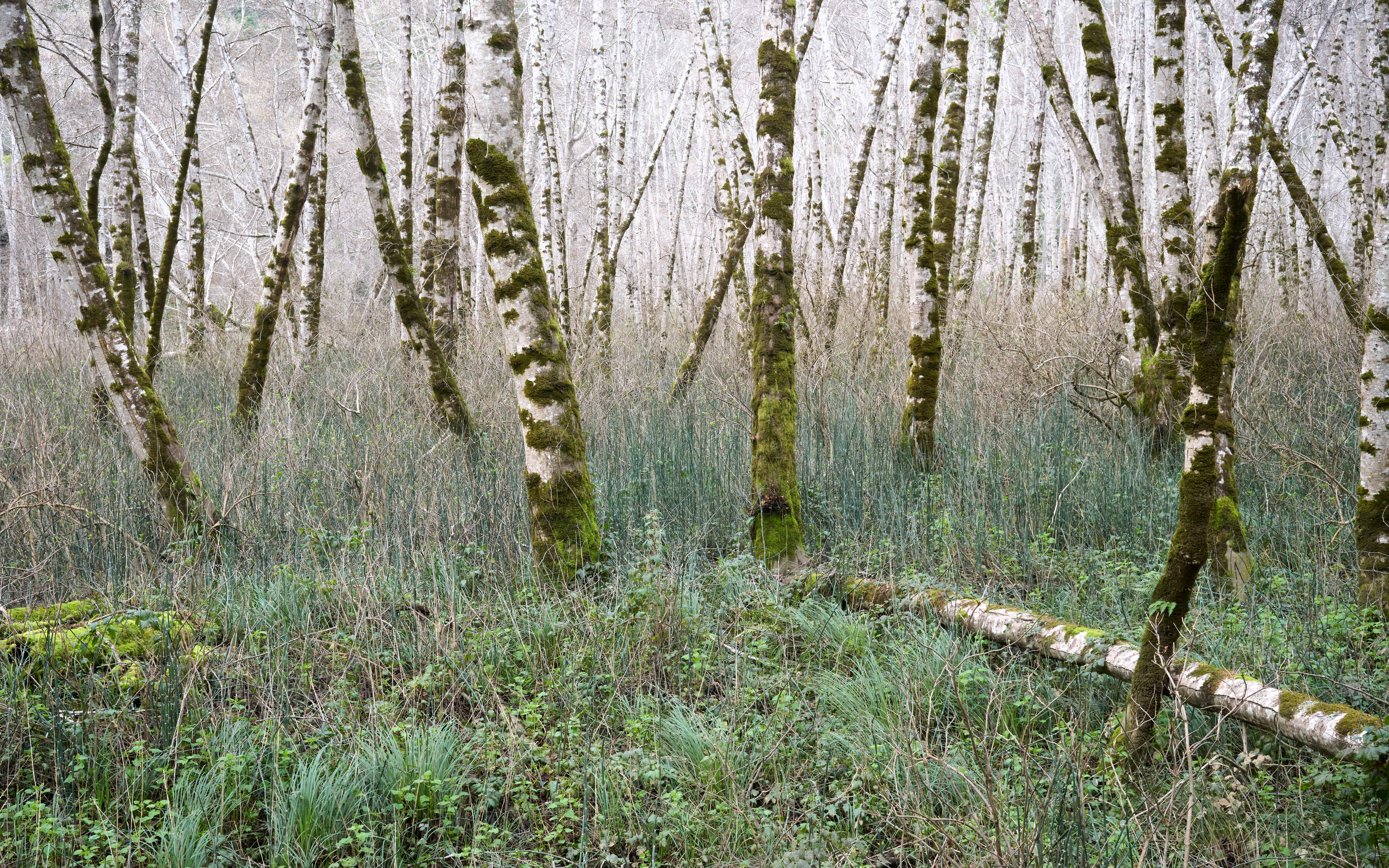
Birch trees in the Ten Mile Estuary State Marine Conservation Area south of Newport, California

- Betula alleghaniensis – yellow birch (B. lutea) (eastern Canada, Great Lakes, upper eastern US, Appalachians)
- Betula caerulea – blue birch (northeast of North America)
- Betula cordifolia – mountain paper birch (eastern Canada, Great Lakes, New England US)
- Betula glandulosa – American dwarf birch (Siberia, Mongolia, Russian Far East, Alaska, Canada, Greenland, mountains of western US and New England, Adirondacks)
- Betula kenaica – Kenai birch ( Alaska, northwestern North America)
- Betula lenta – sweet birch, cherry birch, or black birch (Quebec, Ontario, eastern US)
- Betula michauxii – Newfoundland dwarf birch (Newfoundland, Labrador, Quebec, Nova Scotia)
- Betula minor – dwarf white birch (eastern Canada, mountains of northern New England and Adirondacks)
- Betula murrayana – Murray's birch (Great Lakes endemic)
- Betula nana – dwarf birch or bog birch (also in northern Europe and Asia)
- Betula neoalaskana – Alaska paper birch also known as Alaska birch or Resin birch (Alaska and northern Canada)
- Betula nigra – river birch or black birch (eastern US)
- Betula occidentalis – water birch or red birch (B. fontinalis) (Alaska, Yukon, Northwest Territories, western Canada, western US)
- Betula papyrifera – paper birch, canoe birch or American white birch (Alaska, most of Canada, northern US)
- Betula populifolia – gray birch (eastern Canada, northeastern US)
- Betula pumila – swamp birch (Alaska, Canada, northern US)
- Betula uber – Virginia round-leaf birch (southwestern Virginia)

=== Etymology ===
The common name birch comes from Old English birce, bierce, from Proto-Germanic *berk-jōn (cf. German Birke, West Frisian bjirk), an adjectival formation from *berkōn (cf. Dutch berk, Low German Bark, Danish birk, Norwegian bjørk), itself from the Proto-Indo-European root *bʰerHǵ- ~ bʰrHǵ-, which also gave Lithuanian béržas, Latvian Bērzs, Russian берёза (berëza), Ukrainian береза (beréza), Albanian bredh 'fir', Ossetian bærz(æ), Sanskrit bhurja, Polish brzoza, Czech bříza, Slovak breza. This root is presumably derived from *bʰreh₁ǵ- 'to shine, whiten', in reference to the birch's white bark. The Proto-Germanic rune berkanan is named after the birch.

The generic name Betula is from Latin, which is a diminutive borrowed from Gaulish betua (cf. Old Irish bethe, Welsh bedw).

== Evolutionary history ==
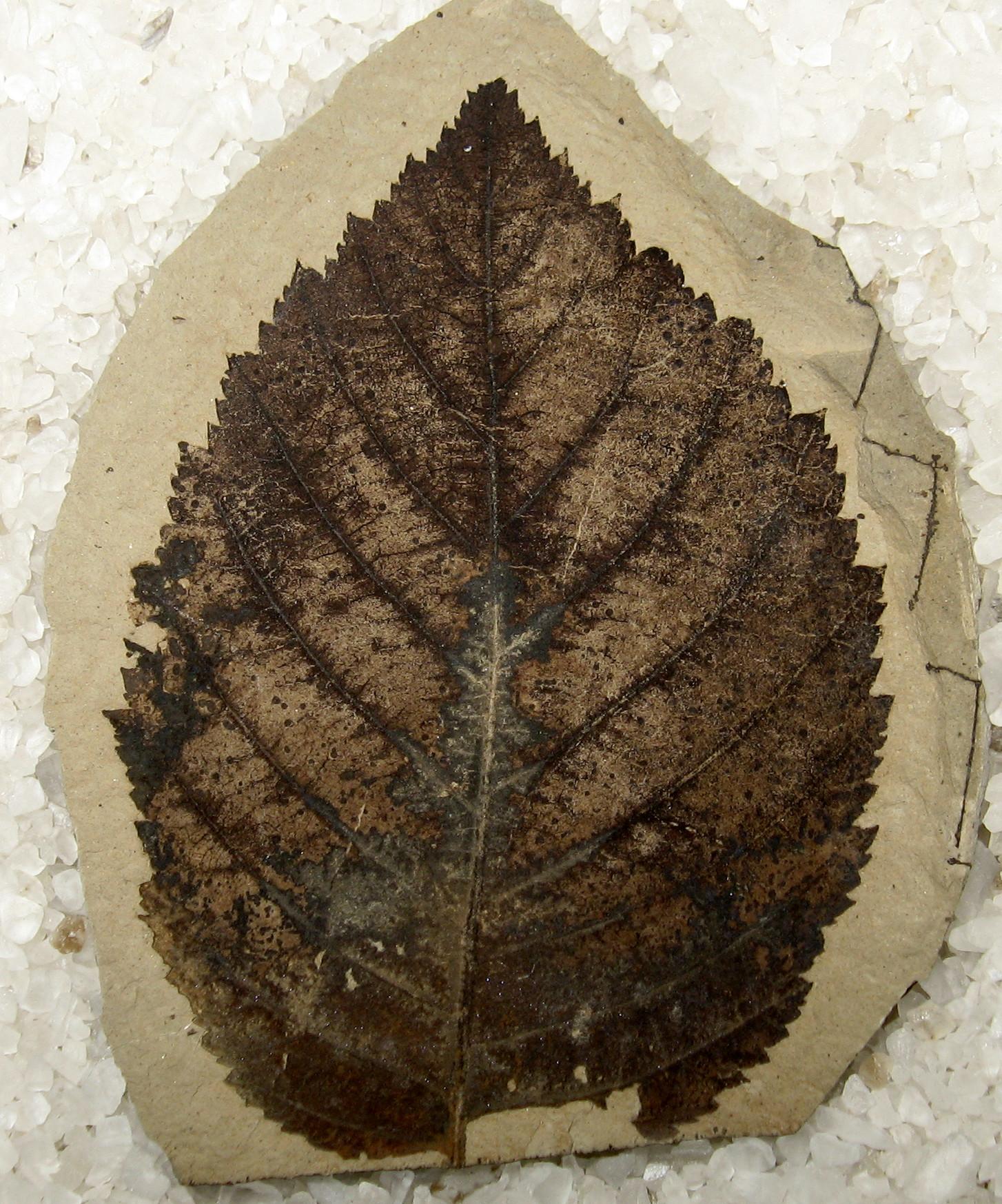
Fossil leaf of Betula leopoldae

Within Betulaceae, birches are most closely related to alder. The oldest known birch fossils are those of Betula leopoldae from the Klondike Mountain Formation in the state of Washington, US, which date to the early Eocene (Ypresian) around 49 million years ago.

== Ecology ==
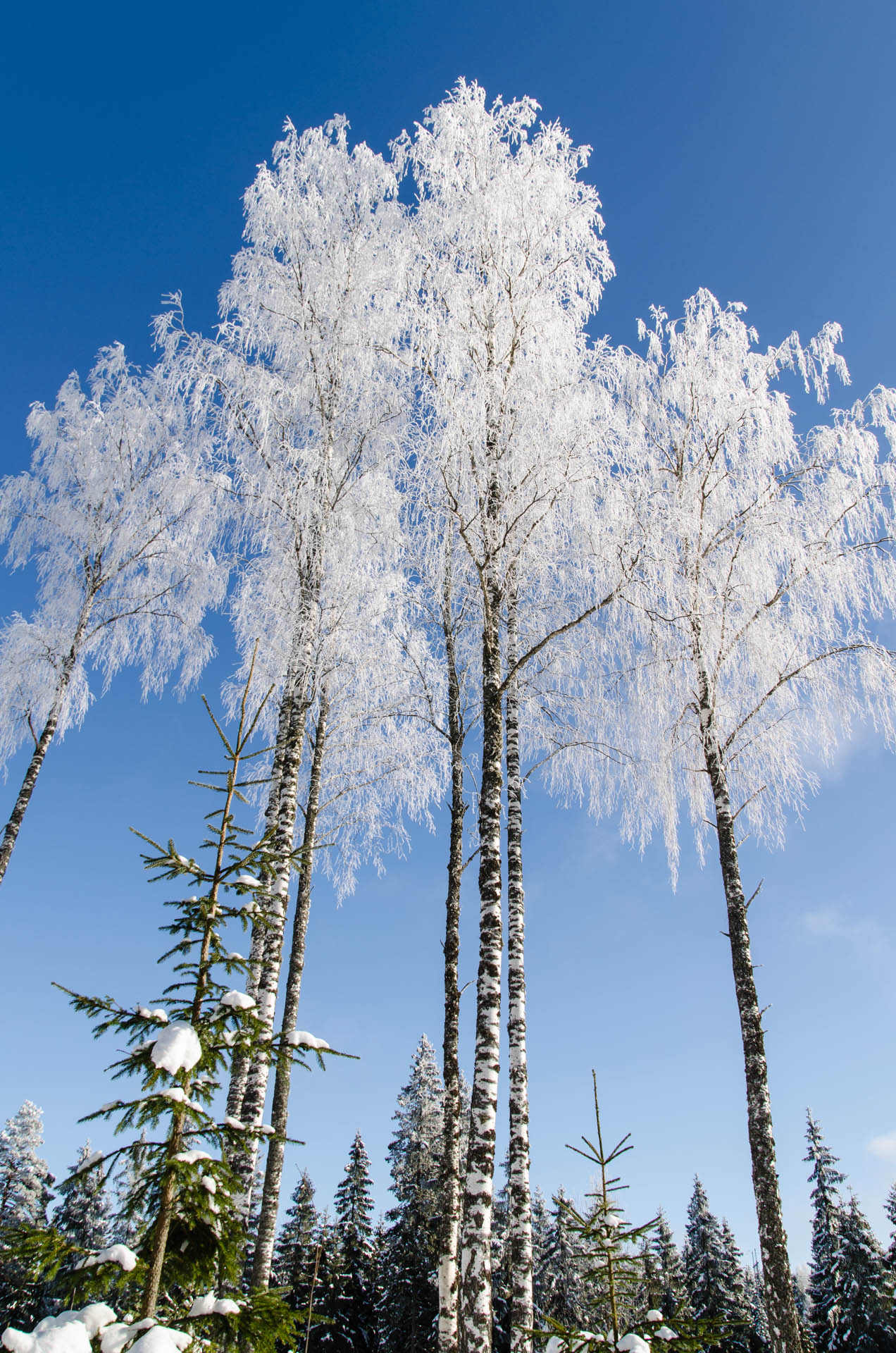
Frosty birches in Kangasala, Finland in February 2013

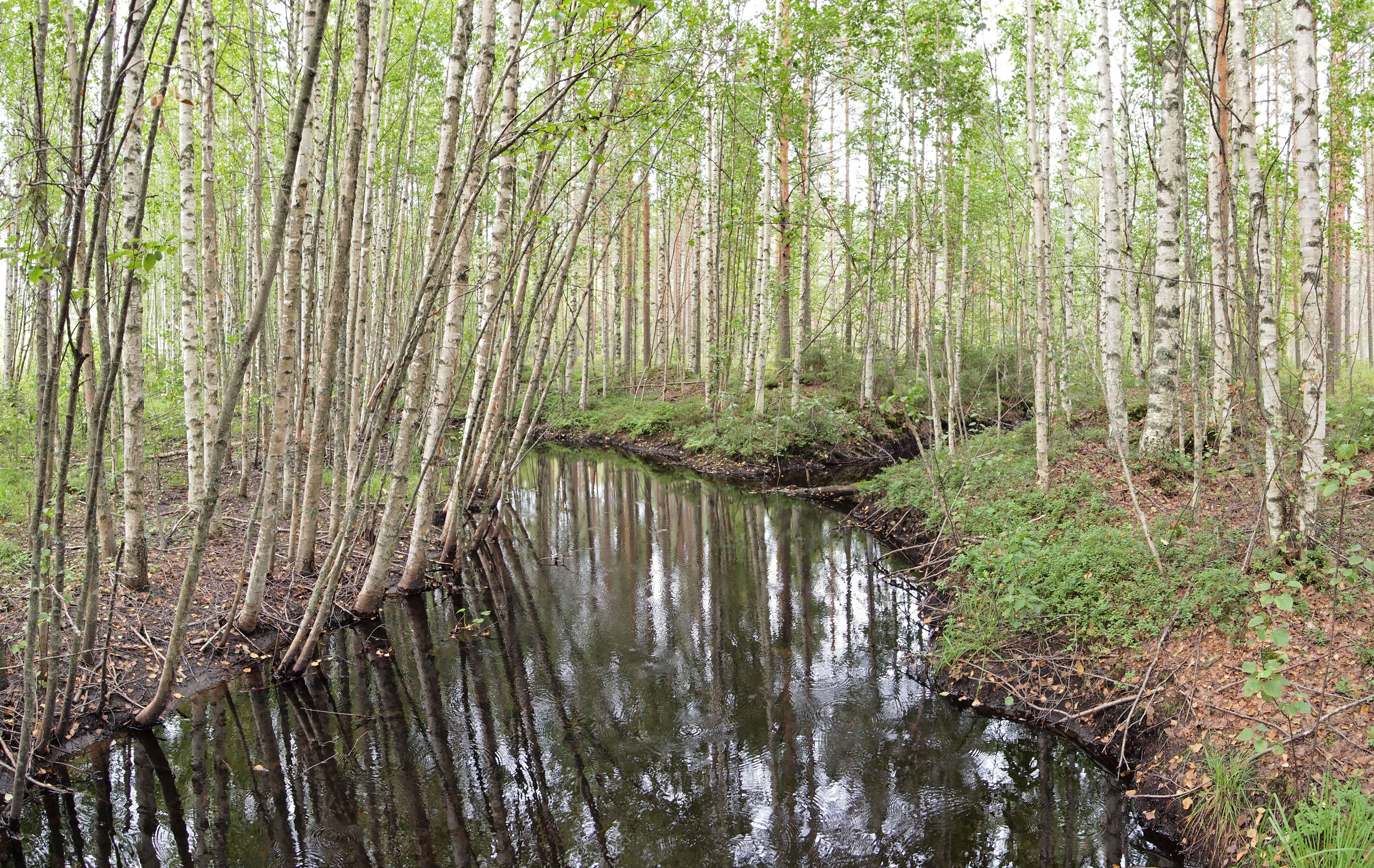
Birch trees by a river in Hankasalmi, Finland

A stand of birch trees

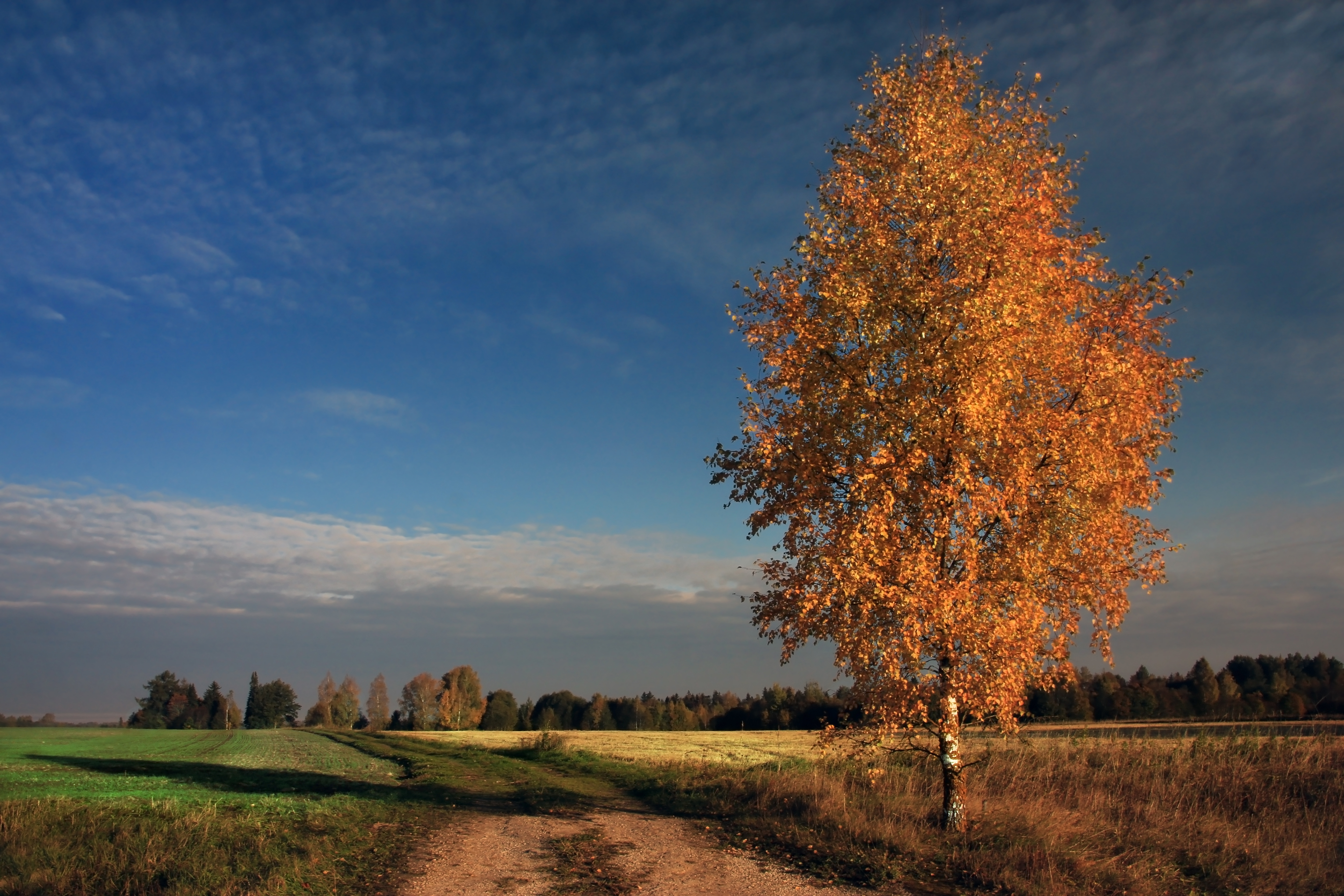
A birch tree in autumn

Birches often form even-aged stands on light, well-drained, particularly acidic soils. They are regarded as pioneer species, rapidly colonizing open ground especially in secondary successional sequences following a disturbance or fire. Birches are early tree species to become established in primary successions, and can become a threat to heathland if the seedlings and saplings are not suppressed by grazing or periodic burning. Birches are generally lowland species, but some species, such as Betula nana, have a montane distribution. In the British Isles, there is some difference between the environments of Betula pendula and Betula pubescens, and some hybridization, though both are "opportunists in steady-state woodland systems". Mycorrhizal fungi, including sheathing (ecto)mycorrhizas, are found in some cases to be beneficial to tree growth.

A large number of lepidopteran insects feed on birch foliage.

== Uses ==
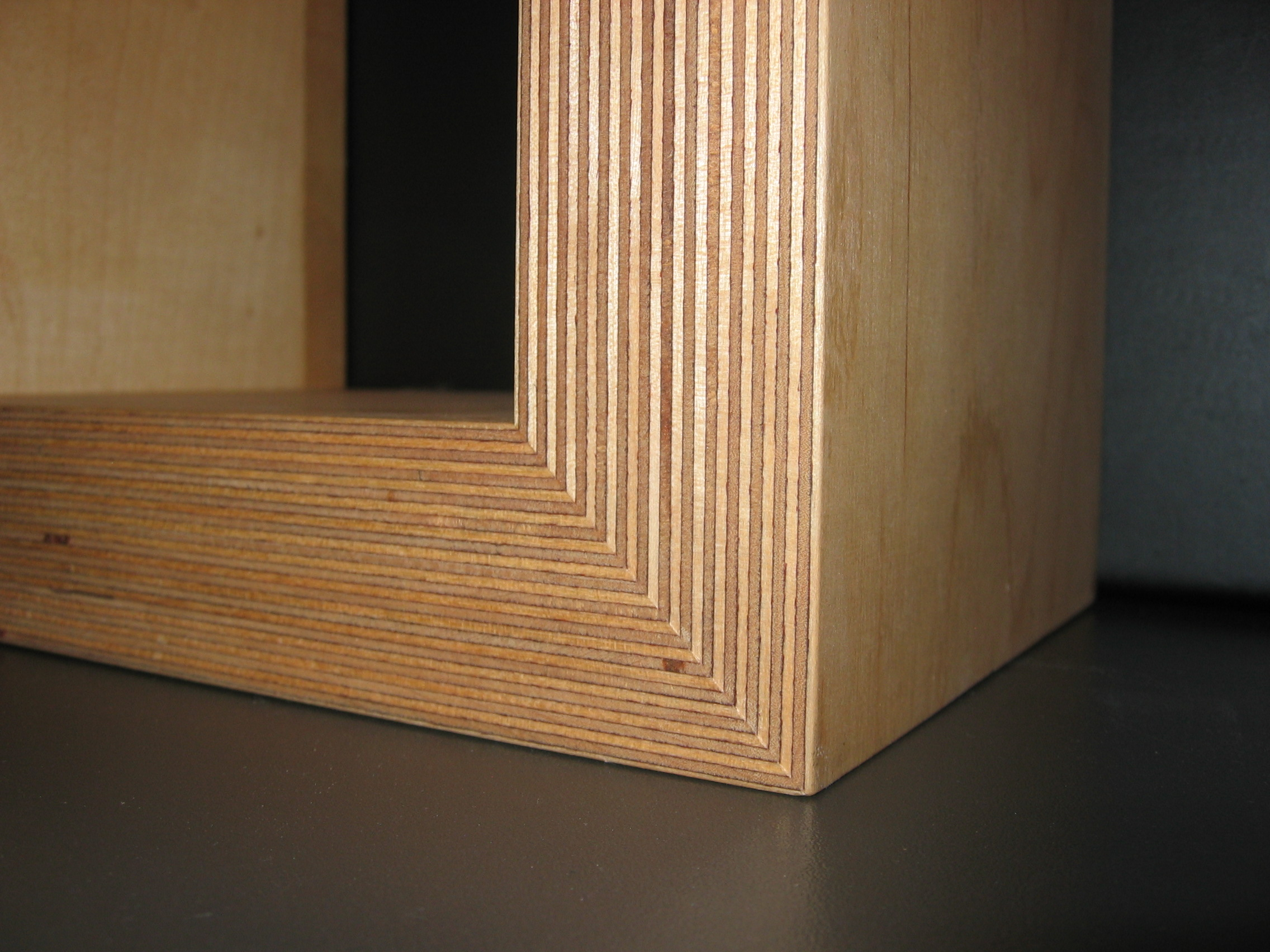
Birch plywood

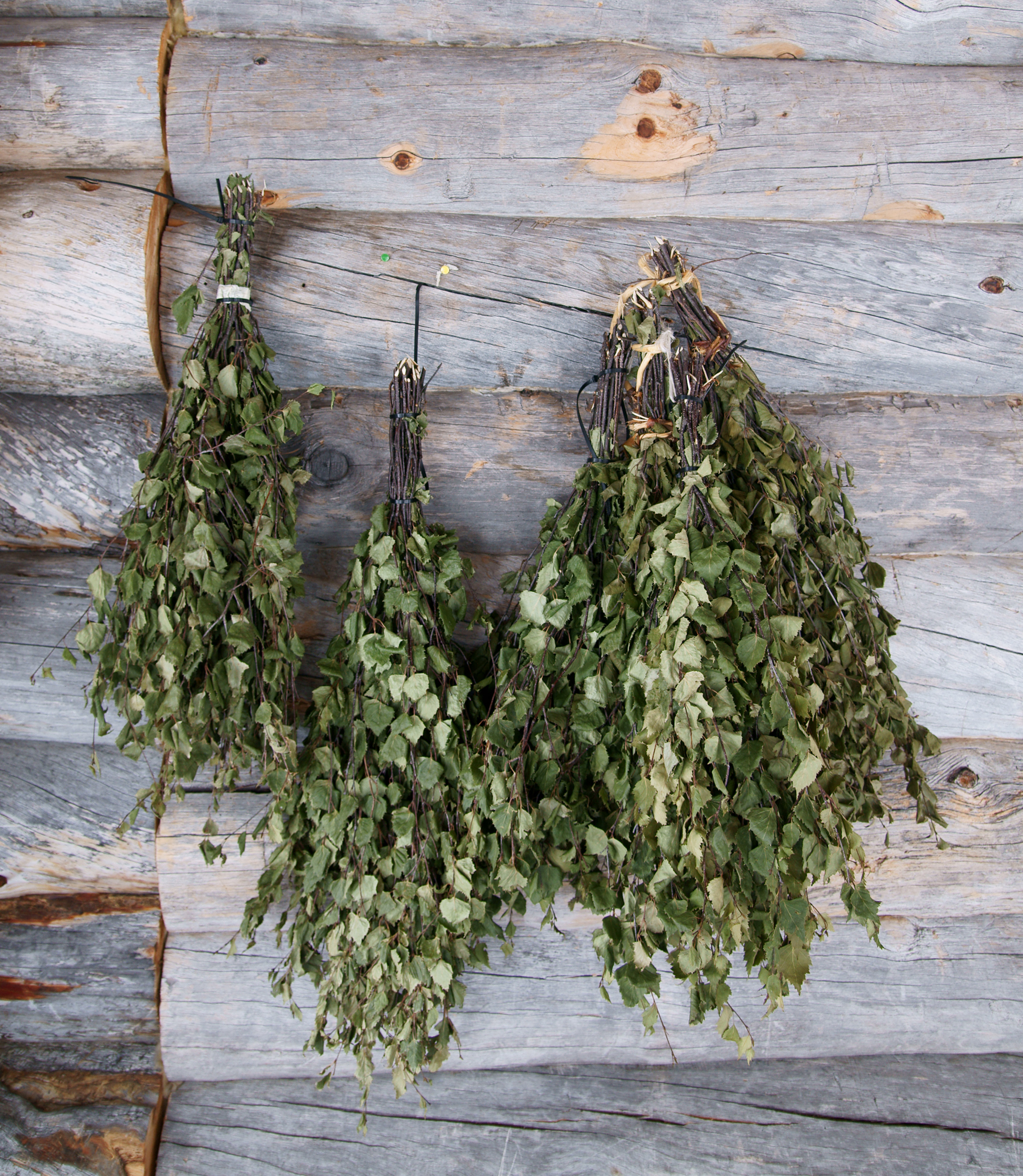
Finnish bath broom called vihta/vasta, braided from birch twigs

Because of the hardness of birch, it is easier to shape it with power tools; it is quite difficult to work it with hand tools.

- Birch wood is fine-grained and pale in colour, often with an attractive satin-like sheen. Ripple figuring may occur, increasing the value of the timber for veneer and furniture-making. The highly decorative Masur (or Karelian) birch, from Betula verrucosa var. carelica, has ripple textures combined with attractive dark streaks and lines.
- Birch plywood is made from laminations of birch veneer. It is light but strong, and has many other good properties. It is among the strongest and dimensionally most stable plywoods, although it is unsuitable for exterior use. Birch plywood is used to make longboards (skateboard), giving it a strong yet flexible ride. It is also used (often in very thin grades with many laminations) for making model aircraft.
- Birch wood is often used in the manufacture of popsicle sticks due to its durability, smoothness and neutral flavour.
- Extracts of birch are used for flavoring and leather oil, and in cosmetics such as soap and shampoo. In the past, commercial oil of wintergreen (methyl salicylate) was made from the sweet birch (Betula lenta).
- Birch-tar or Russian oil extracted from birch bark is thermoplastic and waterproof; it was used as a glue on, for example, arrows, and also for medicinal purposes.
- Fragrant twigs of silver and downy birches are used in saunas.
- Birch is also associated with the feast of Pentecost in Central and Eastern Europe and Siberia, where its branches are used as decoration for churches and homes on this day.
- Ground birch bark, fermented in sea water, is used for seasoning the woolen, hemp or linen sails and hemp rope of traditional Norwegian boats.
- Birch twigs bound in a bundle, also called birch, were used for birching, a form of corporal punishment.
- Many Native Americans in the United States and Indigenous peoples in Canada prize the birch for its bark, which because of its light weight, flexibility, and the ease with which it can be stripped from fallen trees, is often used for the construction of strong, waterproof but lightweight canoes, bowls, and wigwams.
- The Hughes H-4 Hercules was made mostly of birch wood, despite its better-known moniker, "The Spruce Goose".
- Birch plywood was specified by the BBC as the only wood that can be used in making the cabinets of the long-lived LS3/5A loudspeaker.
- Birch is used as firewood because of its high calorific value per unit weight and unit volume. It burns well, without popping, even when frozen, or freshly hewn. The bark will burn very well even when wet because of the oils it contains. With care, it can be split into very thin sheets that will ignite from even the smallest of sparks. Birch wood can be used to smoke foods.
- Birch seeds are used as leaf litter in miniature terrain models.
- Birch oil is used in the manufacture of Russia leather, a water-resistant leather.

=== As food ===
The inner bark is considered edible as an emergency food, even when raw. It can be dried and ground into flour, as was done by Native Americans and early settlers. It can also be cut into strips and cooked like noodles.

The sap can be drunk or used to make syrup and birch beer. Tea can be made from the red inner bark of black birches.

=== Cultivation ===
White-barked birches in particular are cultivated as ornamental trees, largely for their appearance in winter. The Himalayan birch, Betula utilis, especially the variety or subspecies jacquemontii, is among the most widely planted for this purpose. It has been cultivated since the 1870s, and many cultivars are available, including 'Doorenbos', 'Grayswood Ghost' and 'Silver Shadow'; 'Knightshayes' has a slightly weeping habit. Other species with ornamental white bark include Betula ermanii, Betula papyrifera, Betula pendula and Betula raddeana.

=== Medical ===
==== Approved topical medicine ====
In the European Union, a prescription gel containing birch bark extract (commercial name Episalvan, betulae cortex dry extract (5–10 : 1); extraction solvent: n-heptane 95% (w/w)) was approved in 2016 for the topical treatment of minor skin wounds in adults. Although its mechanism of action in helping to heal injured skin is not fully understood, birch bark extract appears to stimulate the growth of keratinocytes which then fill the wound.

==== Research and traditional medicine ====
Preliminary research indicates that the phytochemicals, betulin and possibly other triterpenes, are active in Episalvan gel and wound healing properties of birch bark.

Over centuries, birch bark was used in traditional medicine practices by North American indigenous people for treating superficial wounds by applying bark directly to the skin. Splints made with birch bark were used as casts for broken limbs in the 16th century.

=== Paper ===
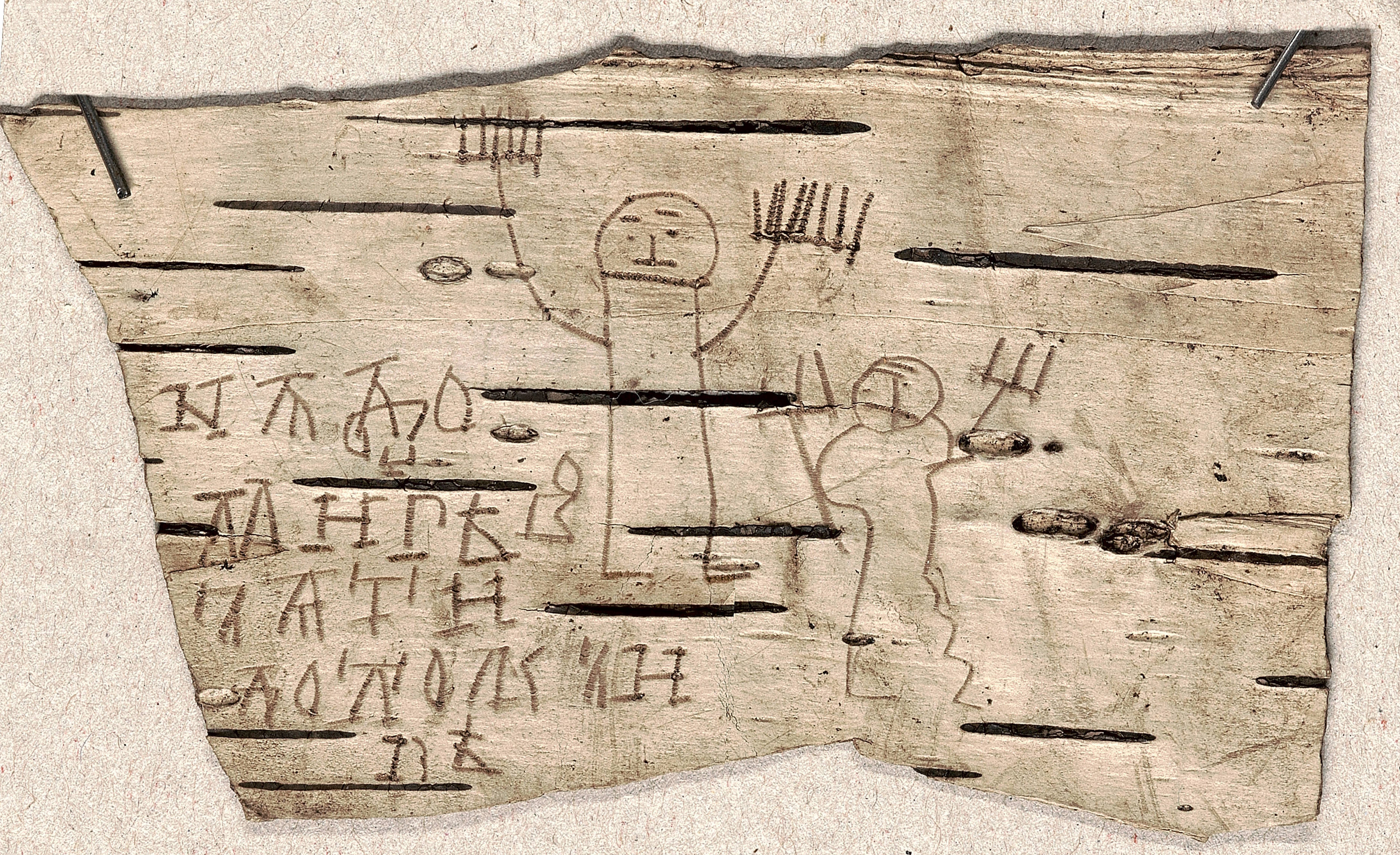
A birch bark inscription excavated from Novgorod, c. 1240–1260

Wood pulp made from birch gives relatively long and slender fibres for a hardwood. The thin walls cause the fibre to collapse upon drying, giving a paper with low bulk and low opacity. The birch fibres are, however, easily fibrillated and give about 75% of the tensile strength of softwood. The low opacity makes it suitable for making glassine.

In India, the birch (Sanskrit: भुर्ज, bhurja) holds great historical significance in the culture of North India, where the thin bark coming off in winter was extensively used as writing paper. Birch paper (Sanskrit: भुर्ज पत्र, bhurja patra) is exceptionally durable and was the material used for many ancient Indian texts. The Roman period Vindolanda tablets also use birch as a material on which to write and birch bark was used widely in ancient Russia as notepaper (beresta) and for decorative purposes and even making footwear (lapti) and baskets.

=== Use in musical instruments ===
Birch wood is sometimes used as a tonewood for semiacoustic and acoustic guitar bodies, and occasionally for solid-body guitar bodies. It is also a common material used in mallets for keyboard percussion. Drum manufacturers, such as Gretsch and Yamaha, have been known to use birch wood in the construction of drum shells, owing to its strength and colour which takes stain in an appealing way, and which can also amber over very well, while also giving the drums an appealing tone which changes depending on the type of birch used.

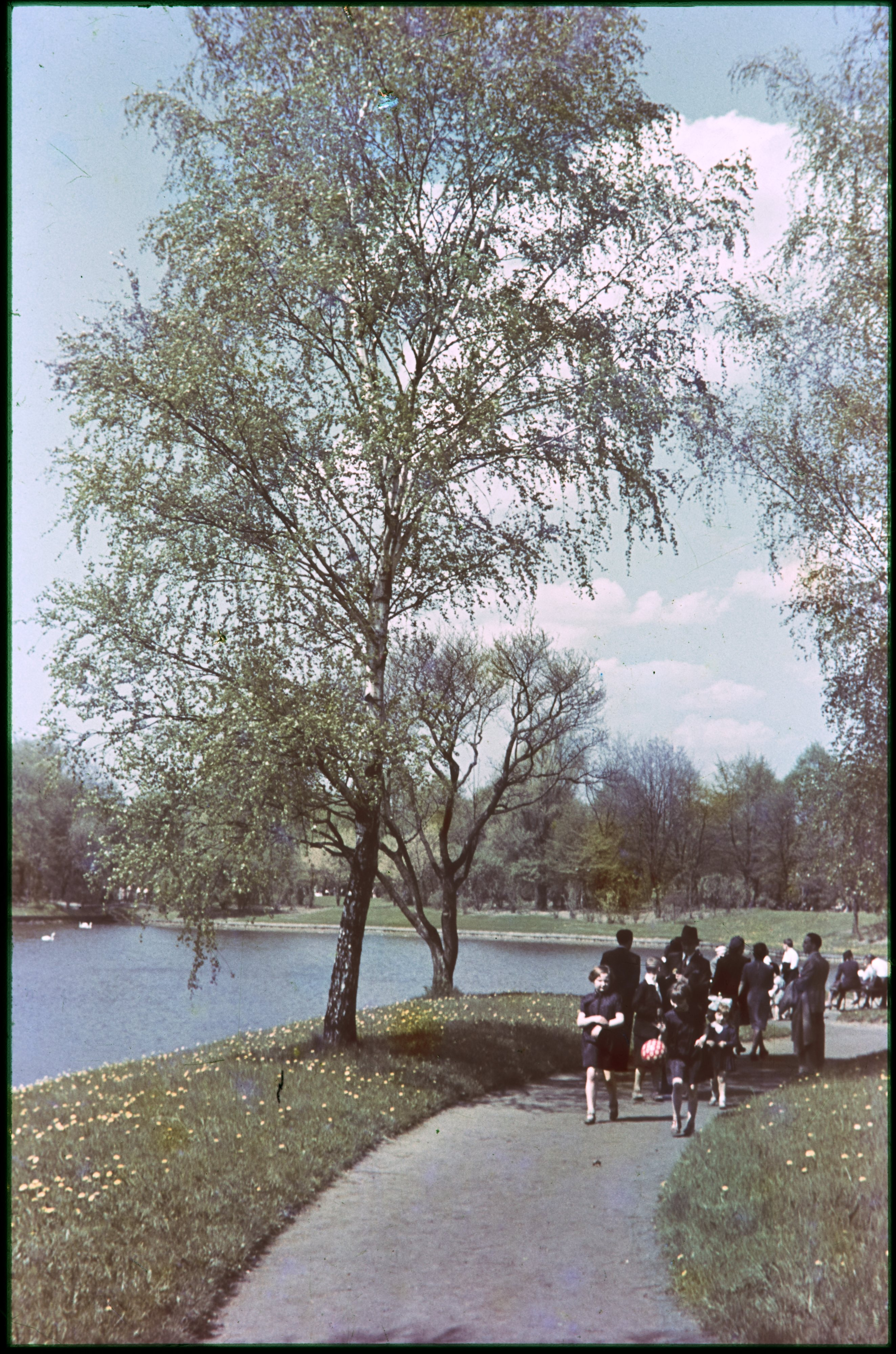
Birch trees in spring in a park in Warsaw, Poland (1939)

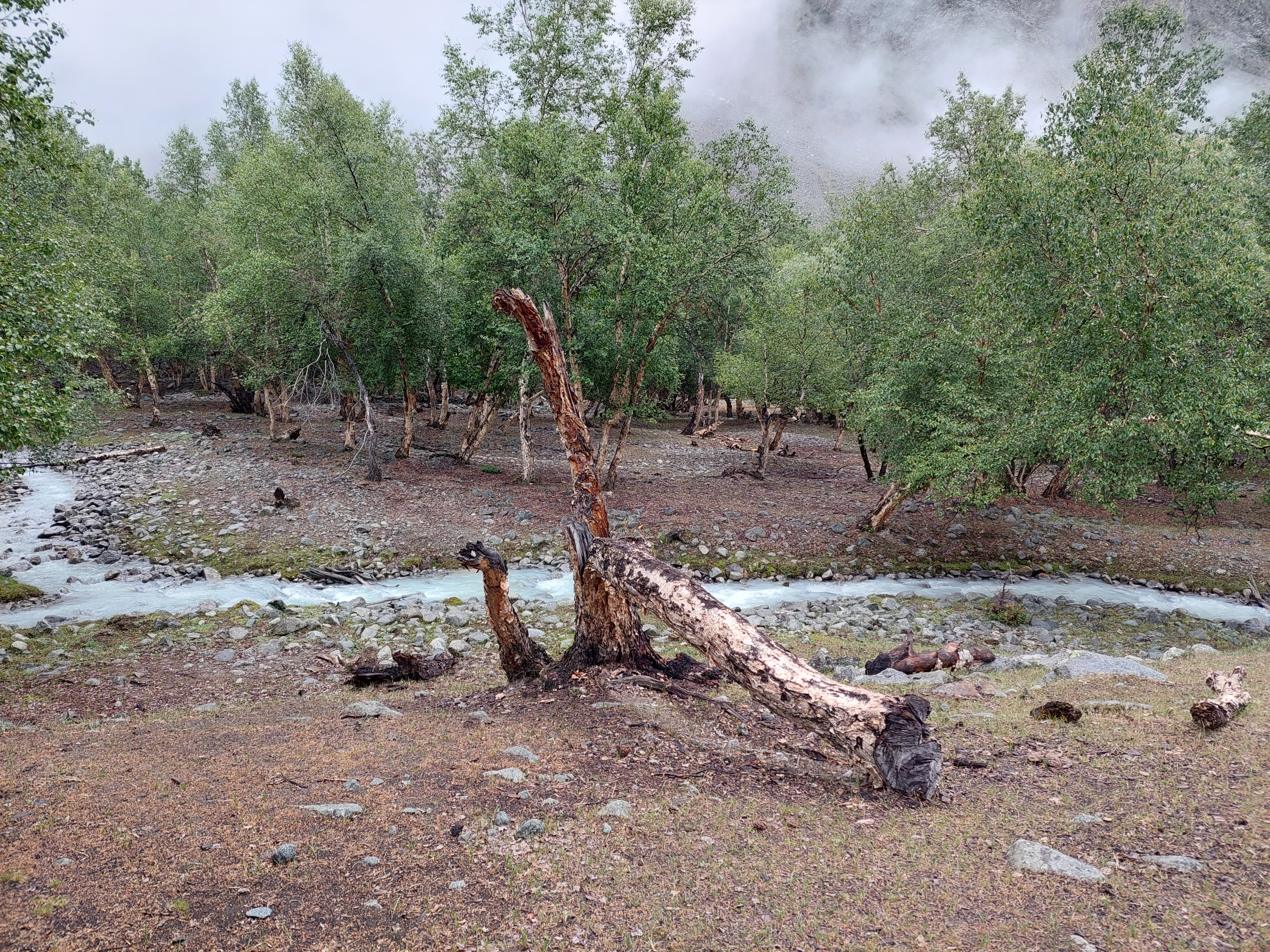
Birch tree forest at Ishkoman, Gilgit-Baltistan, Pakistan

== Culture ==
Birches have spiritual importance in several religions, both modern and historical. In Celtic cultures, the birch symbolises growth, renewal, stability, initiation, and adaptability because it is highly adaptive and able to sustain harsh conditions with casual indifference. Proof of this adaptability is seen in its easy and eager ability to repopulate areas damaged by forest fires or clearings. Birches are also associated with Tír na nÓg, the land of the dead and the Sidhe, in Gaelic folklore, and as such frequently appear in Scottish, Irish, and English folksongs and ballads in association with death, or fairies, or returning from the grave. The leaves of the silver birch tree are used in the festival of St George, held in Novosej and other villages in Albania.

Birch leaves in the coat of arms of Karjalohja

The birch is New Hampshire's state tree and the national tree of Finland and Russia. The yellow birch is the official tree of the province of Quebec (Canada). The birch is a very important element in Russian culture and represents the grace, strength, tenderness and natural beauty of Russian women as well as the closeness to nature of the Russians. It's associated with marriage and love. There are numerous folkloric Russian songs in which the birch tree occurs. The Ornäs birch is the national tree of Sweden. The Czech word for the month of March, Březen, is derived from the Czech word bříza meaning birch, as birch trees flower in March under local conditions. The silver birch tree is of special importance to the Swedish city of Umeå. In 1888, the Umeå city fire spread all over the city and nearly burnt it down to the ground, but some birches, supposedly, halted the spread of the fire. To protect the city against future fires, wide avenues were created, and these were lined with silver birch trees all over the city. Umeå later adopted the unofficial name of "City of the Birches (Björkarnas stad)". Also, the ice hockey team of Umeå is called Björklöven, translated to English "The Birch Leaves".

"Swinging" birch trees was a common game for American children in the nineteenth century. American poet Lucy Larcom's "Swinging on a Birch Tree" celebrates the game. The poem inspired Robert Frost, who pays homage to the act of climbing birch trees in his more famous poem, "Birches". Frost once told "it was almost sacrilegious climbing a birch tree till it bent, till it gave and swooped to the ground, but that's what boys did in those days".

== See also ==
- Birch bark
- Birch bark manuscript
- Taxonomy of Betula

== Sources ==
- Furlow, John J. (1997). "Betula". In Flora of North America Editorial Committee (ed.). Flora of North America North of Mexico (FNA). Vol. 3. New York and Oxford: Oxford University Press – via eFloras.org, Missouri Botanical Garden, St. Louis, MO & Harvard University Herbaria, Cambridge, MA.
- Li, Pei-chun; Skvortsov, Alexei K. "Betula". Flora of China. Vol. 4 – via eFloras.org, Missouri Botanical Garden, St. Louis, MO & Harvard University Herbaria, Cambridge, MA.
- Grimshaw, John (2009). New Trees, Recent introductions to cultivation. Kew Publishing, RBG Kew. pp. 163–174.
- Chisholm, Hugh, ed. (1911). "Birch" . Encyclopædia Britannica. Vol. 3 (11th ed.). Cambridge University Press.
- Jonczak, Jerzy; Jankiewicz, Urszula; Kondras, Marek; Kruczkowska, Bogusława; Oktaba, Lidia; Oktaba, Jarosław; Olejniczak, Izabella; Pawłowicz, Edyta; Polláková, Nora; Raab, Thomas; Regulska, Edyta; Słowińska, Sandra; Sut-Lohmann, Magdalena (December 2020). "The influence of birch trees (Betula spp.) on soil environment – A review". Forest Ecology and Management. 477 118486. Bibcode:2020ForEM.47718486J. doi:10.1016/j.foreco.2020.118486.
