= Betula ashburneri =

Conservation status
- Least Concern (IUCN 3.1)

Scientific classification
- Kingdom: Plantae
- Clade: Tracheophytes
- Clade: Angiosperms
- Clade: Eudicots
- Clade: Rosids
- Order: Fagales
- Family: Betulaceae
- Genus: Betula
- Species: B. ashburneri

Binomial name
- Betula ashburneri McAll. & Rushforth

Species of plant

Betula ashburneri is a species of flowering plant in the birch family Betulaceae. It is native to the eastern Himalayas; Bhutan, Tibet, southwestern Sichuan, northwestern Yunnan, and northern Myanmar. A shrub or tree reaching 10 m (33 ft), it is typically found at or just below the tree line at elevations from 3,000 to 4,065 m (9,800 to 13,300 ft). It has been assessed as Least Concern, and is occasionally available from commercial suppliers.
