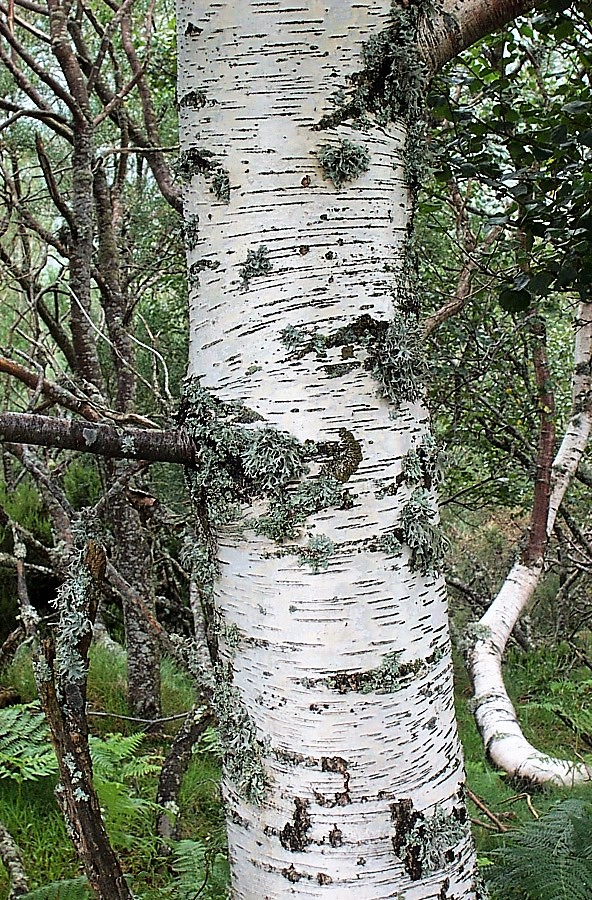
- Bark

Conservation status
- Data Deficient (IUCN 3.1)

Scientific classification
- Kingdom: Plantae
- Clade: Tracheophytes
- Clade: Angiosperms
- Clade: Eudicots
- Clade: Rosids
- Order: Fagales
- Family: Betulaceae
- Genus: Betula
- Species: B. celtiberica

Binomial name
- Betula celtiberica Rothm. & Vasc.

Synonyms
- Betula pubescens subsp. celtiberica (Rothm. & Vasc.) Rivas Mart.

= Betula celtiberica =

Species of plant

Betula celtiberica, the Iberian white birch, is a species of flowering plant in the family Betulaceae, native to Great Britain, northwestern Spain and Portugal. In Spain is it often found on north-facing valley slopes, forming mixed mesic forests with the common beech Fagus sylvatica. Some authors, particularly in Britain, treat it as a subspecies of Betula pubescens (downy birch), with the suggestion that it is a stabilised hybrid between that and Betula pendula (silver birch).
