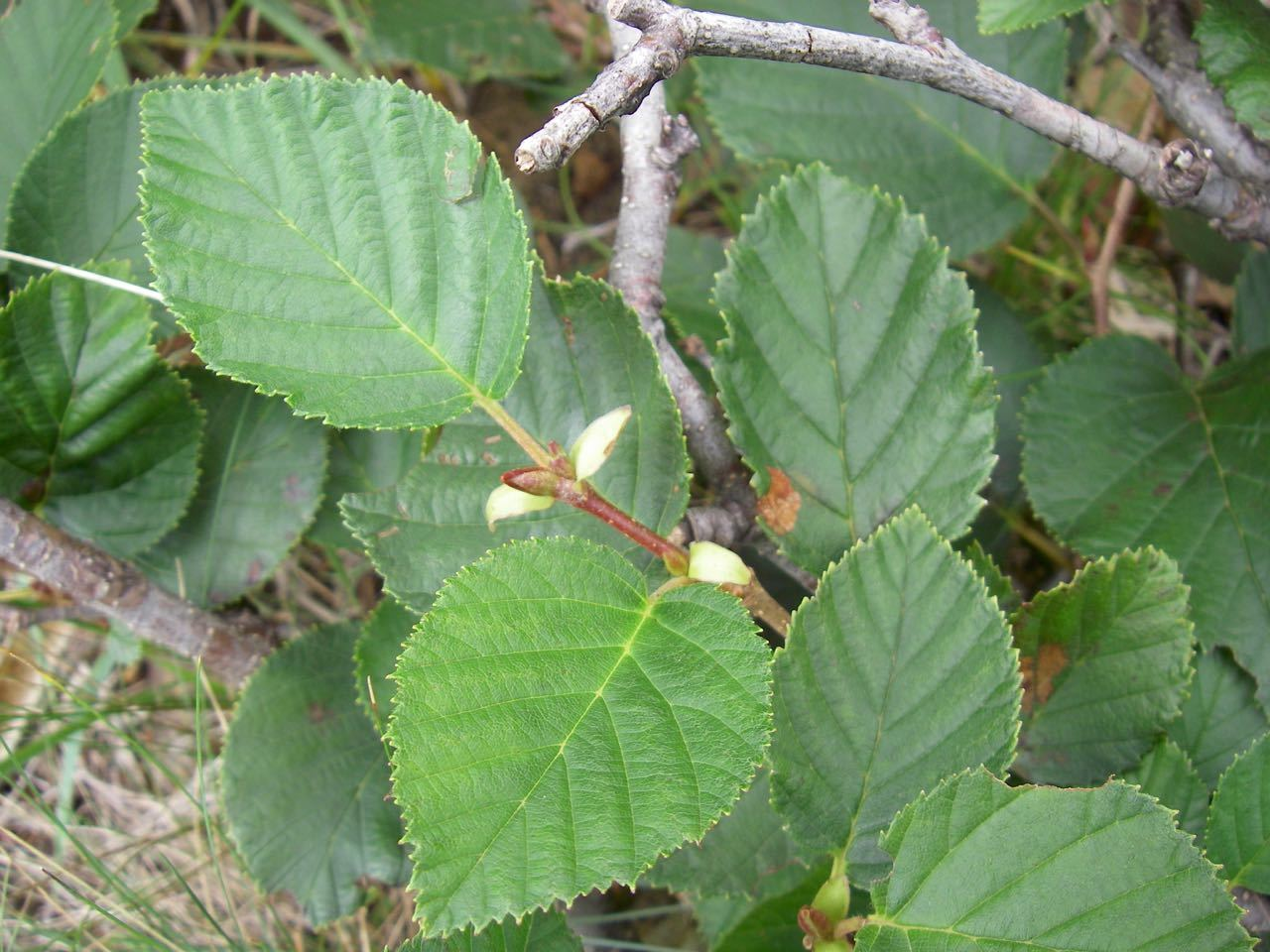

Conservation status
- Least Concern (IUCN 3.1)

Scientific classification
- Kingdom: Plantae
- Clade: Embryophytes
- Clade: Tracheophytes
- Clade: Angiosperms
- Clade: Eudicots
- Clade: Rosids
- Order: Fagales
- Family: Betulaceae
- Genus: Betula
- Species: B. gmelinii

Binomial name
- Betula gmelinii Bunge

Synonyms
- List: Betula apoiensis Nakai ex H.Hara; Betula fruticosa subsp. gmelinii (Bunge) Kitag.; Betula fruticosa var. gmelinii (Bunge) Regel; Betula miyoshii Nakai; Betula niijimae Nakai; Chamaebetula gmelinii (Bunge) Opiz

= Betula gmelinii =

Species of tree

Betula gmelinii is a species of birch native to the Altai, Siberia, Mongolia, northeastern China, the Korean Peninsula, and Hokkaido in Japan. It prefers to live in sandy soils. Its 'Mount Apoi' cultivar has gained the Royal Horticultural Society's Award of Garden Merit.
