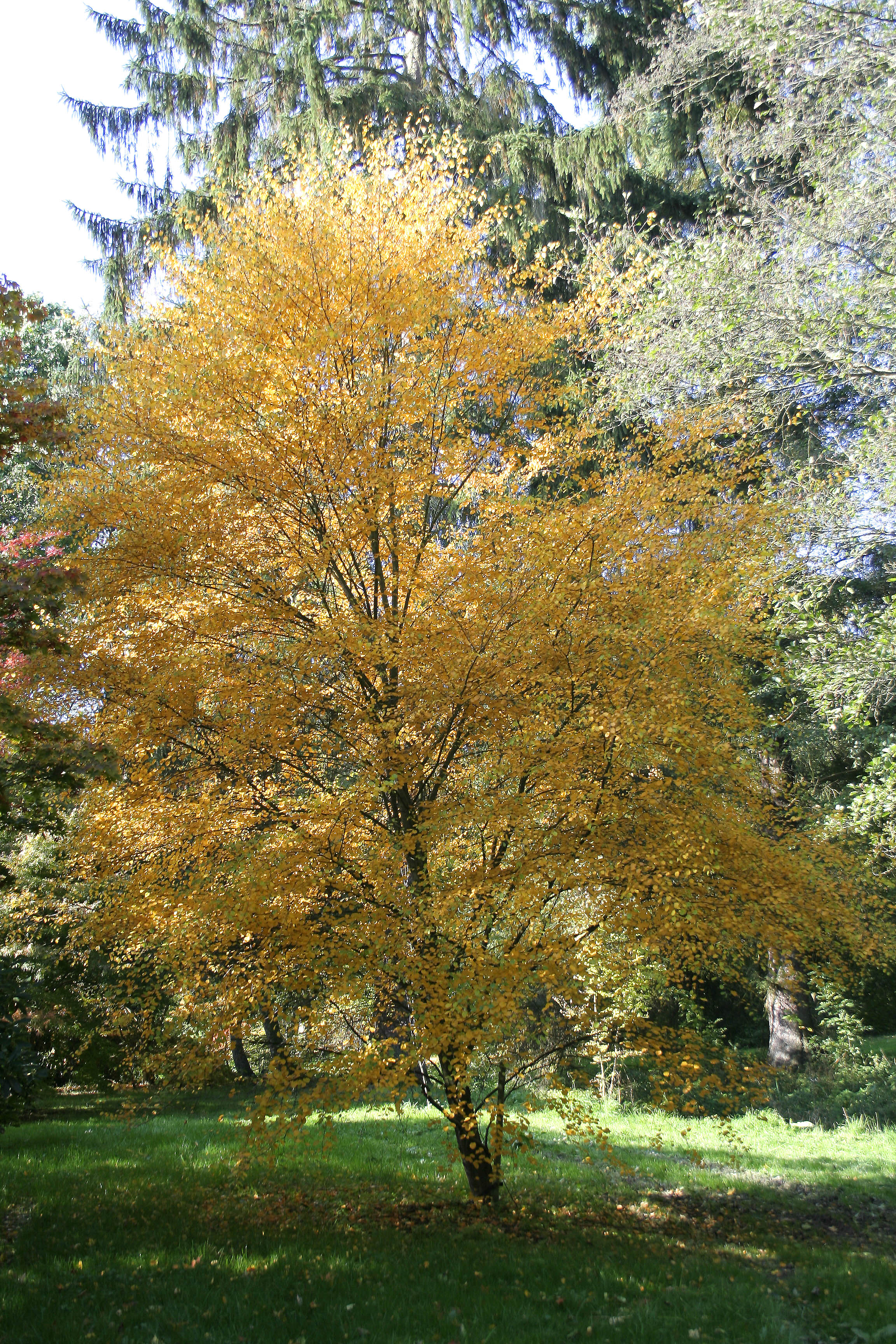

Conservation status
- Critically Endangered (IUCN 2.3)

- Threatened (ESA)

Scientific classification
- Kingdom: Plantae
- Clade: Tracheophytes
- Clade: Angiosperms
- Clade: Eudicots
- Clade: Rosids
- Order: Fagales
- Family: Betulaceae
- Genus: Betula
- Species: B. uber

Binomial name
- Betula uber (Ashe) Fern.
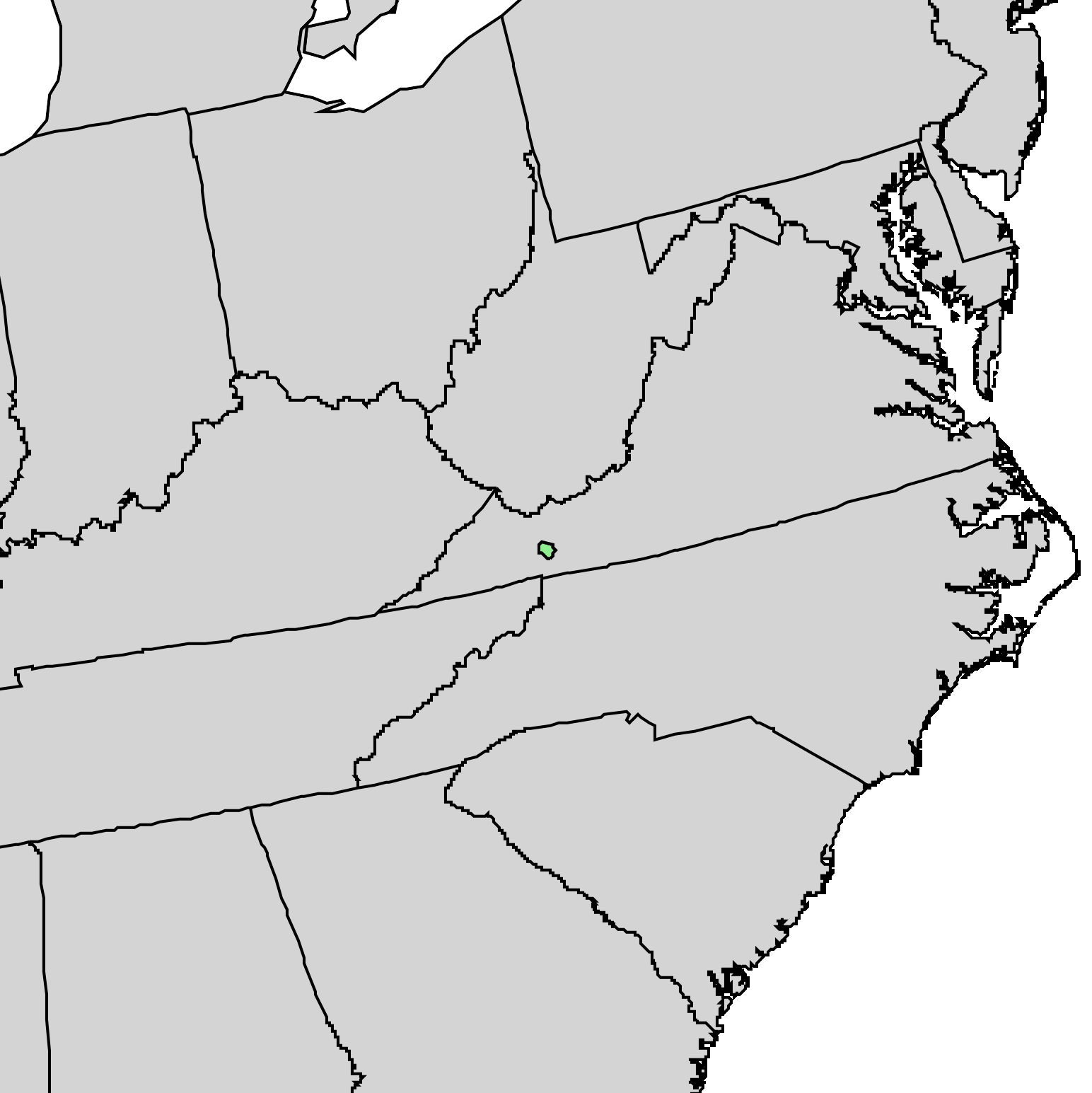
- Natural range of Betula uber

Synonyms
- Betula lenta var. uber; Betula lenta subsp. uber

= Betula uber =

Species of birch

Betula uber, the Virginia round-leaf birch, is a rare species of tree in the birch family. One of the most endangered species of North American trees, it is endemic to Smyth County, in the U.S. state of Virginia. It is part of the temperate broadleaf and mixed forests biome.

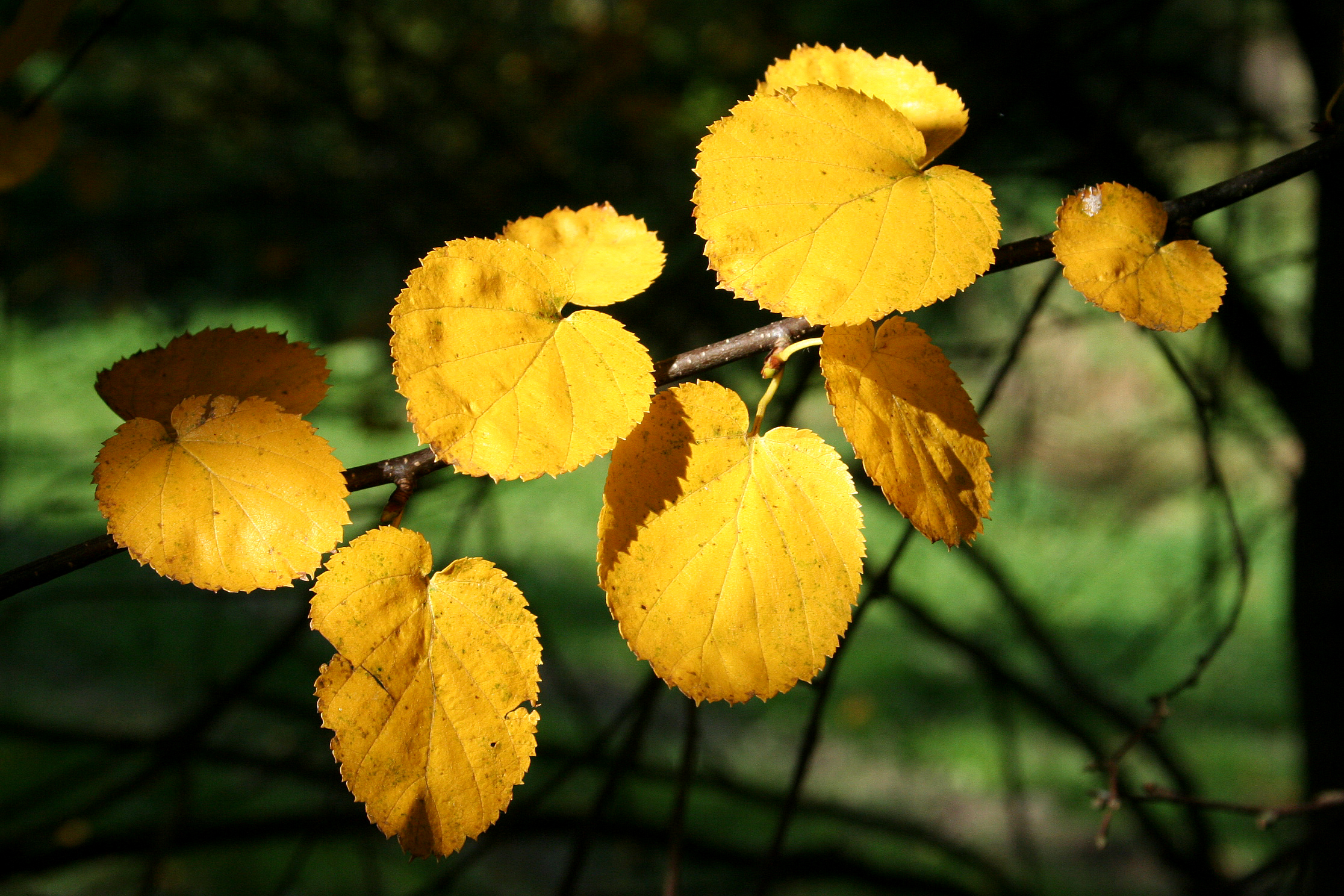
Leaves

== Description ==
It is a moderately sized tree, growing up to 15 metres (49 ft) tall. The crown is compact. The bark is aromatic and dark brown or black in color. The leaf is round or slightly oval with a heart-shaped base and a toothed edge and measures up to 5 centimetres (2.0 in) long. The catkin is up to 2.8 centimetres (1.1 in) long and contains tiny samaras measuring 2 millimeters in length. The tree is wind-pollinated and reproduces by seed. Seed production is much heavier in some years than in others. The tree's lifespan is around 50 years.

== Taxonomy ==
The tree was first described in 1914 as a variety of Betula lenta, and elevated to species status in 1945. The cladistics of the tree remain unresolved. It hybridizes with B. lenta and it has been suggested that it is actually a round-leaved mutant form of B. lenta. Some authorities prefer to treat it as a variety.

== Conservation ==
After it was first discovered in 1914, the tree was not seen again and was thought to be extinct until 1975, when some individuals were found. These 18 adult trees and 23 saplings and seedlings were in a forest along the degraded banks of Cressy Creek on Smyth County, Virginia. The tree was federally listed as an endangered species and conservation efforts began. Many seedlings were sprouted in greenhouses and planted in the forest. By 1995, there were 20 populations and it had been downlisted to threatened status in December 1994. The tree was propagated in order to discourage collectors from taking wild specimens, or vandals from destroying them. A recent count estimated 961 individuals in the wild as of 2006. Eight of these are in the original creekside population. The species will not be removed from the endangered species list yet because it has not been observed reproducing sexually, and naturally, more than once. The expansion of its range is limited because the area is surrounded by agricultural land, but the territory on which the tree occurs is not immediately threatened. NatureServe considers the species Critically Imperiled.
