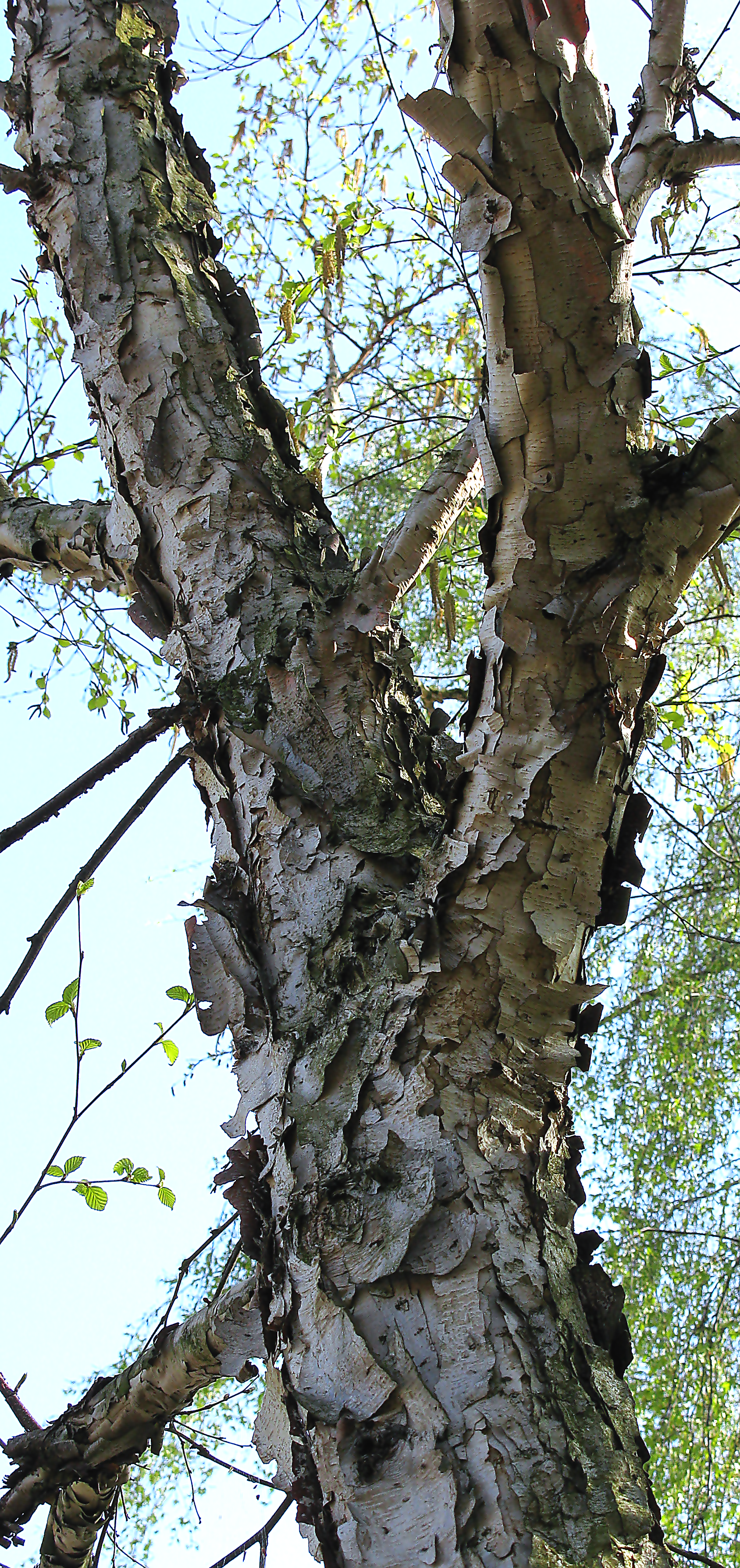

Conservation status
- Least Concern (IUCN 3.1)

Scientific classification
- Kingdom: Plantae
- Clade: Embryophytes
- Clade: Tracheophytes
- Clade: Angiosperms
- Clade: Eudicots
- Clade: Rosids
- Order: Fagales
- Family: Betulaceae
- Genus: Betula
- Species: B. costata

Binomial name
- Betula costata Trautv.

Synonyms
- Betula costata var. pubescens S.L.Liou; Betula ermanii var. costata (Trautv.) Regel; Betula ermanii f. costata (Trautv.) Regel; Betula ulmifolia var. costata (Trautv.) Regel

= Betula costata =

Species of flowering plant

Betula costata is a species of tree belonging to the family Betulaceae.

Its native range is northern China, Korea, and the southern Russian Far East.
