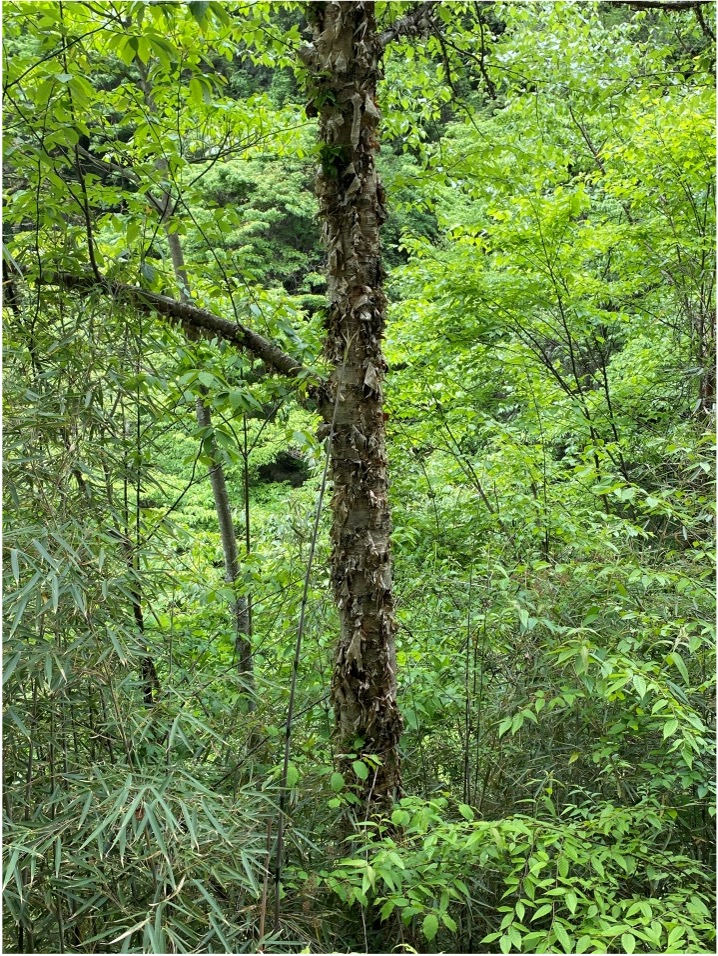

Scientific classification
- Kingdom: Plantae
- Clade: Tracheophytes
- Clade: Angiosperms
- Clade: Eudicots
- Clade: Rosids
- Order: Fagales
- Family: Betulaceae
- Genus: Betula
- Species: B. buggsii

Binomial name
- Betula buggsii Wang & Cheek

= Betula buggsii =

Species of broadleaved tree

Betula buggsii is a species of broadleaved tree that grows in the Qinling–Daba Mountains in China. Its Chinese name is “秦巴桦” (qín bā huà). The species was discovered by Dr Nian Wang of Shandong Agricultural University in 2021, as he sampled Chinese birch trees for a population genetic analysis. Initially he considered the trees to be Betula utilis ssp. albosinensis but genetic analysis showed the trees to be very different, and in fact, less closely related to Betula utilis ssp. albosinensis than several other birch species. In addition, the trees were diploid, whereas B. utilis ssp. utilis and B. utilis ssp. albosinensis are tetraploid. Closer analysis of the morphology of the trees also showed important differences with Betula utilis ssp. albosinensis. Nian Wang therefore described a new species, naming it B. buggsii after his former PhD supervisor, Richard Buggs.
