= Betula × purpusii =

Conservation status
- Critically Endangered (IUCN 3.1)

- Critically Imperiled (NatureServe)

Scientific classification
- Kingdom: Plantae
- Clade: Embryophytes
- Clade: Tracheophytes
- Clade: Spermatophytes
- Clade: Angiosperms
- Clade: Eudicots
- Clade: Rosids
- Order: Fagales
- Family: Betulaceae
- Genus: Betula
- Species: B. × purpusii

Binomial name
- Betula × purpusii C.K.Schneid.

Synonyms
- Betula × purpusii var. typica C.K.Schneid.; Betula × murrayana B.V.Barnes & Dancik

Species of plant

Betula × purpusii is a species of birch native to the north-central United States and southern Ontario, Canada. It is a naturally-occurring hybrid of the species B. alleghaniensis and B. pumila.

Under the synonym Betula × murrayana or Murray birch, it is assessed as a critically endangered species.

== Description ==
The tree can be up to 15 meters in height and usually has several trunks. The bark of the mature trees is usually dark red-reddish brown and has horizontally-expanded lenticels. Its leaves are 5–11 centimeters × 3–6 centimeters.

== Taxonomy ==
Betula × purpusii was described by Camillo Karl Schneider in 1904. Betula × murrayana was named by Burton V. Barnes and Bruce P. Dancik, in Canadian Journal of Botany 63(2):223-226, in 1985. The specific epithet honors Frank Murray, the person who discovered the Michigan population of the species. Betula × murrayana is an evolutionarily recent species that arose through hybridization between Betula alleghaniensis and Betula × purpusii. Betula murryana has a chromosome number of 2n=112, while B. alleghaniensis has 2n=84, B. pumila has 2n=56. and B. × purpusii has 2n=70. Plants of the World Online treats B. × murrayana as a synonym of B. × purpusii.

== Conservation ==
Betula × purpusii is native to Illinois, Michigan, Minnesota, Wisconsin, and southern Ontario, while synonym Betula × murrayana is known from only two sites, Washtenaw County, Michigan in the United States and St. Williams, Norfolk County, Ontario, in Canada. The Ontario population has not been re-located, despite searches, and its status is unclear. The Michigan population has only one surviving non-cultivated individual. However future populations may be discovered along the Great Lakes or St. Lawrence Valley, as there are many areas where the parent species overlap, and the species is a natural hybrid.

The Holden Arboretum, the University of Michigan, and Matthaei Botanical Gardens all have propagated seedlings from cuts of the Michigan individual, which could be used to conserve this species if it is faced with extinction.
