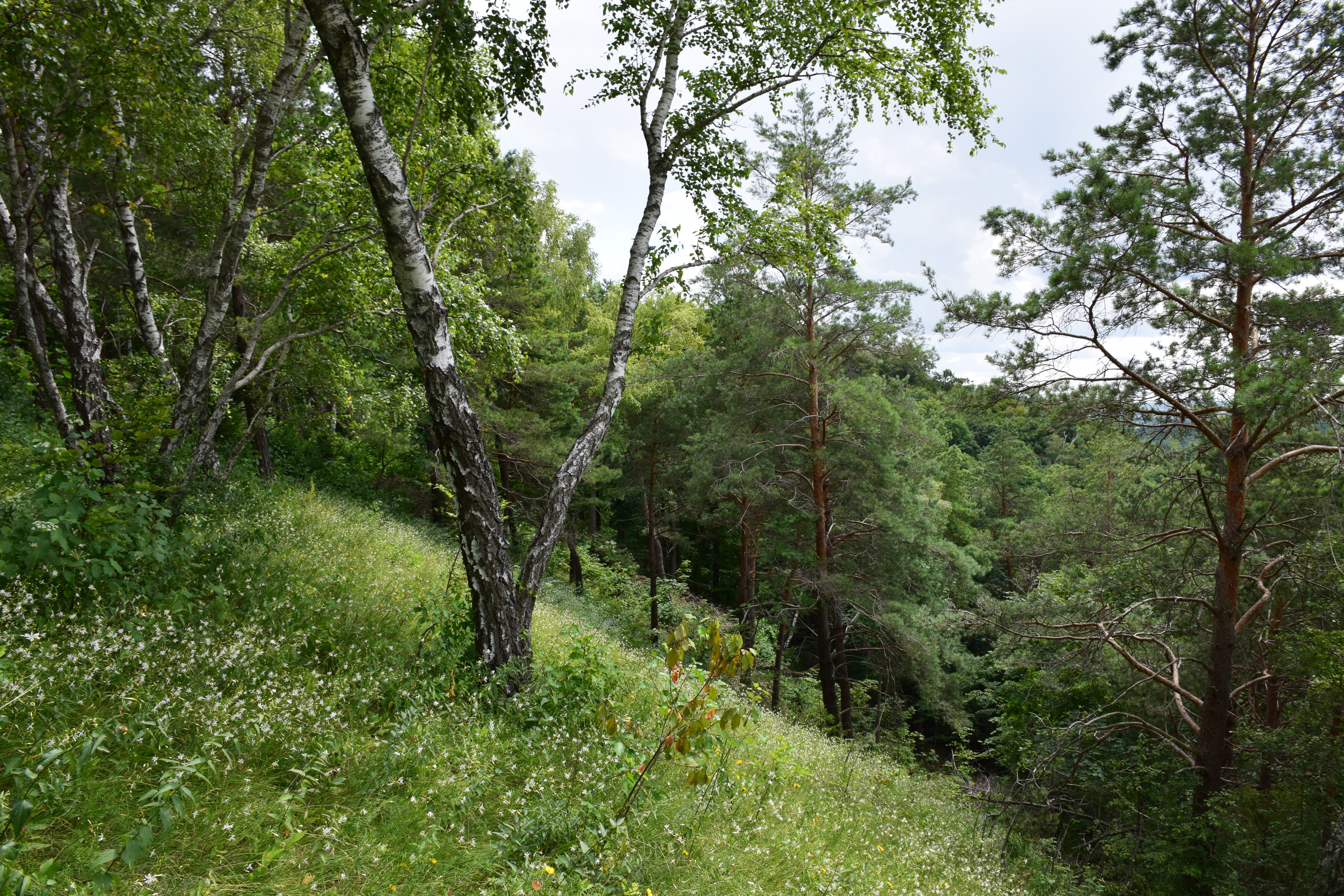

Conservation status
- Critically Endangered (IUCN 3.1)

Scientific classification
- Kingdom: Plantae
- Clade: Tracheophytes
- Clade: Angiosperms
- Clade: Eudicots
- Clade: Rosids
- Order: Fagales
- Family: Betulaceae
- Genus: Betula
- Species: B. klokovii

Binomial name
- Betula klokovii Zaver.

= Betula klokovii =

Species of flowering plant

Betula klokovii is a species of tree restricted to Ukraine. These trees grow on sandy hills in steppe grasses and dry chalkstone or in open woodlands. It is only found in two mountains: Strakhova and Maslyatyn, near Kremenets in the Ternopil region.

The extent of occurrence (EOO) is estimated to be less than 15 square kilometres (5.8 sq mi). There are two small subpopulations of this species. The larger has 40 mature individuals on the Maslyatyn mountain while the smaller has 10 mature individuals on the Strakhova mountain.

As of June 2015, the population trend is decreasing. The main threats are habitat transformation due to chalk quarrying and soil erosion. It is also threatened by hybridisation with other species, such as Betula pendula.

A national park in Kremenets Mountains has been created to protect the biodiversity of the area. Several individuals can be found in Ukrainian botanic gardens such as Kremenets Botanical Garden, Dendrological Park "Oleksandria", O.V. Fomin Botanical Garden, M.M.Gryshko National Botanical Garden. This species is listed in the Red Book of Ukraine as Critically Endangered.
