= Black birch =

Black birch is a common name for several trees, and may refer to:

- Asian black birch, the English name for Betula dahurica, tree species native to eastern Asia
- Black birch, a common name for Betula lenta, also known as sweet birch, tree species native to eastern North America, sometimes used to produce oil of wintergreen
- Black birch, a common name for Betula nigra, also known as river birch, tree species native to the eastern United States
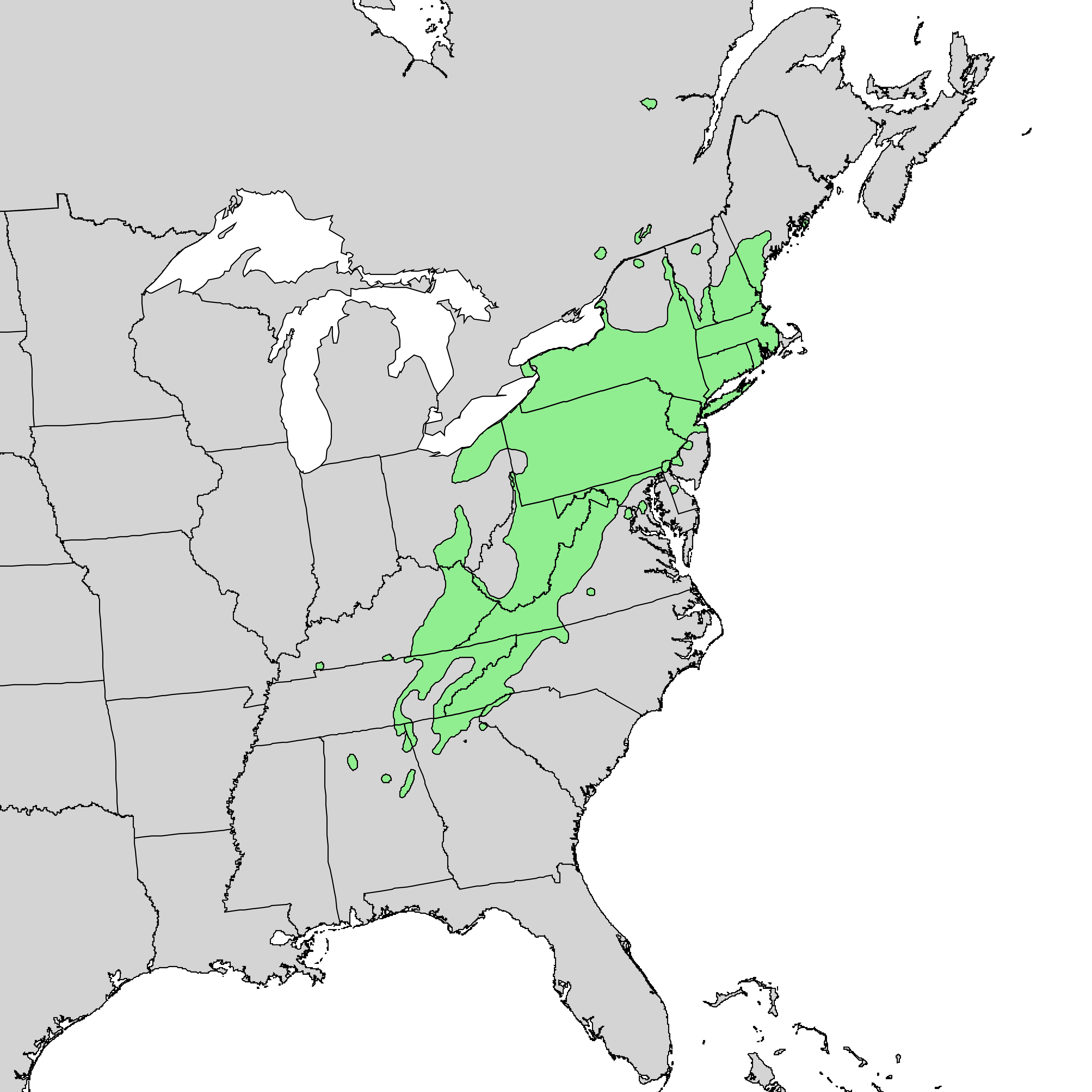
Betula lenta range map

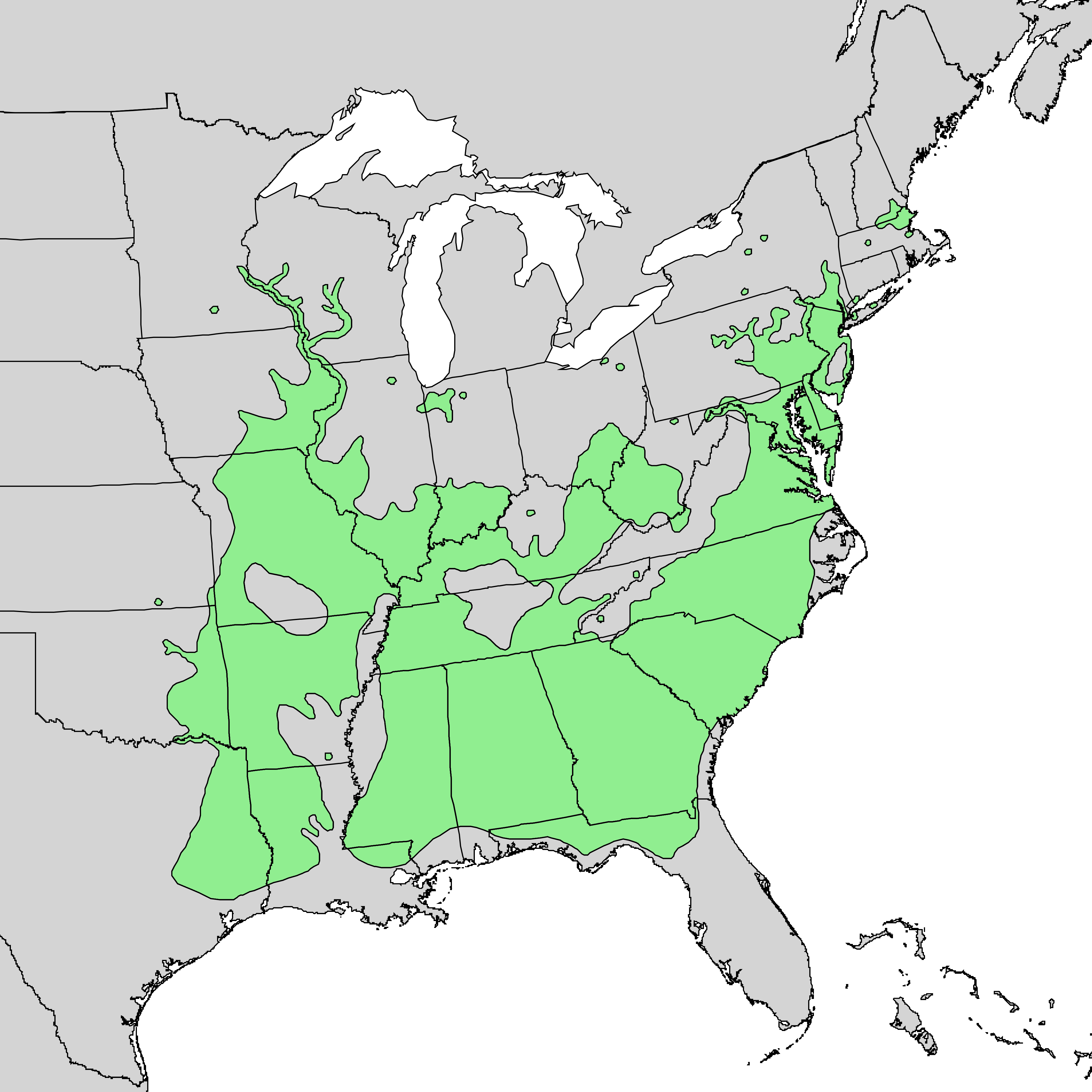
Betula nigra range map
