= Caloptilia pulverea =

Scientific classification
- Kingdom: Animalia
- Phylum: Arthropoda
- Class: Insecta
- Order: Lepidoptera
- Family: Gracillariidae
- Genus: Caloptilia
- Species: C. pulverea

Binomial name
- Caloptilia pulverea Kumata, 1966

Species of moth

Caloptilia pulverea is a moth of the family Gracillariidae. It is known from China, Japan (Honshū, Kyūshū, Shikoku, Hokkaidō) and the Russian Far East.

The wingspan is 12.5–14 mm.

The larvae feed on Alnus firma, Alnus hirsuta, Alnus japonica, Alnus matsumurae, Alnus maximowiczii, Alnus rugosa and Alnus serratuloides. They probably mine the leaves of their host plant.
