= Phyllonorycter maculata =

Scientific classification
- Kingdom: Animalia
- Phylum: Arthropoda
- Class: Insecta
- Order: Lepidoptera
- Family: Gracillariidae
- Genus: Phyllonorycter
- Species: P. maculata

Binomial name
- Phyllonorycter maculata (Kumata, 1963)

Synonyms
- Lithocolletis maculata Kumata, 1963

Species of moth

Phyllonorycter maculata is a moth of the family Gracillariidae. It is known from the islands of Hokkaidō and Honshū in Japan.

The wingspan is about 5.5 mm.

The larvae feed on Alnus hirsuta and Alnus matsumurae.
