= Stigmella glutinosae =

Scientific classification
- Kingdom: Animalia
- Phylum: Arthropoda
- Clade: Pancrustacea
- Class: Insecta
- Order: Lepidoptera
- Family: Nepticulidae
- Genus: Stigmella
- Species: S. glutinosae

Binomial name
- Stigmella glutinosae (Stainton, 1858)

Synonyms
- Nepticula glutinosae Stainton, 1858; Nepticula distinguenda Heinemann, 1862; Nepticula rubescens Heinemann, 1871

Species of moth

Stigmella glutinosae is a moth of the family Nepticulidae. It is found in all of Europe (except Iceland, Spain and the southern part of the Balkan Peninsula).

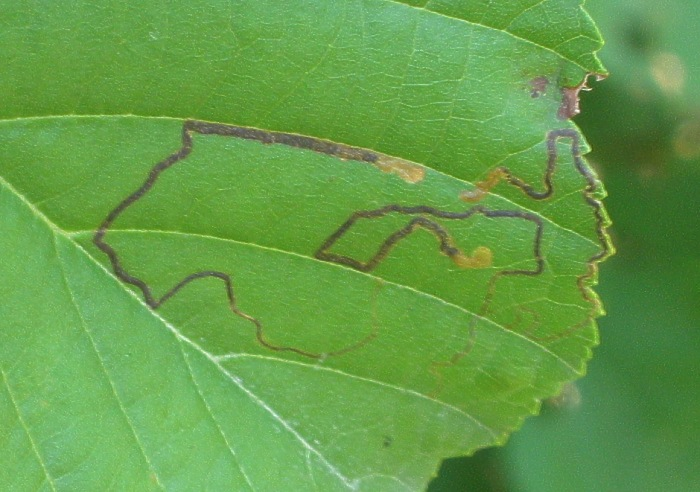
Damage

The wingspan is 4.4–5.2 millimetres (0.17–0.20 in).A small, dark bronze-coloured moth. The antennae are filamentous, dark and about half as long as the forewing. The innermost, greatly expanded joint is white. The head is yellow-haired, the body dark except for a white "collar" just behind the head. The forewings are glistening, dark bronze-brown with a rather narrow, silvery-white transverse band at about two-thirds of the wing. The hind wing is narrow, grey, with long fringes. The species is very similar to several other Stigmella species, but the white collar can be a good characteristic of this species.To be certain requires microscopic examination of the genitalia. Meyrick - The head is ochreous-yellowish or orange, collar yellow -whitish. Antennal eyecaps yellow whitish. Forewings bronze-fuscous, sometimes purplish-tinged a narrow whitish fascia beyond middle; apical area beyond this dark purplish-fuscous. Hindwings light grey.

Adults are on wing in May. There are two generations per year.

The larvae feed on Alnus glutinosa, Alnus cordata, Alnus incana, Alnus subcordata and Alnus viridis. They mine the leaves of their host plant.
