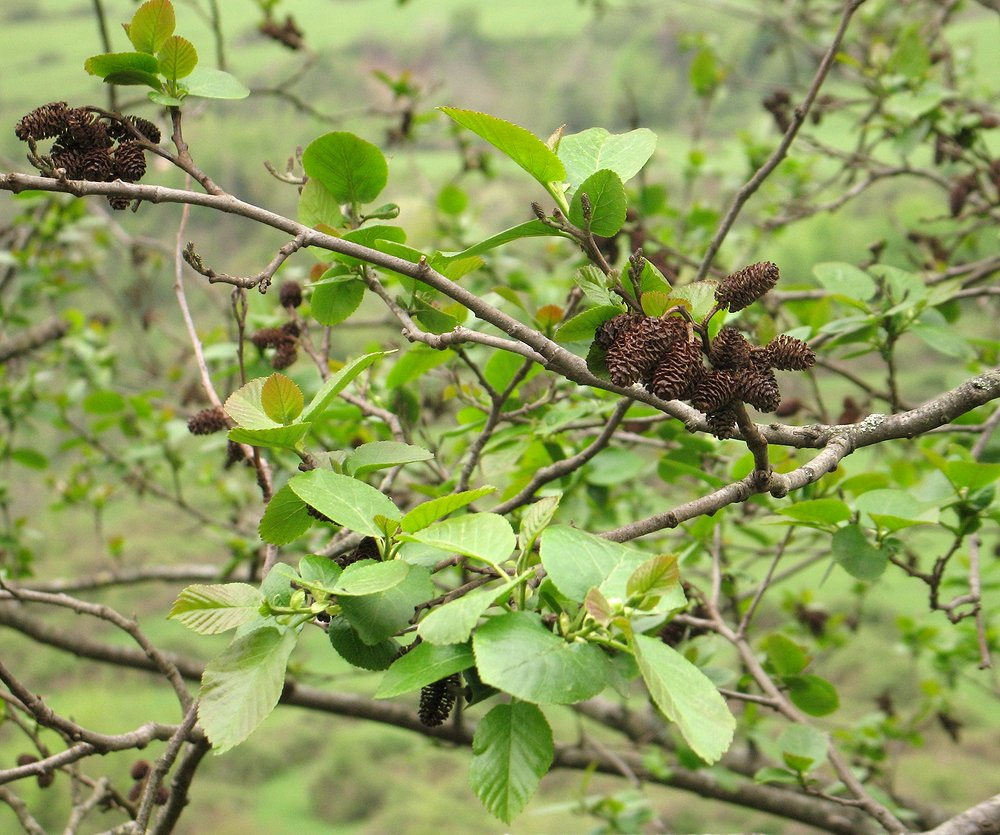
- In Azerbaijan

Conservation status
- Least Concern (IUCN 3.1)

Scientific classification
- Kingdom: Plantae
- Clade: Tracheophytes
- Clade: Angiosperms
- Clade: Eudicots
- Clade: Rosids
- Order: Fagales
- Family: Betulaceae
- Genus: Alnus
- Subgenus: Alnus subg. Alnus
- Species: A. subcordata

Binomial name
- Alnus subcordata C.A.Mey.

= Alnus subcordata =

Species of tree

Alnus subcordata, the Caucasian alder, is a species in the family Betulaceae, prevalent in the Hyrcanian woodlands situated in the Caspian Mountains of northern Iran and southeast Azerbaijan. It is closely related to the Italian alder (A. cordata) and Alnus orientalis.

It thrives across altitudes from sea level up to 2000 meters. This tree exhibits rapid growth in its natural habitat, predominantly river valleys. While it showcases adaptability to a diverse range of ecological conditions, it also demonstrates an ability to flourish in various growth habitats, particularly those at higher elevations.

It is a deciduous tree growing to 15–25 m tall, with similar glossy green cordate leaves 5–15 cm long. The flowers are catkins, the male catkins very slender, 8–15 cm long, the female catkins small, maturing into a woody cone-like fruit 2–3 cm long containing numerous small winged seeds.

Two varieties have been recorded:

- Alnus subcordata var. subcordata C.A. Mey.
- Alnus subcordata var. villosa (Regel) H.J.P.Winkl

== Uses ==
It is a commercially valuable species with "widespread application in timber and furniture industries". It has a calorific value of about 4,7 cal/g for wood and 4,5 cal/g for bark.
