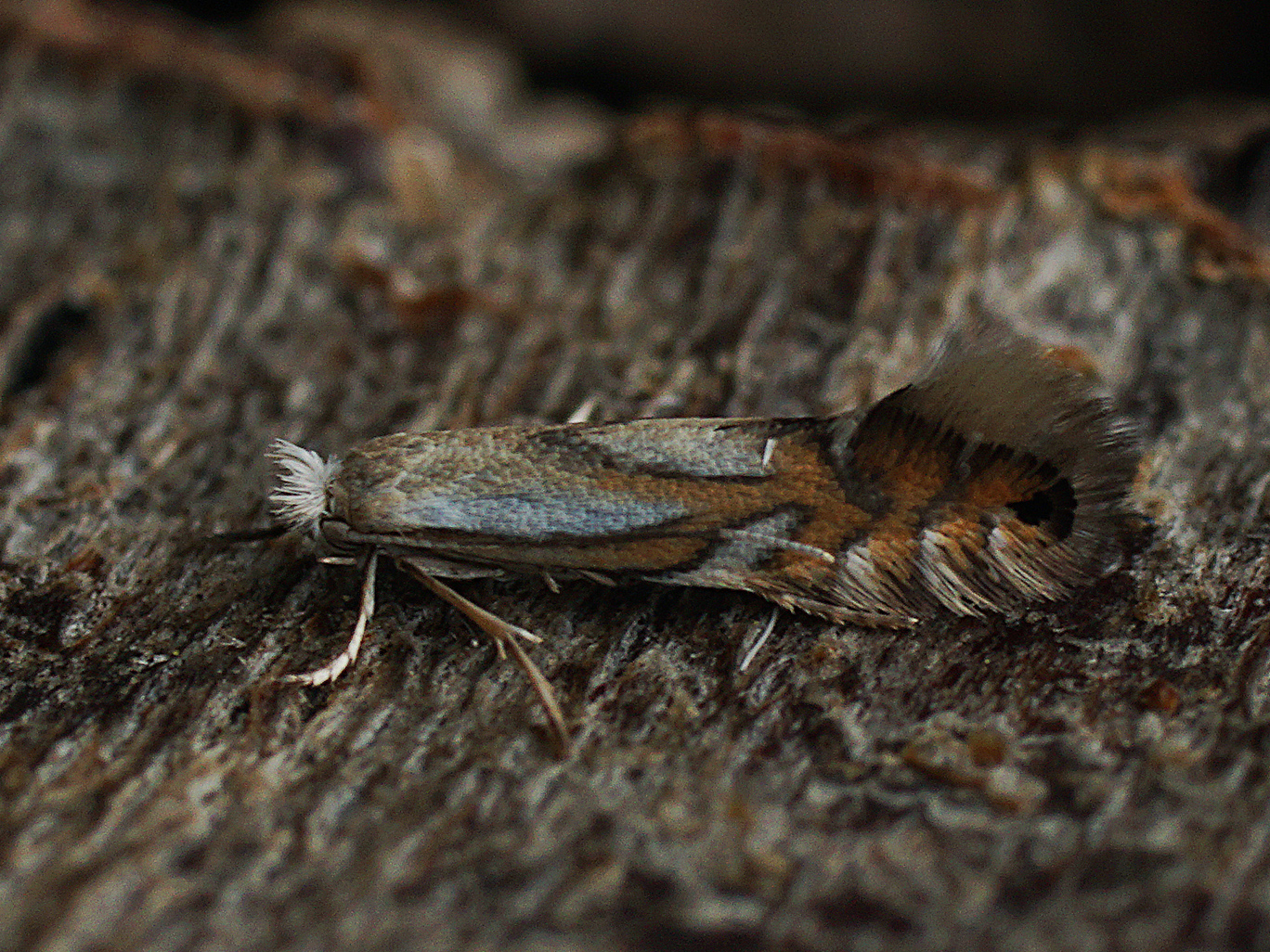
- Phyllonorycter rajella Moscow Oblast
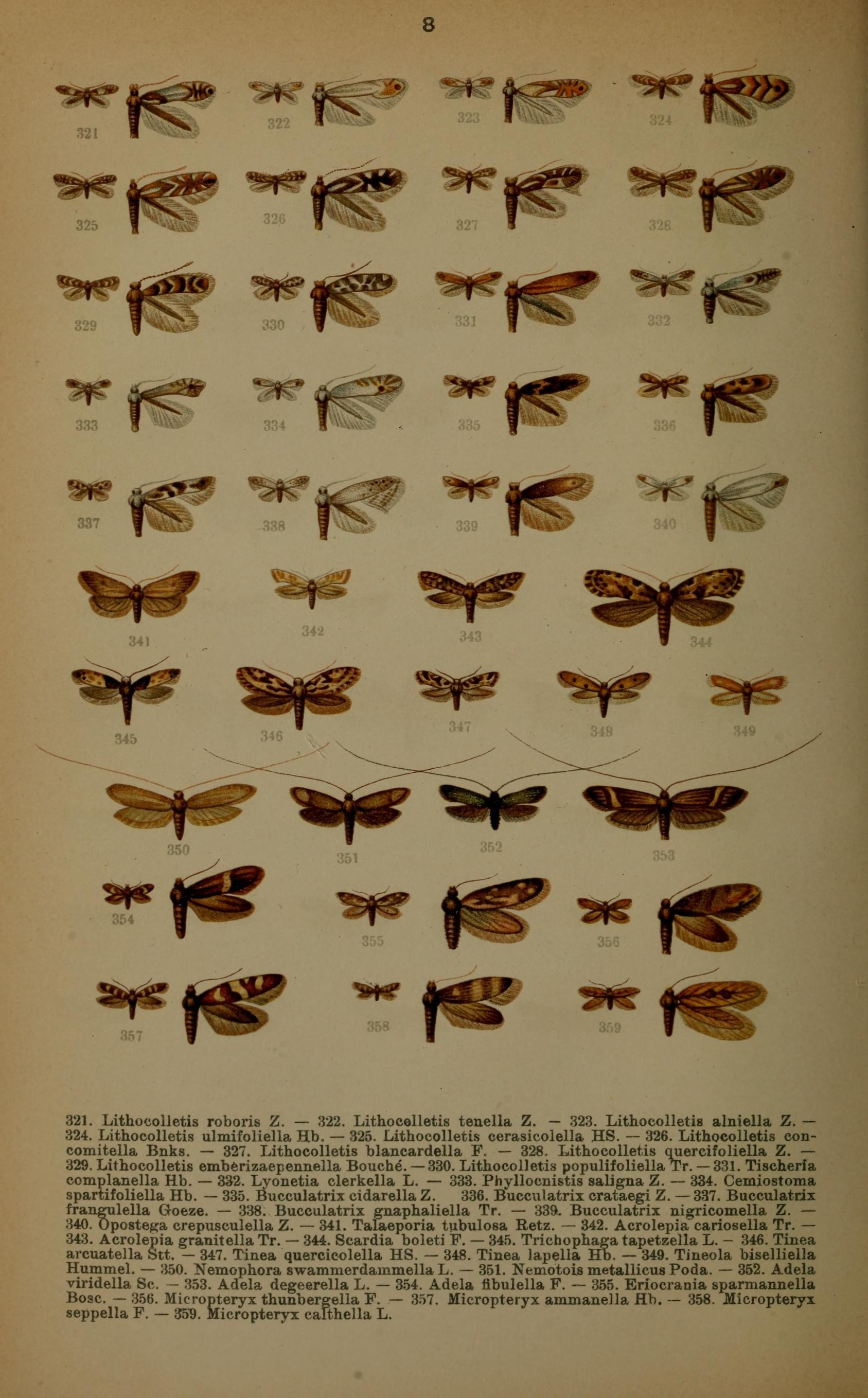

Scientific classification
- Kingdom: Animalia
- Phylum: Arthropoda
- Class: Insecta
- Order: Lepidoptera
- Family: Gracillariidae
- Genus: Phyllonorycter
- Species: P. rajella

Binomial name
- Phyllonorycter rajella (Linnaeus, 1758)

Synonyms
- Phalaena rajella Linnaeus, 1758; Tinea alnifoliella Hubner, 1796

= Phyllonorycter rajella =

Species of moth

Phyllonorycter rajella is a moth of the family Gracillariidae. It is known from all of Europe, except the Iberian Peninsula and Greece.

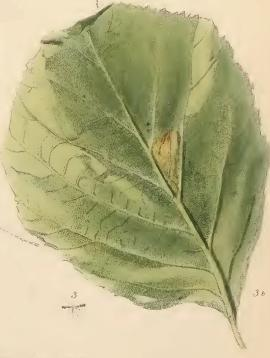
Mined alder leaf

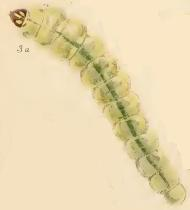
Larva

The wingspan is 7–9 mm. The forewings are fuscous or ochreous, in the female more whitish towards base; a pointed white median streak from base to middle, edged with dark fuscous above; four costal and three dorsal posterior shining white wedge-shaped spots, edged anteriorly and first costal posteriorly with dark fuscous, first dorsal broad, before first costal; a round black apical dot; an ill-defined dark hook in apical cilia. Hindwings are grey. The larva is greenish-white; dorsal line green; head pale brown

There are two generations per year with adults on wing in May and again in August.

The larvae feed on Alnus cordata, Alnus glutinosa, Alnus incana, Alnus oregona and Alnus viridis, mining the leaves of their host plant.
