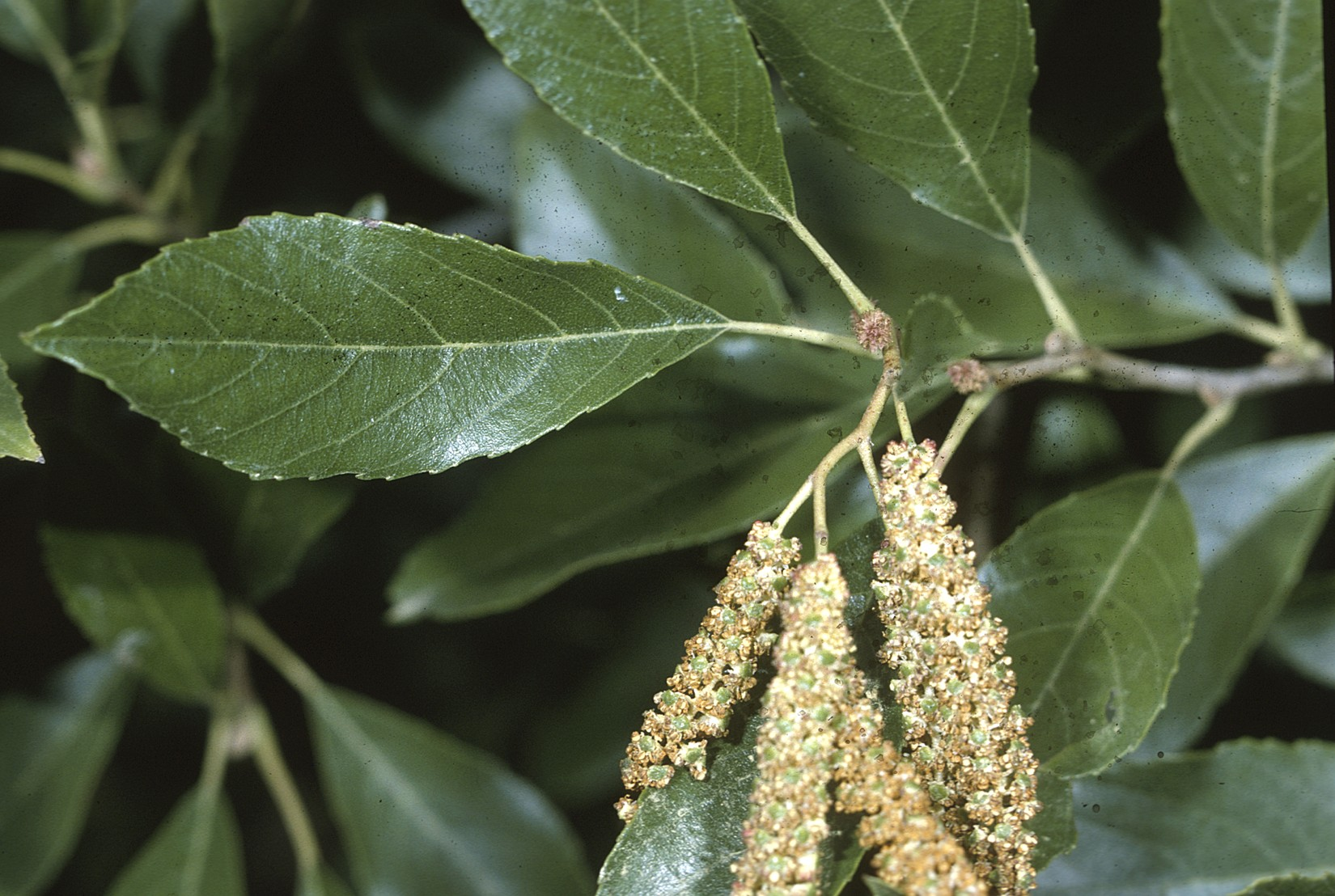
- Leaves and catkins

Conservation status
- Endangered (IUCN 3.1)

Scientific classification
- Kingdom: Plantae
- Clade: Embryophytes
- Clade: Tracheophytes
- Clade: Angiosperms
- Clade: Eudicots
- Clade: Rosids
- Order: Fagales
- Family: Betulaceae
- Genus: Alnus
- Subgenus: Alnus subg. Clethropsis
- Species: A. maritima

Binomial name
- Alnus maritima (Marshall) Muhl. ex Nutt.

Subspecies
- Alnus maritima subsp. georgiensis J.A.Schrad. & W.R.Graves; Alnus maritima subsp. maritima; Alnus maritima subsp. oklahomensis J.A.Schrad. & W.R.Graves
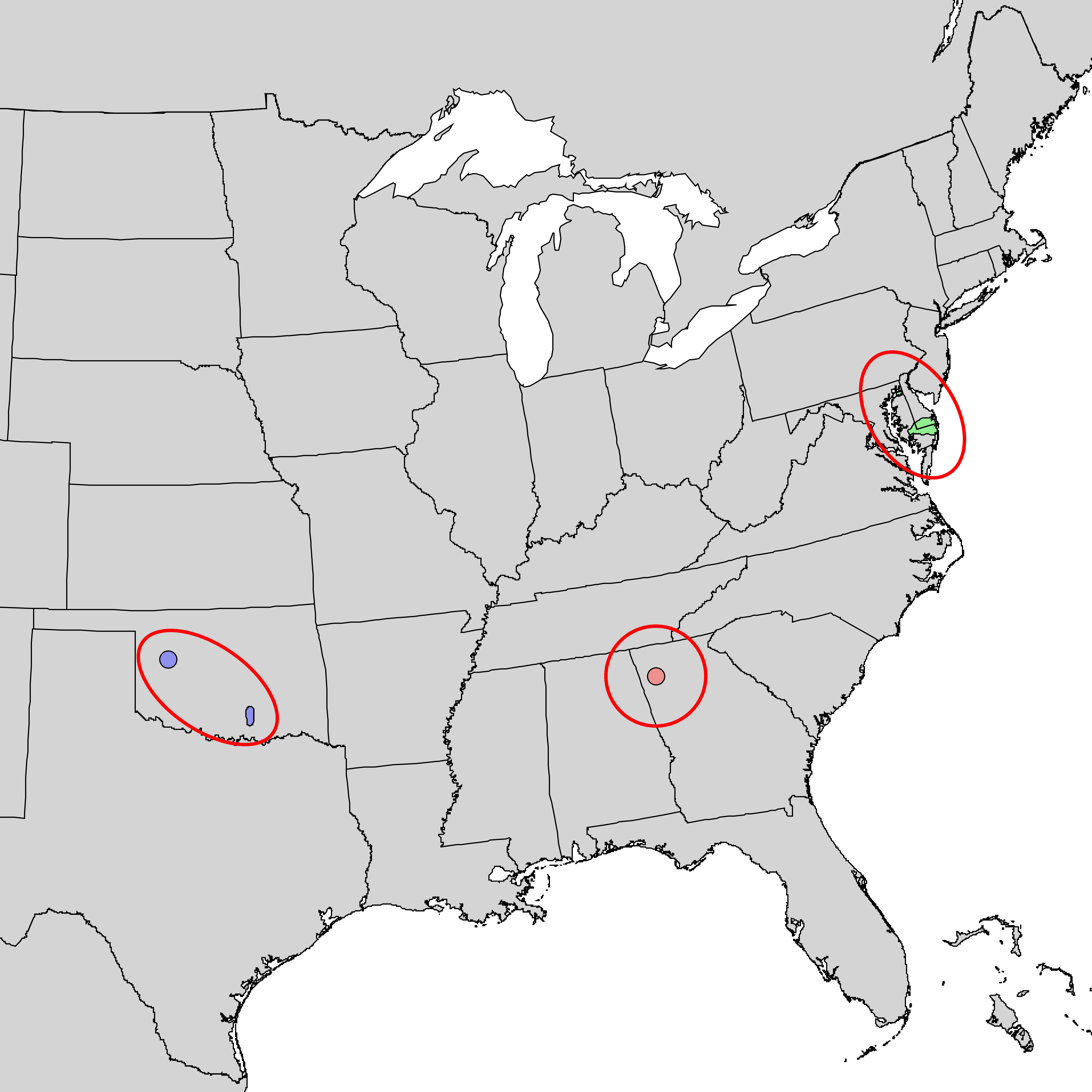
- Natural range of Alnus maritima

Synonyms
- Alnus maritima subsp. metoporina (Furlow) A.E.Murray, not validly publ.; Alnus maritima var. metoporina (Furlow) A.E.Murray, not validly publ.; Alnus metoporina Furlow, nom. illeg. superfl.; Betula-alnus maritima Marshall

= Alnus maritima =

Species of plant

Alnus maritima ( also known as the seaside alder, delmarva alder, or brook alder) is a species of shrub or small tree in the family Betulaceae. Alnus maritima is endemic to the United States, and is found naturally in three disjunct populations in Oklahoma, Georgia, and in Maryland and Delaware on the Delmarva Peninsula.

Alnus maritima is the only autumn-blooming member of the genus Alnus native to North America. All other North American alders bloom in the spring. The autumn-blooming phenology is a characteristic that Alnus maritima shares with two old-world Alnus species, Alnus nitida and Alnus nepalensis, which are endemic to southeast Asia. This profound similarity in their timing of anthesis has led to their classification as the only three members in the subgenus Clethropsis.

== Taxonomy ==
In 2002, the three populations were recognized as subspecies and given the names Alnus maritima subsp. oklahomensis, Alnus maritima subsp. georgiensis, and Alnus maritima subsp. maritima, respectively. While some believe that subspecies maritima is the oldest of the three subspecies and that the other two disjunct populations resulted from some form of long distance dispersal, evidence from morphometric and phylogeographic studies indicates that the Oklahoma population (subsp. oklahomensis) is in fact the most ancestral and that the species probably had a wide, continuous distribution across the United States in the past.
