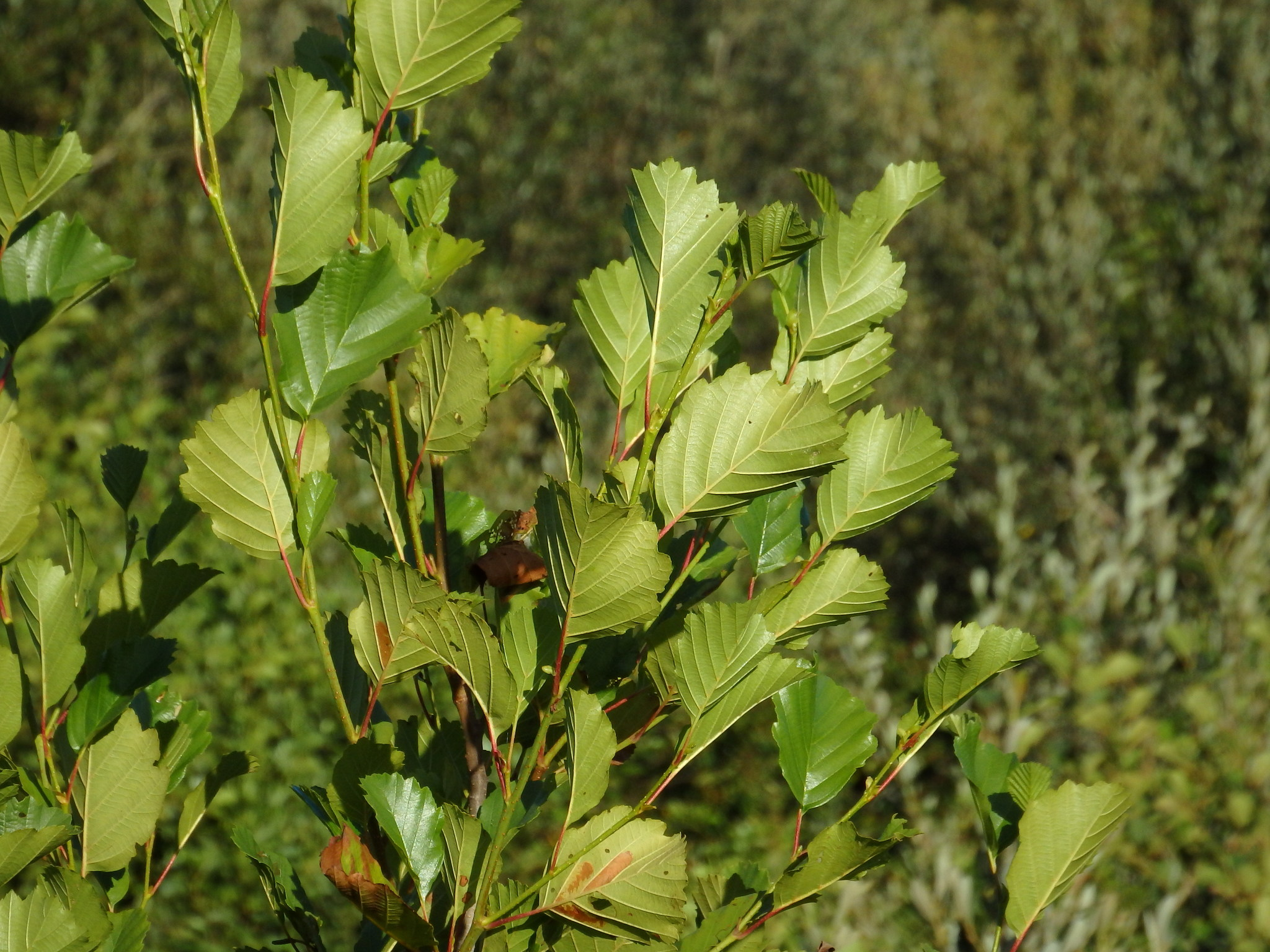
- The Iberian alder native to Portugal and Spain

Conservation status
- Data Deficient (IUCN 3.1)

Scientific classification
- Kingdom: Plantae
- Clade: Tracheophytes
- Clade: Angiosperms
- Clade: Eudicots
- Clade: Rosids
- Order: Fagales
- Family: Betulaceae
- Genus: Alnus
- Species: A. lusitanica

Binomial name
- Alnus lusitanica Vít, Douda & Mandák

= Alnus lusitanica =

Species of plant

Alnus lusitanica, dubbed the Iberian alder, is a species of flowering plant in the family Betulaceae, native to Portugal and Spain.

A tree of riparian and other wet habitats, it is a tetraploid related to the diploid common alder (Alnus glutinosa).
