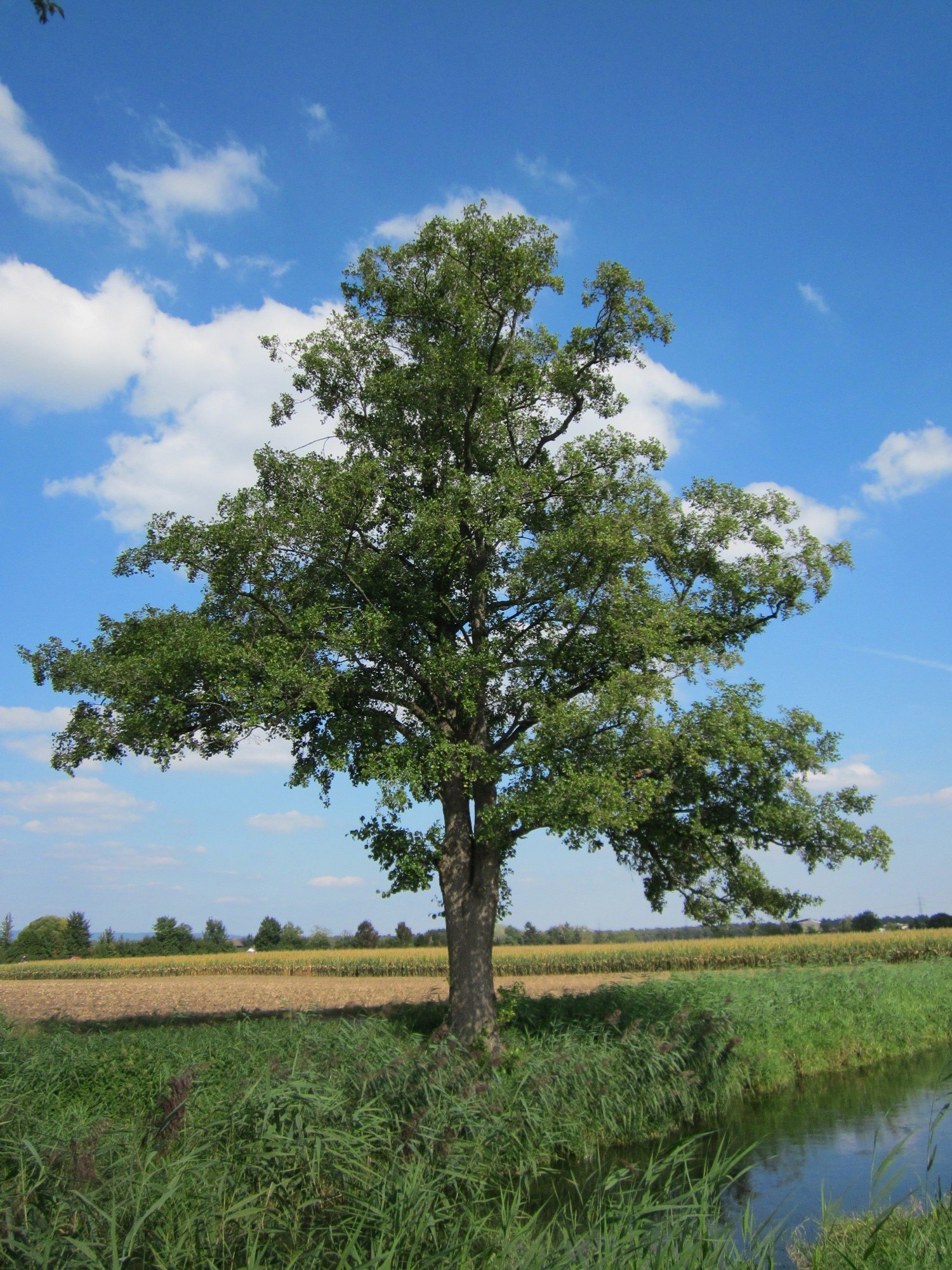
- Common alder (Alnus glutinosa)

Scientific classification
- Kingdom: Plantae
- Clade: Tracheophytes
- Clade: Angiosperms
- Clade: Eudicots
- Clade: Rosids
- Order: Fagales
- Family: Betulaceae
- Subfamily: Betuloideae
- Genus: Alnus; Mill.

Type species
- Alnus glutinosa (L.) Gaertn.

Synonyms
- Genus synonyms: Betula-alnus Marshall; Duschekia Opiz; Alnaster Spach; Clethropsis Spach; Semidopsis Zumagl.; Alnobetula (W.D.J.Koch) Schur.; Cremastogyne (H.J.P.Winkl.) Czerep.

= Alder =

Alder Temporal range: Paleocene–Recent

Genus of flowering plants in the birch family

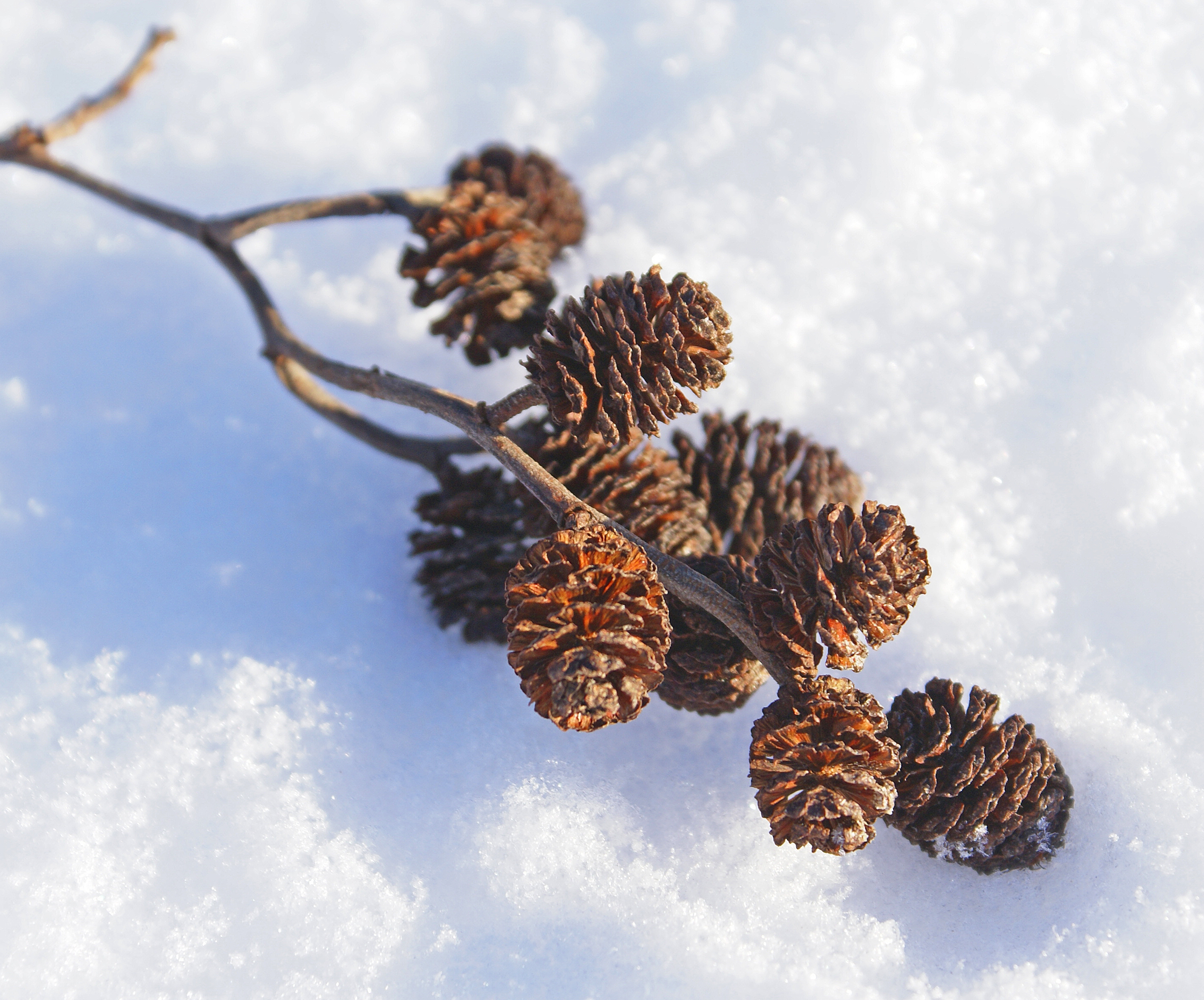
Female alder catkins after shedding their seeds

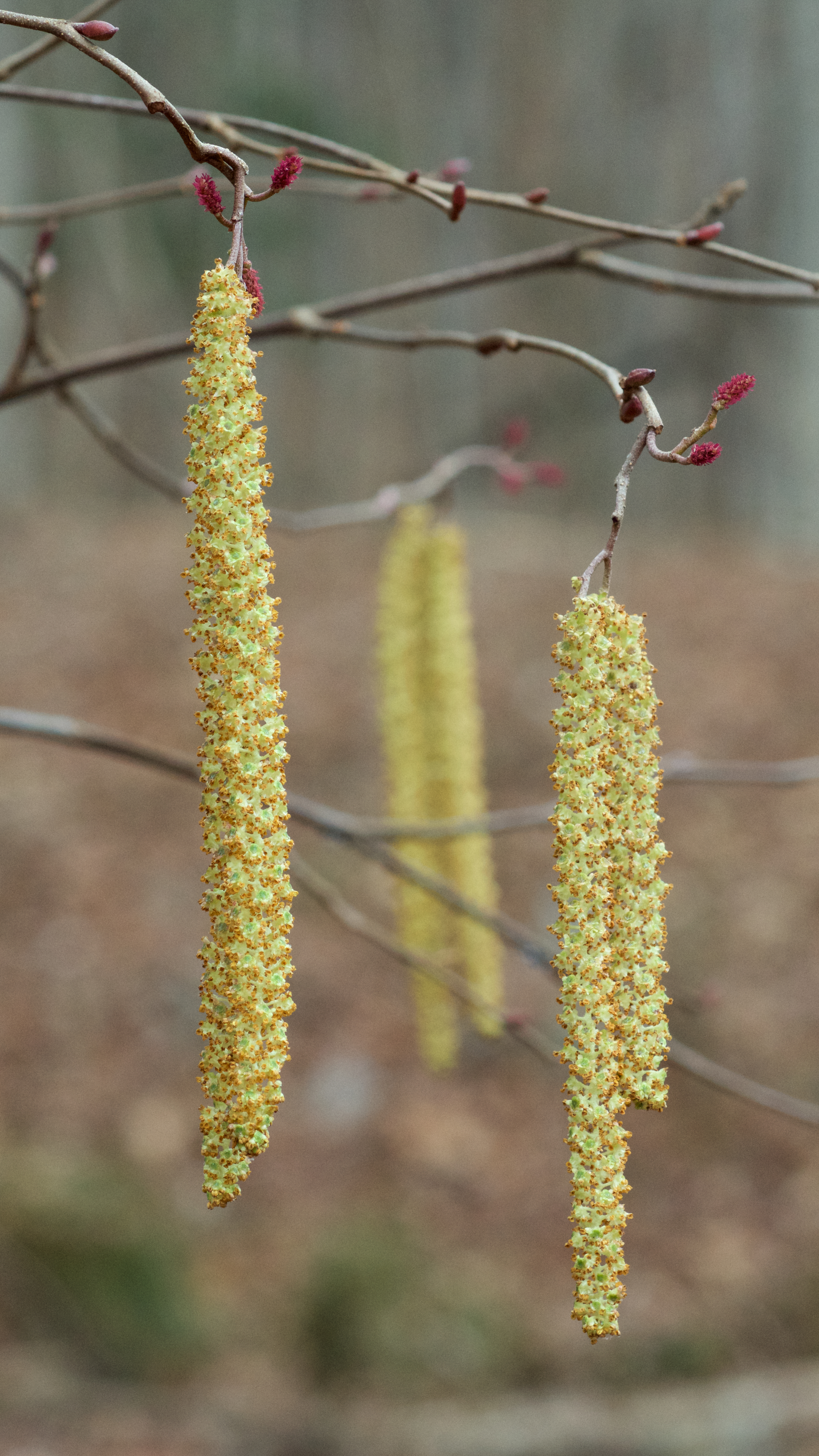
Alnus serrulata male catkins

Alders are trees of the genus Alnus in the birch family Betulaceae. The genus includes about 35 species of monoecious trees and shrubs, a few reaching a large size, distributed throughout the north temperate zone with a few species extending into Central America, as well as the northern and southern Andes.

== Description ==
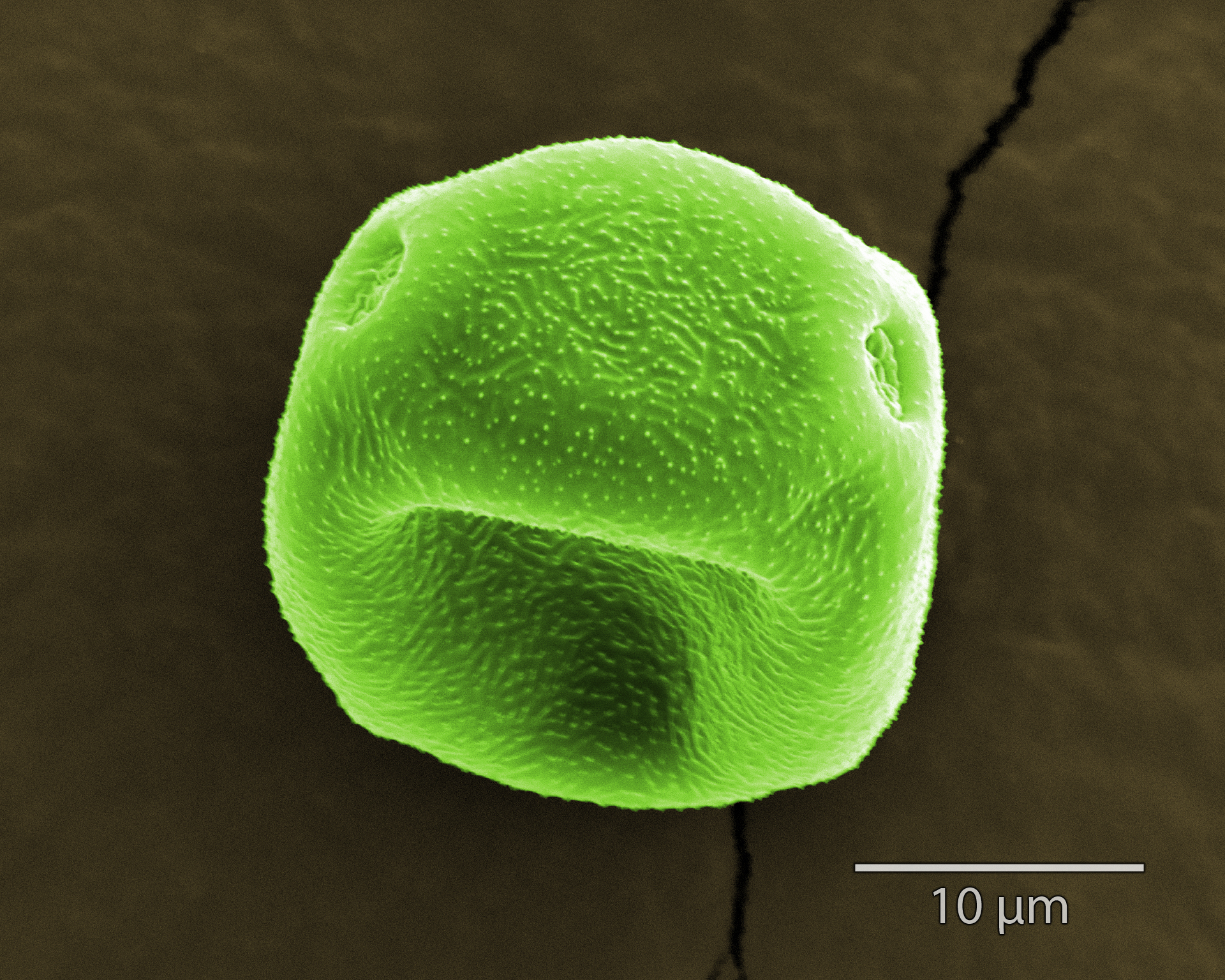
Pollen

With a few exceptions, alders are deciduous, and the leaves are alternate, simple, and serrated. The flowers are catkins with elongate male catkins on the same plant as shorter female catkins, often before leaves appear; they are mainly wind-pollinated, but also visited by bees to a small extent. These trees differ from the birches (Betula, another genus in the family) in that the female catkins are woody and do not disintegrate at maturity, opening to release the seeds in a similar manner to many conifer cones.

The largest species are red alder (A. rubra) on the west coast of North America, and black alder (A. glutinosa), native to most of Europe and widely introduced elsewhere, both reaching over 30 metres (100 ft). By contrast, the widespread Alnus alnobetula (green alder) is rarely more than a 5 m-tall (16 ft) shrub.

== Etymology ==
The common name alder evolved from the Old English word alor, which in turn is derived from Proto-Germanic root aliso. The generic name Alnus is the equivalent Latin name, from whence French aulne and Spanish Alamo (Spanish term for "poplar").

== Ecology ==
Alders are commonly found near streams, rivers, and wetlands. Sometimes where the prevalence of alders is particularly prominent these are called alder carrs. In the Pacific Northwest of North America, the white alder (Alnus rhombifolia) unlike other northwest alders, has an affinity for warm, dry climates, where it grows along watercourses, such as along the lower Columbia River east of the Cascades and the Snake River, including Hells Canyon.

Alder leaves and sometimes catkins are used as food by numerous butterflies and moths.

A. glutinosa and A. viridis are classed as environmental weeds in New Zealand. Alder leaves and especially the roots are important to the ecosystem because they enrich the soil with nitrogen and other nutrients.

=== Nitrogen fixation and succession of woodland species ===
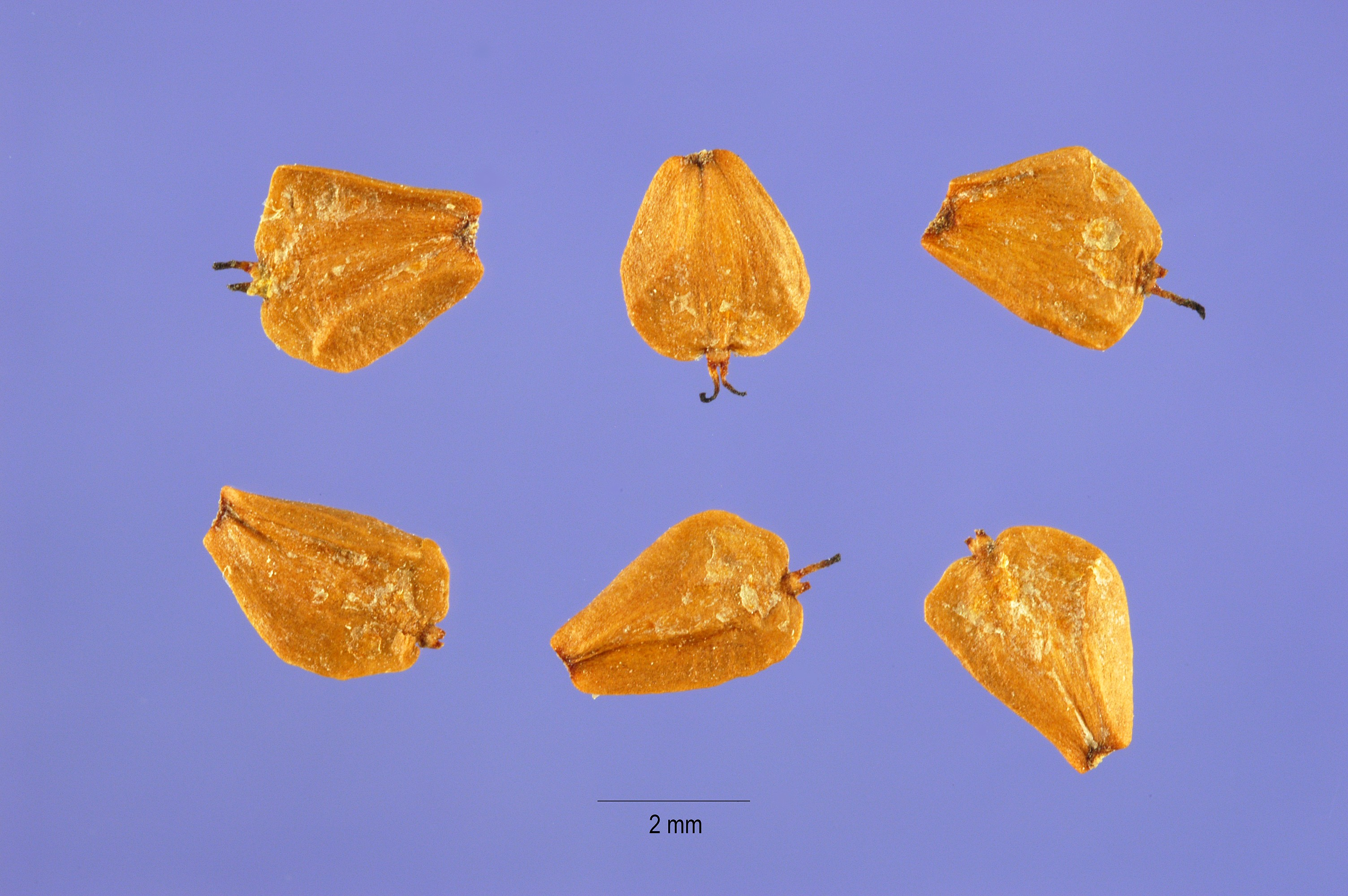
A red alder seed is a tiny samara like those of all alders.

Alder is particularly noted for its important symbiotic relationship with Frankia alni, an actinomycete, filamentous, nitrogen-fixing bacterium. This bacterium is found in root nodules, which may be as large as a human fist, with many small lobes, and light brown in colour. The bacterium absorbs nitrogen from the air and makes it available to the tree. Alder, in turn, provides the bacterium with sugars, which it produces through photosynthesis. As a result of this mutually beneficial relationship, alder improves the fertility of the soil where it grows, and as a pioneer species, it helps provide additional nitrogen for the successional species to follow.

Because of its abundance, red alder delivers large amounts of nitrogen to enrich forest soils. Red alder stands have been found to supply between 130 and 320 kilograms per hectare (120 and 290 pounds per acre) of nitrogen annually to the soil. From Alaska to Oregon, Alnus viridis subsp. sinuata (A. sinuata, Sitka alder or slide alder), characteristically pioneer fresh, gravelly sites at the foot of retreating glaciers. Studies show that Sitka alder, a more shrubby variety of alder, adds nitrogen to the soil at an average rate of 60 kg/ha (54 lb/acre) per year, helping convert the sterile glacial terrain to soil capable of supporting a conifer forest. Alders are common among the first species to colonize disturbed areas from floods, windstorms, fires, landslides, etc. Alder groves often serve as natural firebreaks since these broad-leaved trees are much less flammable than conifers. Their foliage and leaf litter does not carry a fire well, and their thin bark is sufficiently resistant to protect them from light surface fires. In addition, the light weight of alder seeds – numbering 1.5 million per kilogram or 680,000 per pound – allows for easy dispersal by the wind. Although it outgrows coastal Douglas-fir for the first 25 years, it is very shade intolerant and seldom lives more than 100 years. Red alder is the Pacific Northwest's largest alder and the most plentiful and commercially important broad-leaved tree in the coastal Northwest. Groves of red alder 25 to 50 centimetres (10 to 20 in) in diameter intermingle with young Douglas-fir forests west of the Cascades, attaining a maximum height of 30 to 33 m (100 to 110 ft) in about sixty years, and then are afflicted by heart rot. Alders largely help create conditions favorable for giant conifers that replace them.

Alder root nodules

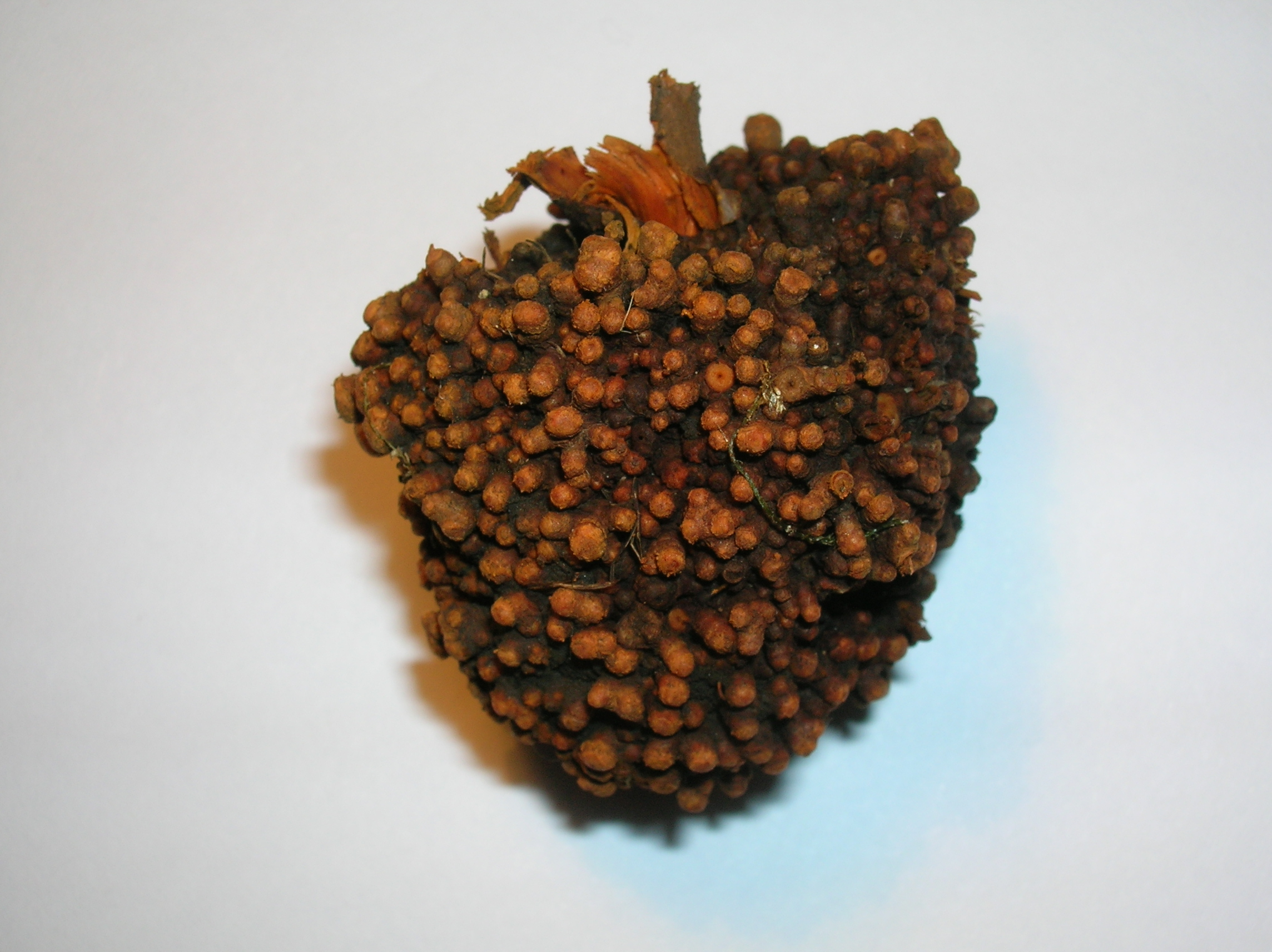
Whole root nodule

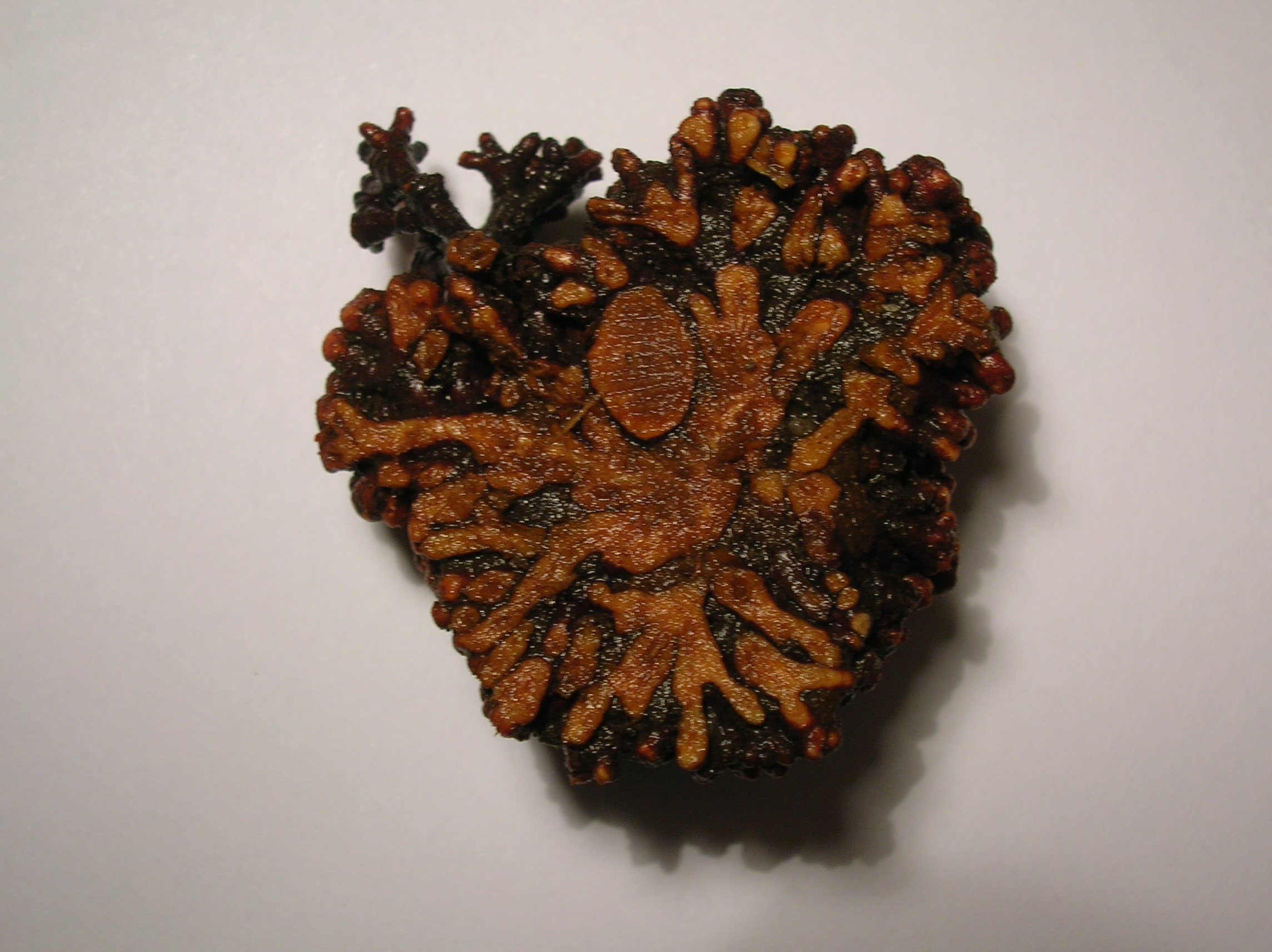
Sectioned root nodules

=== Parasites ===
Alder roots are parasitized by northern groundcone.

== Uses ==
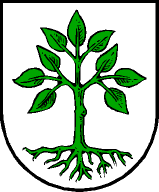
Alder coat of arms of Grossarl, Austria

The catkins of some alder species have a degree of edibility, and may be rich in protein. Reported to have a bitter and unpleasant taste, they are more useful for survival purposes. The wood of certain alder species is often used to smoke various food items such as coffee, salmon, and other seafood.

Alder is notably stable when immersed, and has been used for millennia as a material for pilings for piers and wharves. Most of the pilings that form the foundation of Venice were made from alder trees.

Alder bark contains the anti-inflammatory salicin, which is metabolized into salicylic acid in the body. Some Native American cultures use red alder bark (Alnus rubra) to treat poison oak, insect bites, and skin irritations. Blackfeet Indians have traditionally used an infusion made from the bark of red alder to treat lymphatic disorders and tuberculosis. Recent clinical studies have verified that red alder contains betulin and lupeol, compounds shown to be effective against a variety of tumors.

The inner bark of the alder, as well as red osier dogwood, or chokecherry, is used by some Indigenous peoples of the Americas in smoking mixtures, known as kinnikinnick, to improve the taste of the bearberry leaf.

Alder is illustrated in the coat of arms for the Austrian town of Grossarl.

Electric guitars, most notably those manufactured by the Fender Musical Instruments Corporation, have been built with alder bodies since the 1950s. Alder is appreciated for its tone that is claimed to be tight and evenly balanced, especially when compared to mahogany, and has been adopted by many electric guitar manufacturers. It usually is finished in opaque lacquer (nitrocellulose, polyurethane, or polyester), as it does not have a prominent grain.

As a hardwood, alder is used in making furniture, cabinets, and other woodworking products. In these applications, its aforementioned lack of prominent grain means that it is often veneered, either by stained light woods such as oak, ash, or figured maple, or by darker woods such as teak or walnut.

Alder bark and wood (like oak and sweet chestnut) contain tannin and are traditionally used to tan leather.

A red dye can also be extracted from the outer bark, and a yellow dye from the inner bark.

== Culture ==
Ermanno Olmi's movie The Tree of Wooden Clogs (L' Albero Degli Zoccoli, 1978) refers in its title to alder, typically used to make clogs as in this movie's plot.

== Classification ==
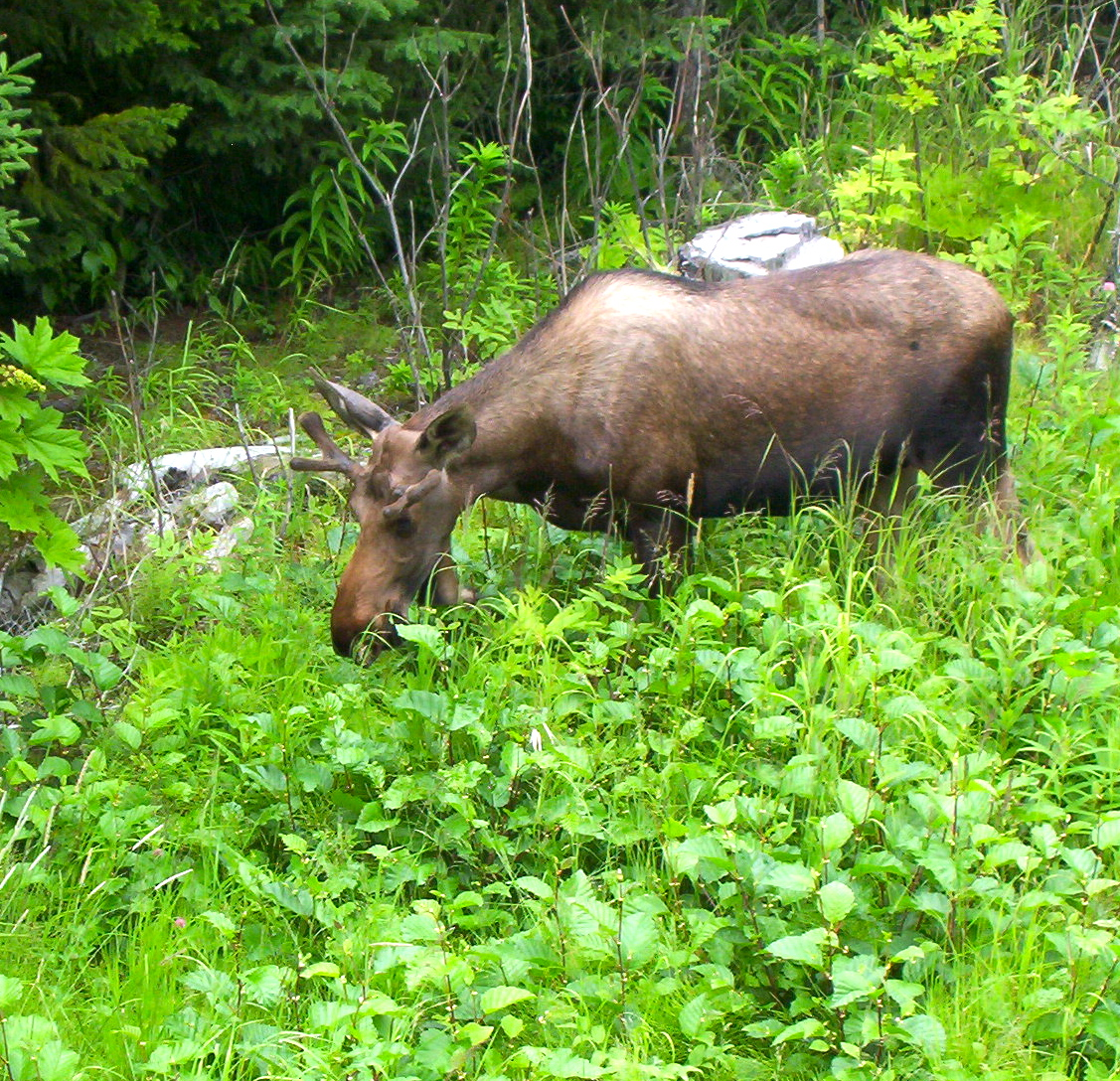
A young bull moose browsing on Alnus in Homer, Alaska, in 2010

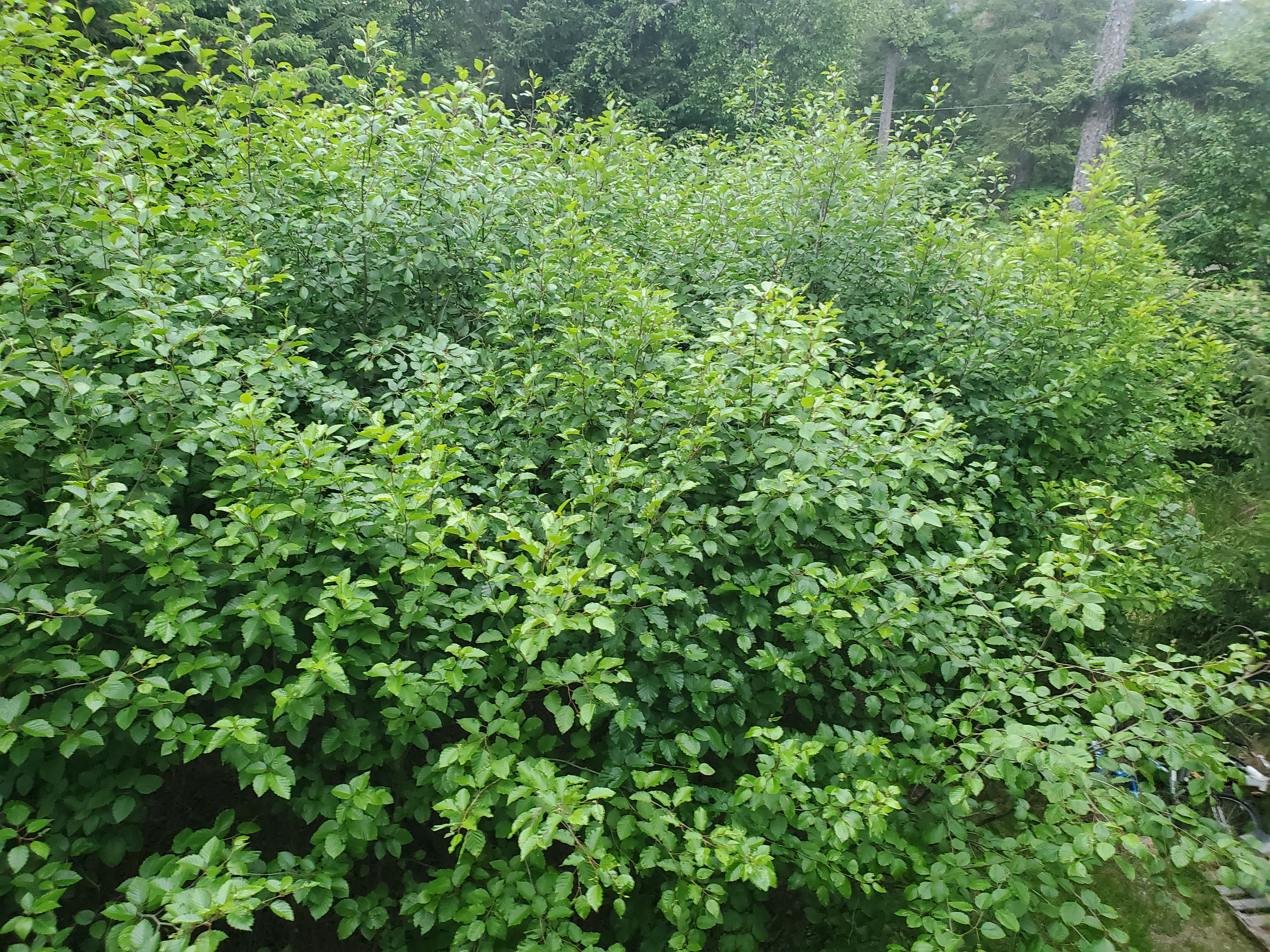
The same spot from the same angle in 2021; the plants are now about 3.7–4.6 metres (12–15 ft) in height.

The genus is divided into three subgenera:

=== Subgenus Alnus ===
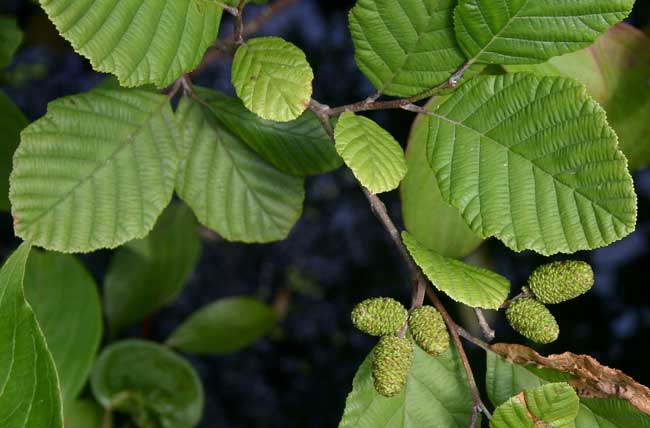
Speckled alder (Alnus incana subsp. rugosa)—leaves

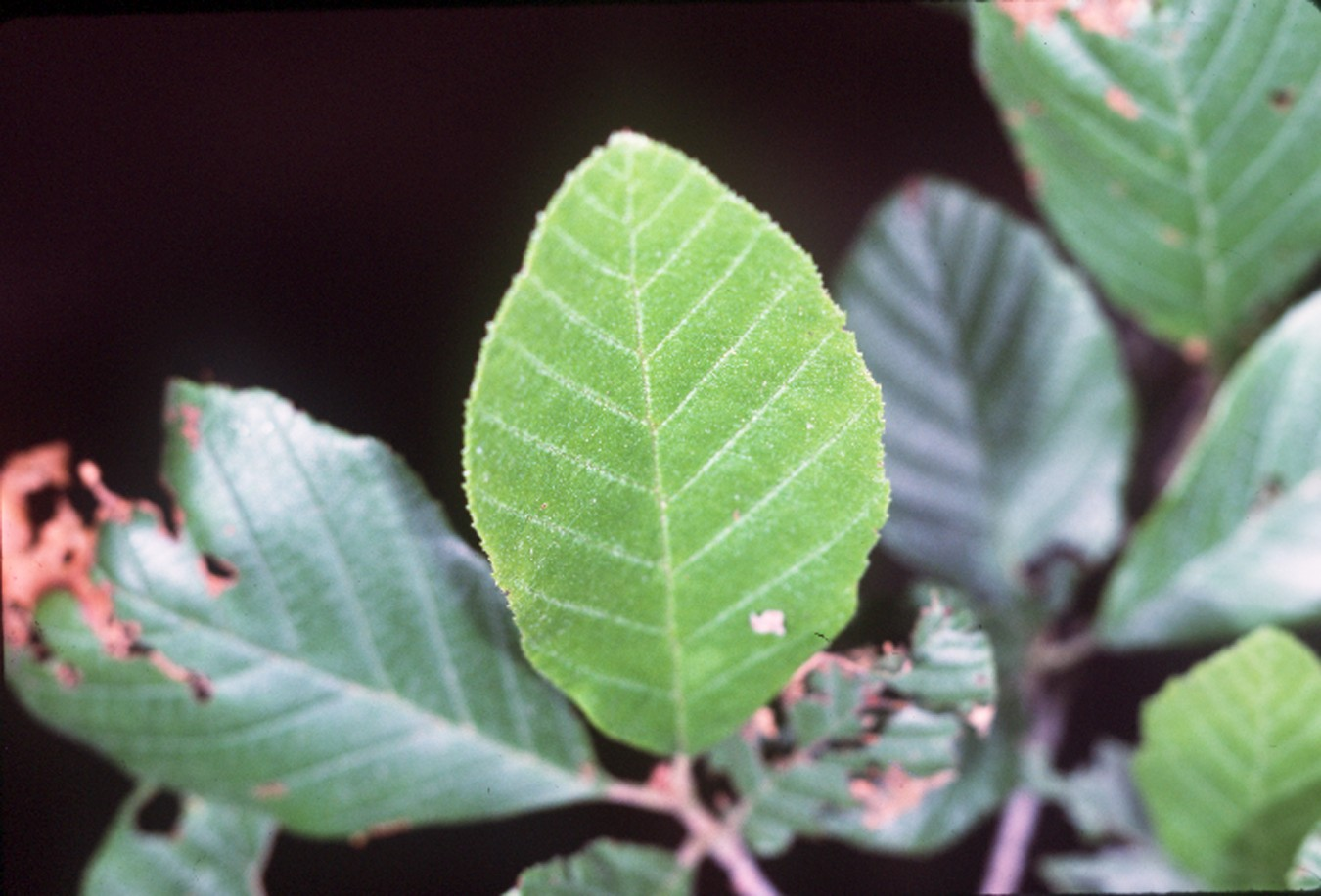
Leaves of the tag alder

Trees with stalked shoot buds, male and female catkins produced in autumn (fall) but stay closed over winter, pollinating in late winter or early spring, about 15–25 species, including:

- Alnus acuminata Kunth
  - subsp. acuminata Kunth
  - subsp. arguta (Schltdl.) Furlow
  - subsp. glabrata (Fernald) Furlow
- Alnus cordata (Loisel.) Duby
- Alnus cremastogyne Burkill
- Alnus firma Siebold & Zucc.
- Alnus glutinosa (L.) Gaertn.
  - subsp. barbata (C.A.Mey.) Yalt.
  - subsp. glutinosa (L.) Gaertn.
  - subsp. incisa (Willd.) Regel
  - subsp. laciniata (Willd.) Regel
- Alnus hirsuta (Spach) Rupr.
- Alnus incana (L.) Moench
  - subsp. incana (L.) Moench
  - subsp. kolaensis (Orlova) Á.Löve & D.Löve
  - subsp. rugosa (Du Roi) R.T.Clausen
  - subsp. tenuifolia (Nutt.) Breitung
- Alnus japonica (Thunb.) Steud.
- Alnus jorullensis Kunth
  - subsp. lutea Furlow
  - subsp. jorullensis Kunth
- Alnus lusitanica Vít, Douda, & Mandák
- Alnus matsumurae Callier
- Alnus nepalensis D.Don
- Alnus oblongifolia Torr.
- Alnus orientalis Decne.
- Alnus rhombifolia Nutt.
- Alnus rohlenae Vít, Douda, & Mandák
- Alnus rubra Bong.
- Alnus serrulata (Aiton) Willd.
- Alnus subcordata C.A.Mey.
- Alnus tenuifolia Nutt.
- Alnus trabeculosa Hand.-Mazz.

=== Subgenus Clethropsis ===
Trees or shrubs with stalked shoot buds, male and female catkins produced in autumn (fall) and expanding and pollinating then, three species:

- Alnus formosana (Burkill) Makino
- Alnus maritima (Marshall) Muhl. ex Nutt.
- Alnus nitida (Spach) Endl.

=== Subgenus Alnobetula ===
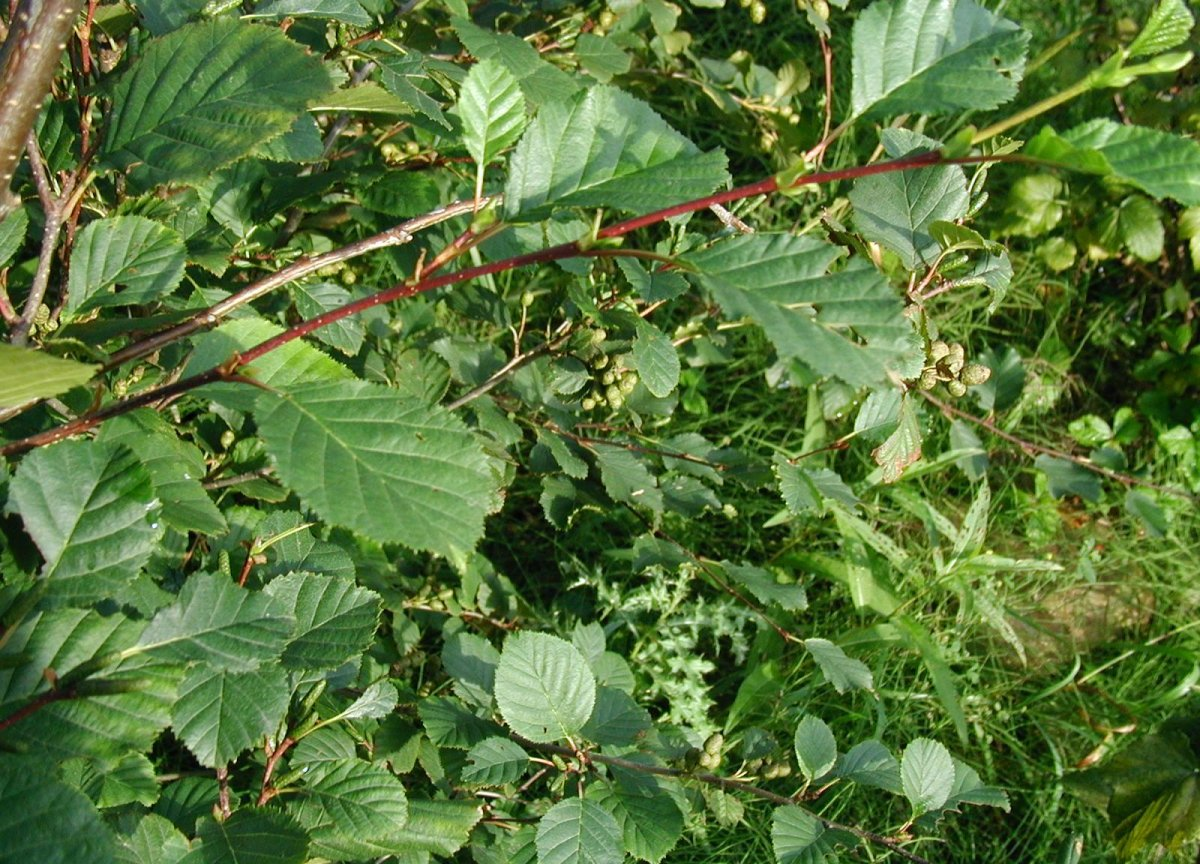
Green alder (Alnus viridis)

Shrubs with shoot buds not stalked, male and female catkins produced in late spring (after leaves appear) and expanding and pollinating then, one to four species:

- Alnus alnobetula (Ehrh.) K.Koch (synonym-Alnus viridis)
  - subsp. alnobetula (Ehrh.) K.Koch
  - subsp. crispa (Aiton) Raus
  - subsp. fruticosa (Rupr.) Raus
  - subsp. sinuata (Regel) Raus
  - subsp. suaveolens (Req.) Lambinon & Kerguélen
- Alnus firma Siebold & Zucc.
- Alnus mandshurica (Callier) Hand.-Mazz.
- Alnus maximowiczii Callier
- Alnus pendula Matsum.
- Alnus sieboldiana Matsum.

=== Not assigned to a subgenus ===
- Alnus fauriei H.Lév. & Vaniot
- Alnus ferdinandi-coburgii C.K.Schneid.
- Alnus glutipes (Jarm. ex Czerpek) Vorosch.
- Alnus hakkodensis Hayashi
- Alnus henryi C.K.Schneid.
- Alnus lanata Duthie ex Bean
- Alnus mairei H.Lév.
- Alnus paniculata Nakai
- Alnus serrulatoides Callier
- Alnus vermicularis Nakai

=== Species names with uncertain taxonomic status ===
The status of the following species is unresolved:

- Alnus balatonialis Borbás
- Alnus cuneata Geyer ex Walp.
- Alnus dimitrovii Jordanov & Kitanov
- Alnus djavanshirii H.Zare – Iran
- Alnus dolichocarpa H.Zare, Amini & Assadi – Iran
- Alnus figerti Callier
- Alnus frangula L. ex Huth
- Alnus gigantea Nakai
- Alnus glandulosa Sarg.
- Alnus henedae Sugim.
- Alnus hybrida Rchb.
- Alnus laciniata Ehrh.
- Alnus lobata Nyman
- Alnus microphylla Arv.-Touv.
- Alnus obtusifolia Mert. ex Regel
- Alnus oxyacantha Lavalle
- Alnus subrotunda Desf.
- Alnus vilmoriana Lebas
- Alnus washingtonia Wetzel

=== Hybrids ===
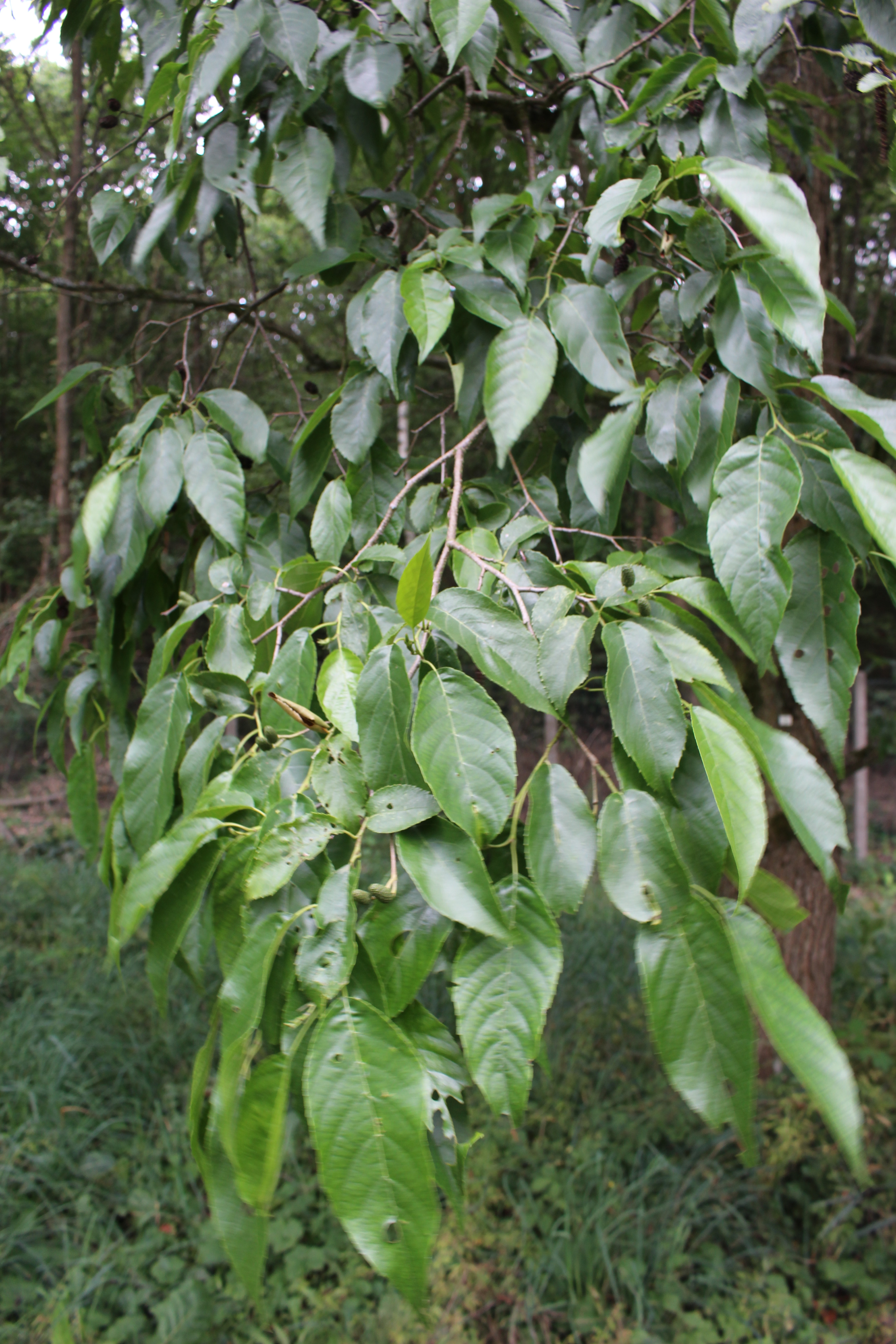
Alnus × spaethii

The following hybrids have been described:

- Alnus × elliptica Req. (A. cordata × A. glutinosa)
- Alnus × fallacina Callier (A. incana subsp. rugosa × A. serrulata)
- Alnus × hanedae Suyinata (A. firma × A. sieboldiana)
- Alnus × hosoii Mizush. (A. maximowiczii × A. pendula)
- Alnus × mayrii Callier (A. hirsuta × A. japonica)
- Alnus × peculiaris Hiyama (A. firma × A. pendula)
- Alnus × pubescens Tausch. (A. glutinosa × A. incana)
- Alnus × suginoi Sugim. (A. hirsuta × A. serrulatoides)

The status of the following hybrids is unresolved:

- Alnus × aschersoniana Callier
- Alnus × koehnei Callier
- Alnus × ljungeri Murai
- Alnus × purpusii Callier
- Alnus × silesiaca Fiek
- Alnus × spaethii Callier (A. japonica × A. subcordata)

=== Fossil record ===
The oldest fossil pollen that can be identified as Alnus is from northern Bohemia, dating to the late Paleocene, around 58 million years ago.

- †Alnus fairi (Knowlton) Wolfe - Miocene; Western North America
- †Alnus heterodonta (Newberry) Meyer & Manchester – Oligocene; Fossil, Oregon
- †Alnus hollandiana Jennings - Miocene; Western North America
- †Alnus largei (Knowlton) Wolfe - Miocene; Western North America
- †Alnus parvifolia (Berry) Wolfe & Wehr - Ypresian; Okanagan Highlands
- †Alnus relatus (Knowlton) Brown - Miocene; Western North America
