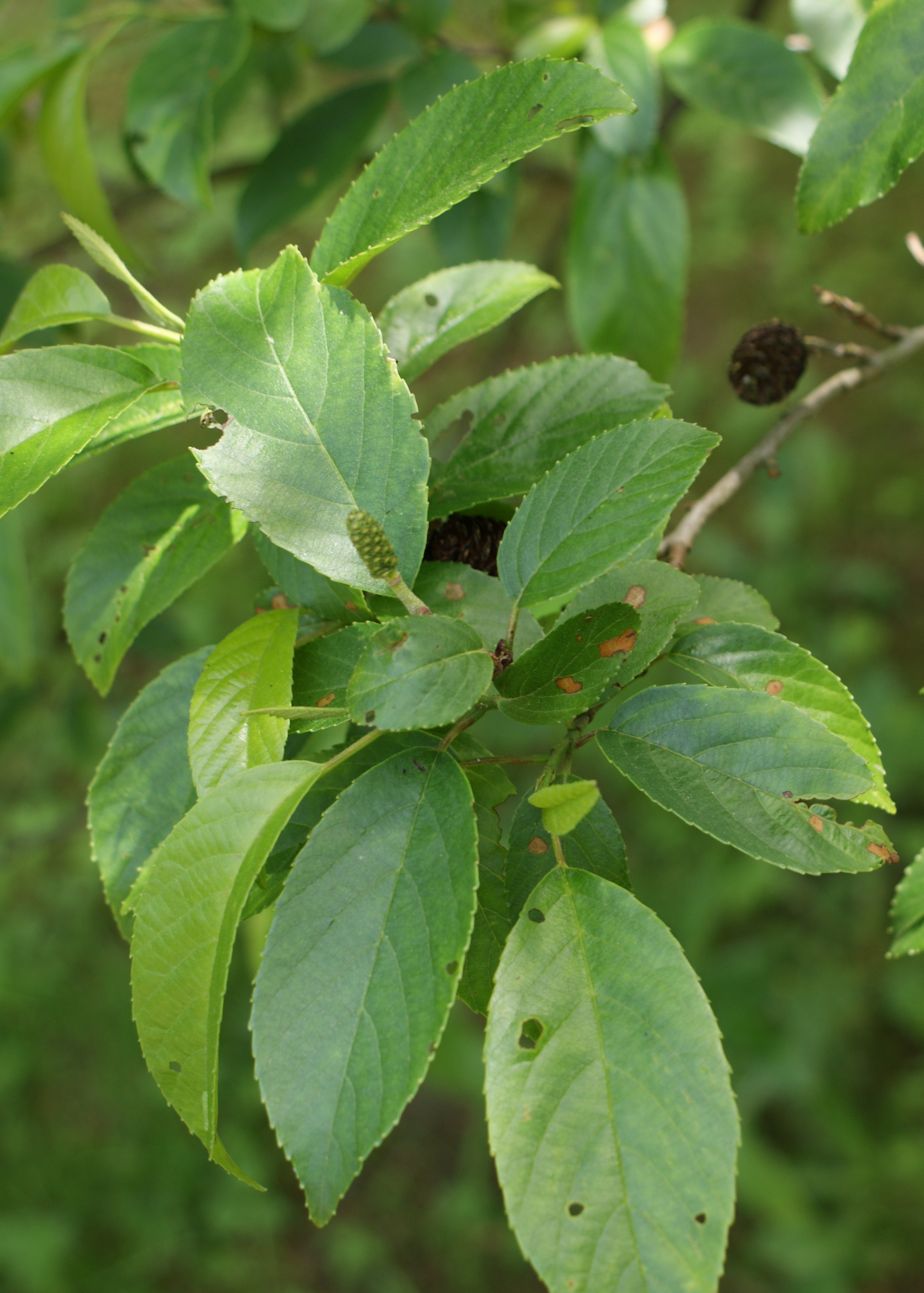

Conservation status
- Least Concern (IUCN 3.1)

Scientific classification
- Kingdom: Plantae
- Clade: Embryophytes
- Clade: Tracheophytes
- Clade: Angiosperms
- Clade: Eudicots
- Clade: Rosids
- Order: Fagales
- Family: Betulaceae
- Genus: Alnus
- Subgenus: Alnus subg. Alnus
- Species: A. cremastogyne

Binomial name
- Alnus cremastogyne Burkill

Synonyms
- Cremastogyne longipes Czerep.

= Alnus cremastogyne =

Species of flowering plant

Alnus cremastogyne is a species of flowering plant in the genus Alnus. It is a tree endemic to central and southern China, where it grows in Sichuan, southeastern Gansu, northern Guizhou, southern Shaanxi, and Zhejiang provinces. It is a large, fast-growing tree that can reach up to 40 metres in height. It grows in mountain and stream side forests from 500 to 3,000 metres elevation, where it prefers warm and sunny sites.

The deciduous tree Alnus cremastogyne grows quickly and is remarkably good at fixing nitrogen. Beyond its ability to produce wood and its ecological relevance, it is valuable since it is one of the preferred intercropping species that is well accepted for its ability to improve soil. Furthermore, it often acts as a pioneer species, especially in regions impacted by occurrences like the landslides caused by the Wenchuan earthquake. These days, A. cremastogyne is grown in many different places, such as Sichuan's Kangding, Zhoushan, Zhejiang, Northeast Yunnan, and the southern slope of the Qinling Mountains. Provinces including Sichuan, Guizhou, Shaanxi, Gansu, and the middle and lower Yangtze River regions are included in this extension. The average annual temperature in these regions is between 15 and 18 °C (59 and 64 °F), while the average annual precipitation is between 900 and 1,500 mm (35 and 59 in).
