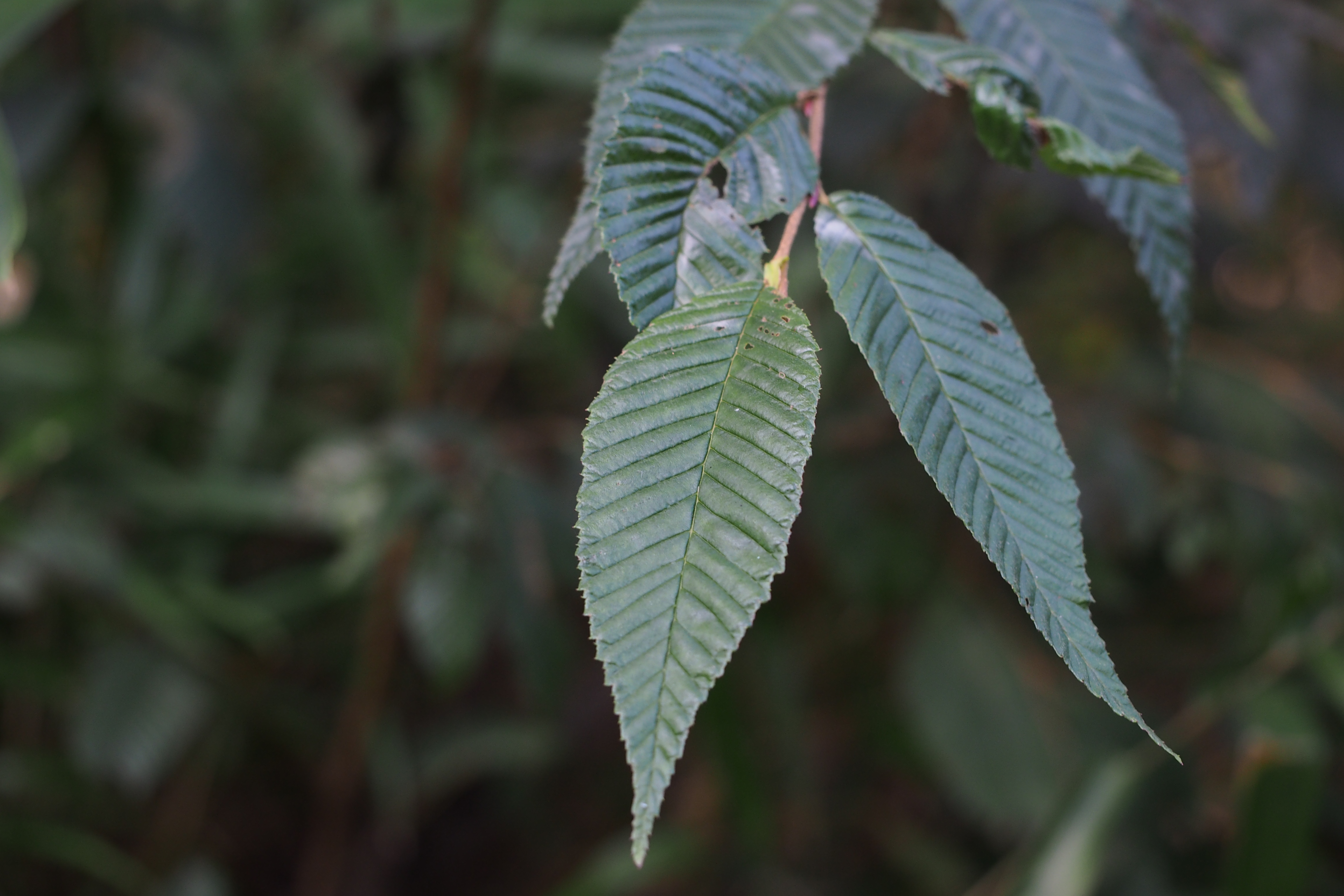
- Leaves
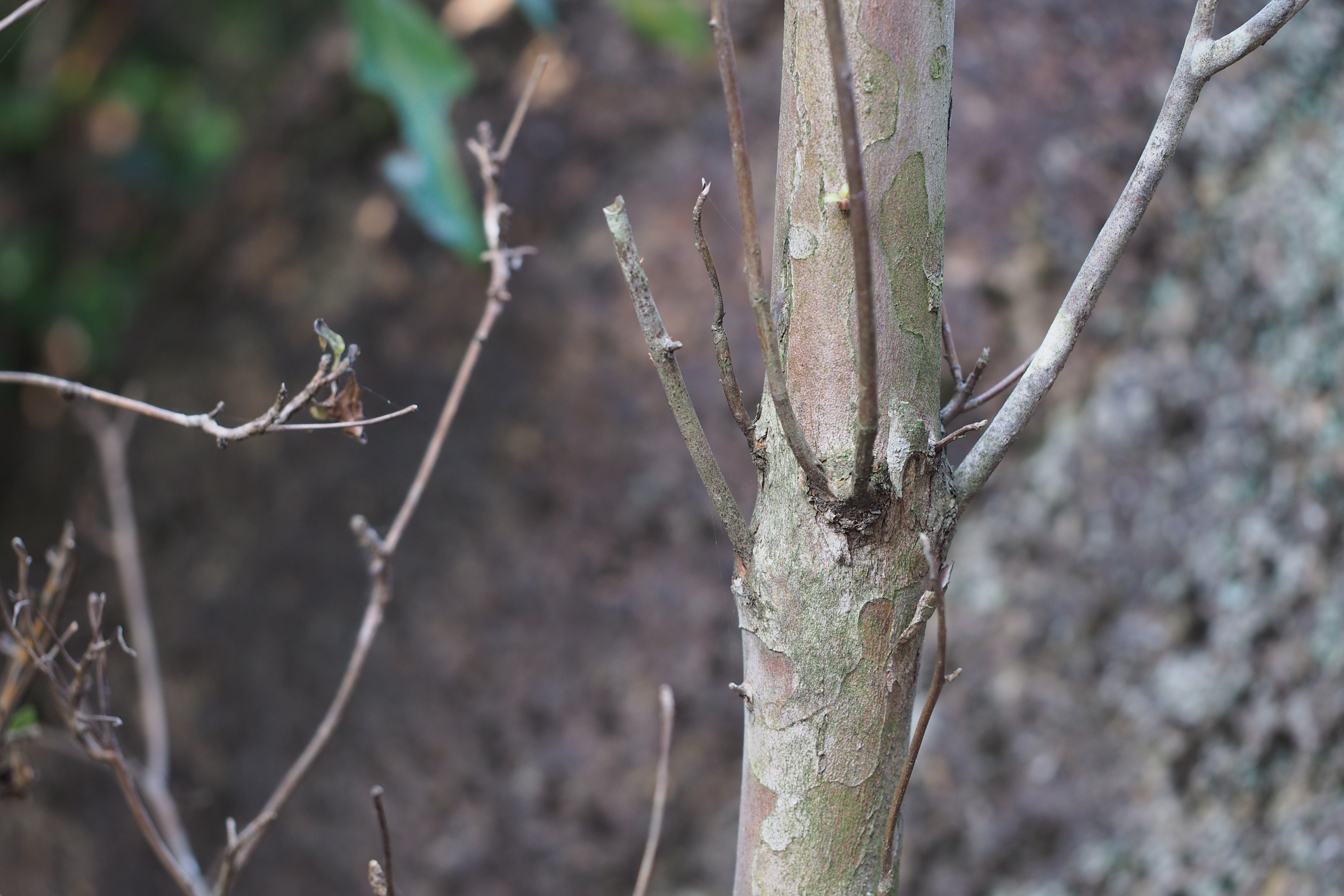
- Bark

Conservation status
- Least Concern (IUCN 3.1)

Scientific classification
- Kingdom: Plantae
- Clade: Embryophytes
- Clade: Tracheophytes
- Clade: Angiosperms
- Clade: Eudicots
- Clade: Rosids
- Order: Fagales
- Family: Betulaceae
- Genus: Alnus
- Species: A. pendula

Binomial name
- Alnus pendula Matsum.

Synonyms
- Alnaster pendulus (Matsum.) Murai; Alnus firma var. multinervis Regel; Alnus multinervis (Regel) Callier; Alnus multinervis var. nikkoensis Callier; Duschekia pendula (Matsum.) Holub

= Alnus pendula =

Species of plant

Alnus pendula is a species of flowering plant in the alder genus Alnus (family Betulaceae), native to Honshu and Hokkaido islands of Japan. An "exceptionally attractive" and "extremely elegant" large shrub or small tree, sources differ on whether it is introduced or native to Korea.
