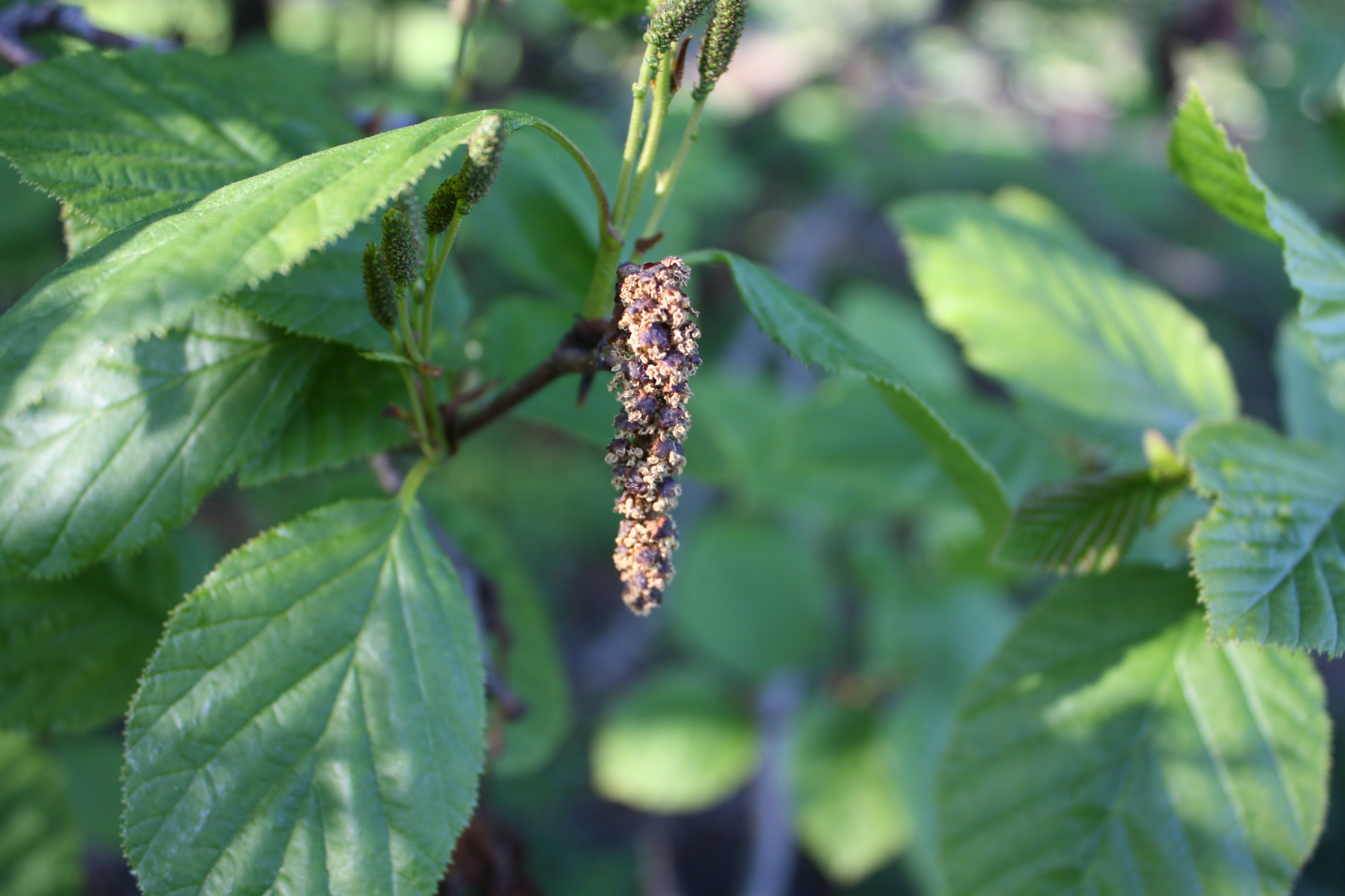

Conservation status
- Least Concern (IUCN 3.1)

Scientific classification
- Kingdom: Plantae
- Clade: Embryophytes
- Clade: Tracheophytes
- Clade: Angiosperms
- Clade: Eudicots
- Clade: Rosids
- Order: Fagales
- Family: Betulaceae
- Genus: Alnus
- Species: A. mandshurica

Binomial name
- Alnus mandshurica (Callier) Hand.-Mazz.

Synonyms
- Synonymy: Alnus alnobetula subsp. mandschurica (Callier) Chery; Alnus fruticosa f. barbinervis Nakai; Alnus fruticosa f. grandifolia Callier; Alnus fruticosa var. mandschurica Callier; Alnus fruticosa var. manschurica Callier ex Kom., orth. var.; Alnus fruticosa var. pubescens Nakai; Alnus fruticosa f. pubescens (Nakai) T.B.Lee; Alnus fruticosa var. rufinervis Nakai; Alnus fruticosa f. rufinervis (Nakai) T.B.Lee; Alnus fruticosa var. sachalinensis Koidz.; Alnus mandschurica f. barbinervis (Nakai) W.Lee; Alnus mandschurica var. pubescens A.I.Baranov; Alnus mandschurica f. pubescens (Nakai) Kitag.; Alnus mandschurica var. pubescens (Nakai) A.I.Baranov; Duschekia mandschurica (Callier) Pouzar

= Alnus mandshurica =

Species of flowering plant

Alnus mandshurica is a species of alder (Alnus) tree native to northern China and the southern Russian Far East.
