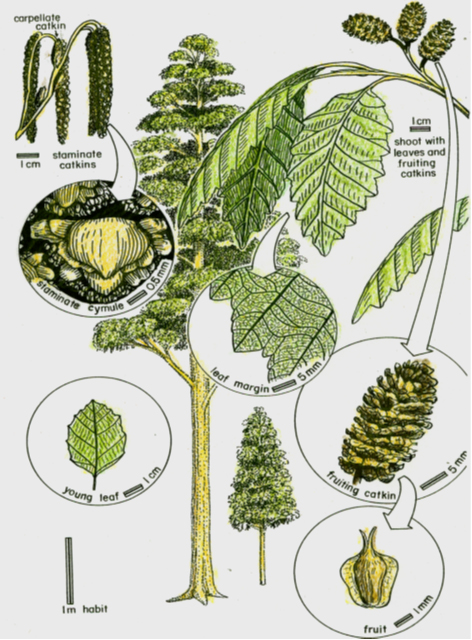
- Reconstruction of Alnus heterodonta

Scientific classification
- Kingdom: Plantae
- Clade: Tracheophytes
- Clade: Angiosperms
- Clade: Eudicots
- Clade: Rosids
- Order: Fagales
- Family: Betulaceae
- Genus: Alnus
- Species: †A. heterodonta

Binomial name
- †Alnus heterodonta (Newberry) Meyer & Manchester

= Alnus heterodonta =

Alnus heterodonta Temporal range: Oligocene

Extinct species of alder

Alnus heterodonta is an extinct species of alder from the early Oligocene Bridge Creek floras of Central Oregon
