= Alnus orientalis =

Conservation status
- Data Deficient (IUCN 3.1)

Scientific classification
- Kingdom: Plantae
- Clade: Embryophytes
- Clade: Tracheophytes
- Clade: Angiosperms
- Clade: Eudicots
- Clade: Rosids
- Order: Fagales
- Family: Betulaceae
- Genus: Alnus
- Species: A. orientalis

Binomial name
- Alnus orientalis Decne.

Synonyms
- Alnus longifolia Bové ex Spach; Alnus oblongata Kotschy ex Regel; Alnus orientalis var. longifolia H.J.P.Winkl.; Alnus orientalis var. ovalifolia H.J.P.Winkl.; Alnus orientalis f. puberula Callier; Alnus orientalis var. pubescens Dippel; Alnus orientalis f. tomentosa (Hartig) H.J.P.Winkl.; Alnus orientalis var. weissii H.J.P.Winkl.; Alnus orientalis f. winkleri Callier; Alnus tomentosa Hartig; Betula longifolia Bové ex Spach

Species of alder

Alnus orientalis, the Oriental alder, is a deciduous, short-lived species of alder (Alnus). It grows up to 50 meters high, and is native to Cyprus and Cilicia. Its catkins are brown, and bloom from January to March. It usually lives near water, and is resistant to atmospheric pollution, and, like many other alders, is able to capture atmospheric nitrogen with its roots. It is found in Southern Turkey, northwest Syria, Cyprus, Lebanon, and Iran.
