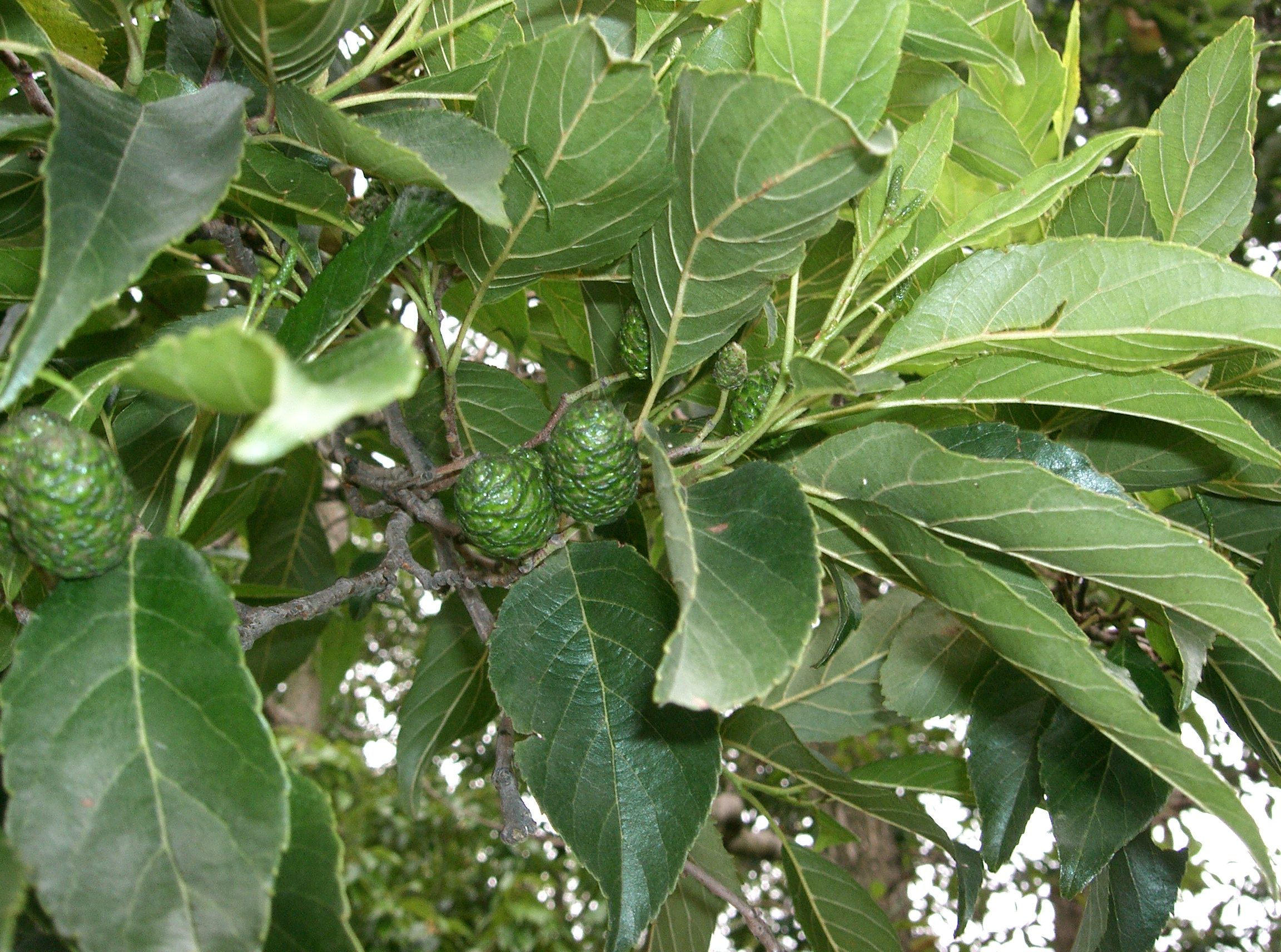

Conservation status
- Least Concern (IUCN 3.1)

Scientific classification
- Kingdom: Plantae
- Clade: Embryophytes
- Clade: Tracheophytes
- Clade: Angiosperms
- Clade: Eudicots
- Clade: Rosids
- Order: Fagales
- Family: Betulaceae
- Genus: Alnus
- Species: A. japonica

Binomial name
- Alnus japonica (Thunb.) Steud.

Synonyms
- Synonymy: Alnus × borealis var. koreana (Callier) Nakai; Alnus harinoki Siebold, nom. nud.; Alnus japonica Siebold & Zucc., nom. illeg. homonym. post.; Alnus japonica f. arguta (Regel) H.Ohba; Alnus japonica var. arguta (Regel) Callier; Alnus japonica var. genuina Callier, not validly publ.; Alnus japonica f. koreana (Callier) H.Ohba; Alnus japonica var. koreana Callier; Alnus japonica var. latifolia Callier; Alnus japonica var. minor Miq.; Alnus japonica var. reginosa Nakai; Alnus japonica var. rufa Nakai; Alnus japonica var. rufinervis Honda; Alnus japonica var. serrata Nakai; Alnus japonica f. serrata (Nakai) M.Kim; Alnus japonica var. villosa L.Zhao & D.Chen; Alnus maritima var. arguta Regel; Alnus maritima var. japonica (Thunb.) Regel; Alnus reginosa Nakai; Betula japonica Thunb. (1799)

= Alnus japonica =

Species of flowering plant

Alnus japonica, known as Japanese alder, is a species of Alnus tree from Japan, Korea, Taiwan, eastern China, and the southern Russian Far East.
