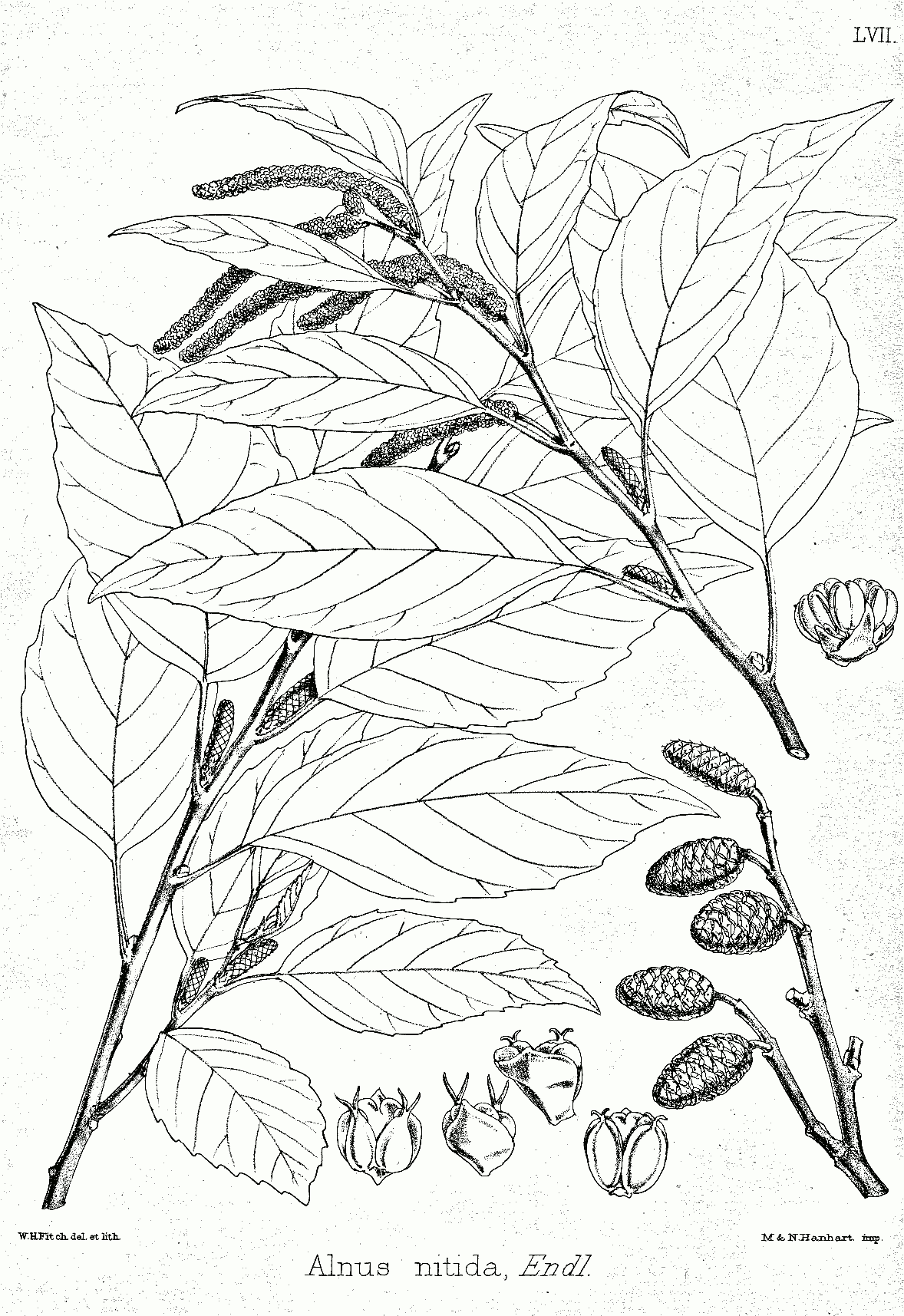
- Botanical illustration

Conservation status
- Least Concern (IUCN 3.1)

Scientific classification
- Kingdom: Plantae
- Clade: Embryophytes
- Clade: Tracheophytes
- Clade: Angiosperms
- Clade: Eudicots
- Clade: Rosids
- Order: Fagales
- Family: Betulaceae
- Genus: Alnus
- Species: A. nitida

Binomial name
- Alnus nitida (Spach) Endl.

Synonyms
- Clethropsis nitida Spach

= Alnus nitida =

Species of tree

Alnus nitida, the west Himalayan alder, is a species in the genus Alnus, native to Pakistan, the western Himalayas, and Nepal. It is a tree reaching 20 to 25 m (66 to 82 ft), preferring to live along the banks of rivers. It is used locally for timber and firewood, and as a street tree. The bark is used in some places for tanning and dyeing purposes. It grows well in heavy, clay soils and tolerates infertile soils. The leaves are thin, oval to ovate, 3–6 inches (7.6–15.2 cm) long and 2–3 inches (5.1–7.6 cm) wide. Female flowers appear first, followed by male catkinss in September to October, which may be up to 19 cm (7.5 in) long. The fruits are woody cones, typically 2.5–3.5 cm (1.0–1.4 in) long.

This tree may be attacked by the apple stem borer (Trirachys holosericeus).

In some places, the bark is used as an anti-inflammatory. One study examined its chemical components and concluded it has antioxidant potential.
