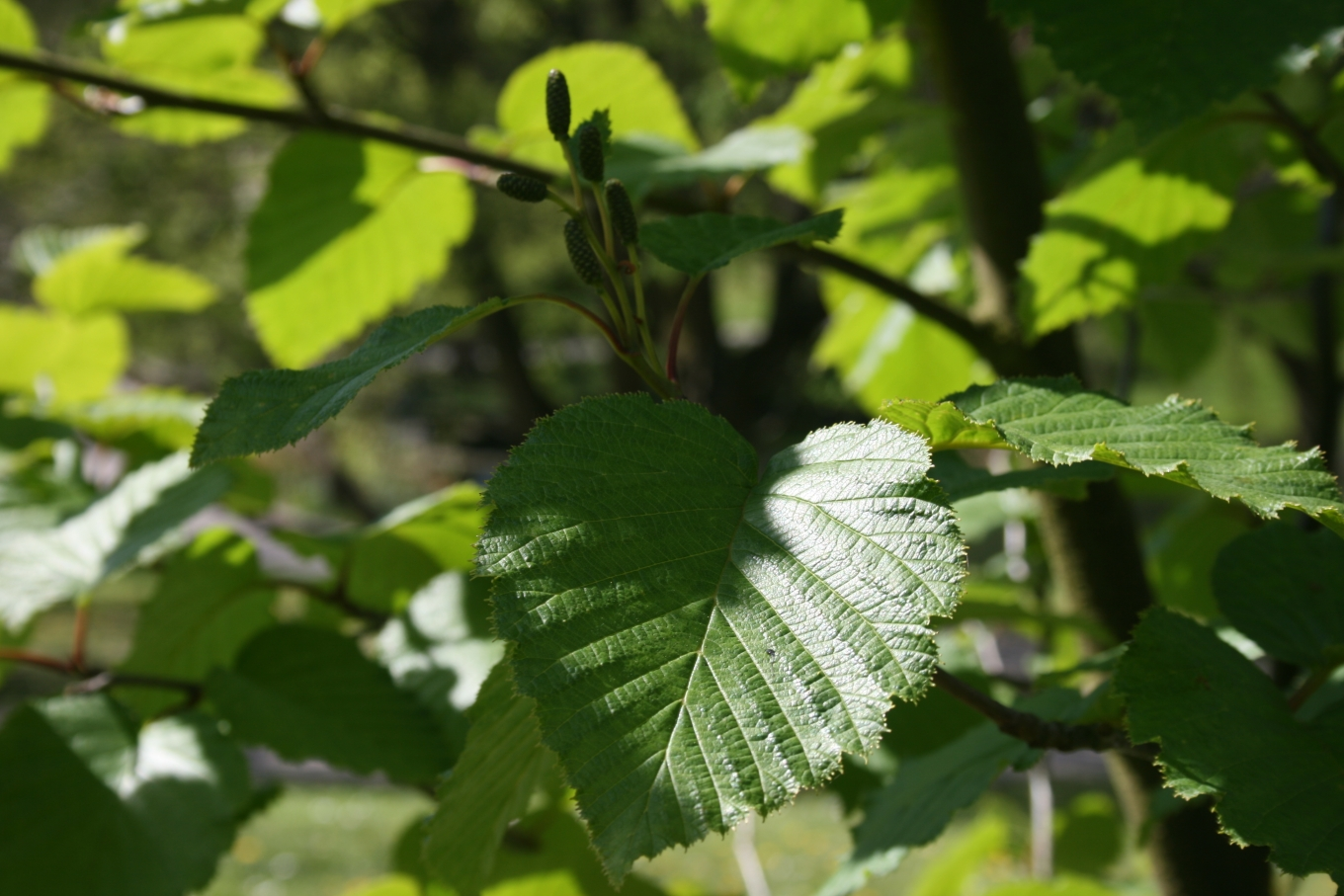

Scientific classification
- Kingdom: Plantae
- Clade: Embryophytes
- Clade: Tracheophytes
- Clade: Angiosperms
- Clade: Eudicots
- Clade: Rosids
- Order: Fagales
- Family: Betulaceae
- Genus: Alnus
- Species: A. maximowiczii

Binomial name
- Alnus maximowiczii Callier

Synonyms
- Alnus crispa subsp. maximowiczii (Callier) Hultén; Alnaster crispus subsp. maximowiczii (Callier) Murai; Alnaster crispus var. maximowiczii (Callier) Murai; Duschekia maximowiczii (Callier) Pouzar; Alnaster maximowiczii (Callier) Czerep.; Alnus viridis subsp. maximowiczii (Callier) D.Löve; Alnus fruticosa var. sachalinensis Koidz.; Alnus alnobetula subvar. sachalinensis (Koidz.) Makino & Nemoto; Alnus maximowiczii var. sachalinensis (Koidz.) Nemoto; Alnus crispa var. sachalinensis (Koidz.) H.Hara; Alnaster crispus var. sachalinensis (Koidz.) Murai

= Alnus maximowiczii =

Species of flowering plant

Alnus maximowiczii, commonly known as montane alder, is a species of alder tree native to Japan, Korea, and the Russian Far East (Sakhalin, Primorye, Khabarovsk, Kuril Islands).
