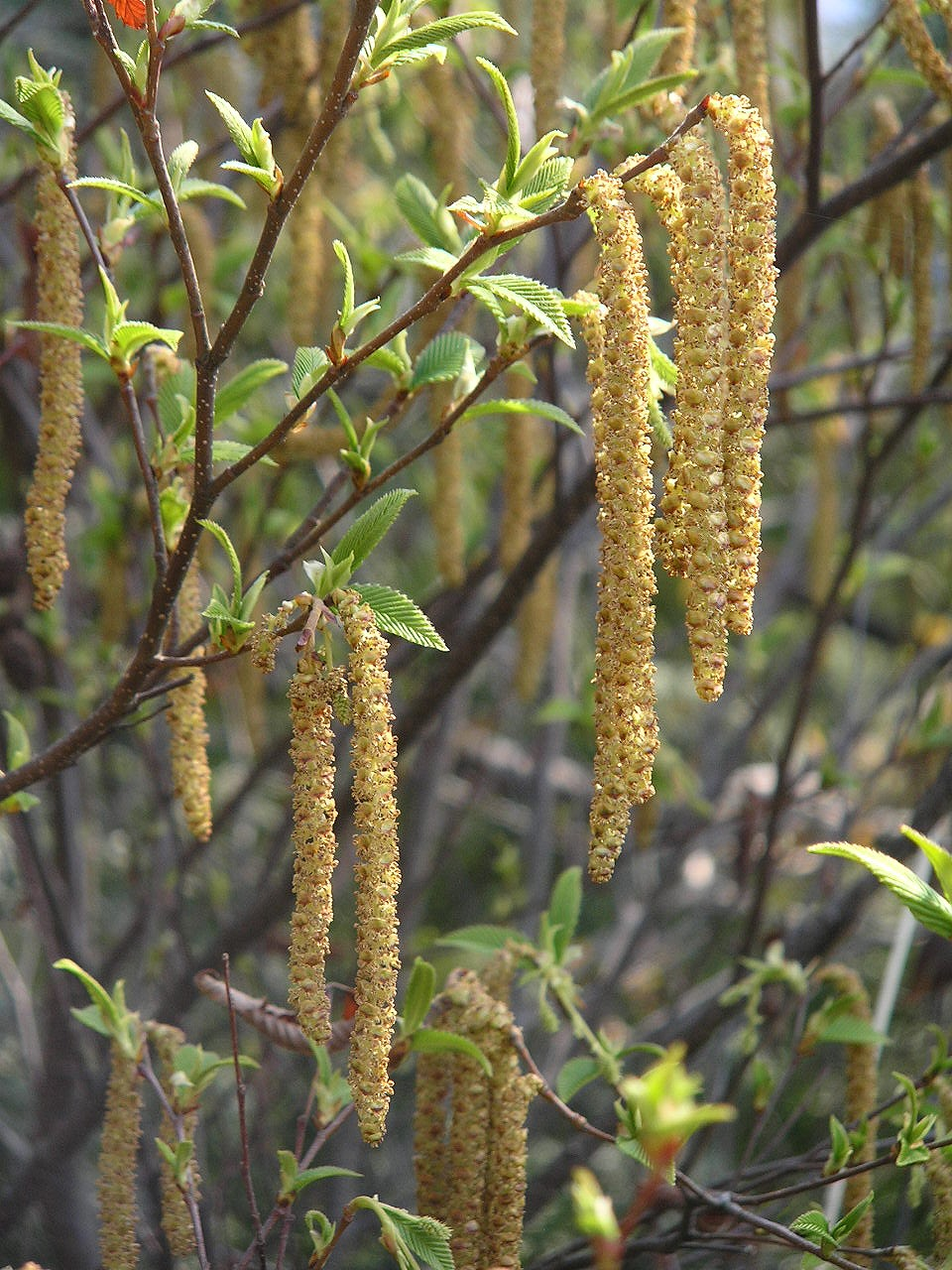

Conservation status
- Data Deficient (IUCN 3.1)

Scientific classification
- Kingdom: Plantae
- Clade: Tracheophytes
- Clade: Angiosperms
- Clade: Eudicots
- Clade: Rosids
- Order: Fagales
- Family: Betulaceae
- Genus: Alnus
- Species: A. firma

Binomial name
- Alnus firma Siebold & Zucc.

Synonyms
- Alnus firma var. yasha (Matsum.) Winkl.; Alnus yasha Matsum.

= Alnus firma =

Species of flowering plant

Alnus firma is a species of tree in the family Betulaceae. It is endemic to Japan, where it is known as yashabushi (Japanese: ヤシャブシ).

== Uses ==
Japanese woodworkers use the fruit to create a brown dye for staining Paulownia tomentosa called yasha-shiage.

Scientific investigations have revealed that A. firma may be a good candidate for phytoremediation of heavy metals, especially in concert with its endophytic root bacteria.
