= Alnus matsumurae =

Conservation status
- Least Concern (IUCN 3.1)

Scientific classification
- Kingdom: Plantae
- Clade: Tracheophytes
- Clade: Angiosperms
- Clade: Eudicots
- Clade: Rosids
- Order: Fagales
- Family: Betulaceae
- Genus: Alnus
- Species: A. matsumurae

Binomial name
- Alnus matsumurae Callier (1911)

Synonyms
- Alnus emarginata Shirai; Alnus hirsuta var. emarginata (Shirai) Kudô; Alnus incana var. emarginata Matsum.

Species of plant

Alnus matsumurae is a tree species that belongs to the family Betulaceae. It is endemic to Japan, where it is native to northern and central Honshu. It flowers in May and June and fruits in November. It grows in montane forest, where it is often a pioneer plant in rocky areas.
