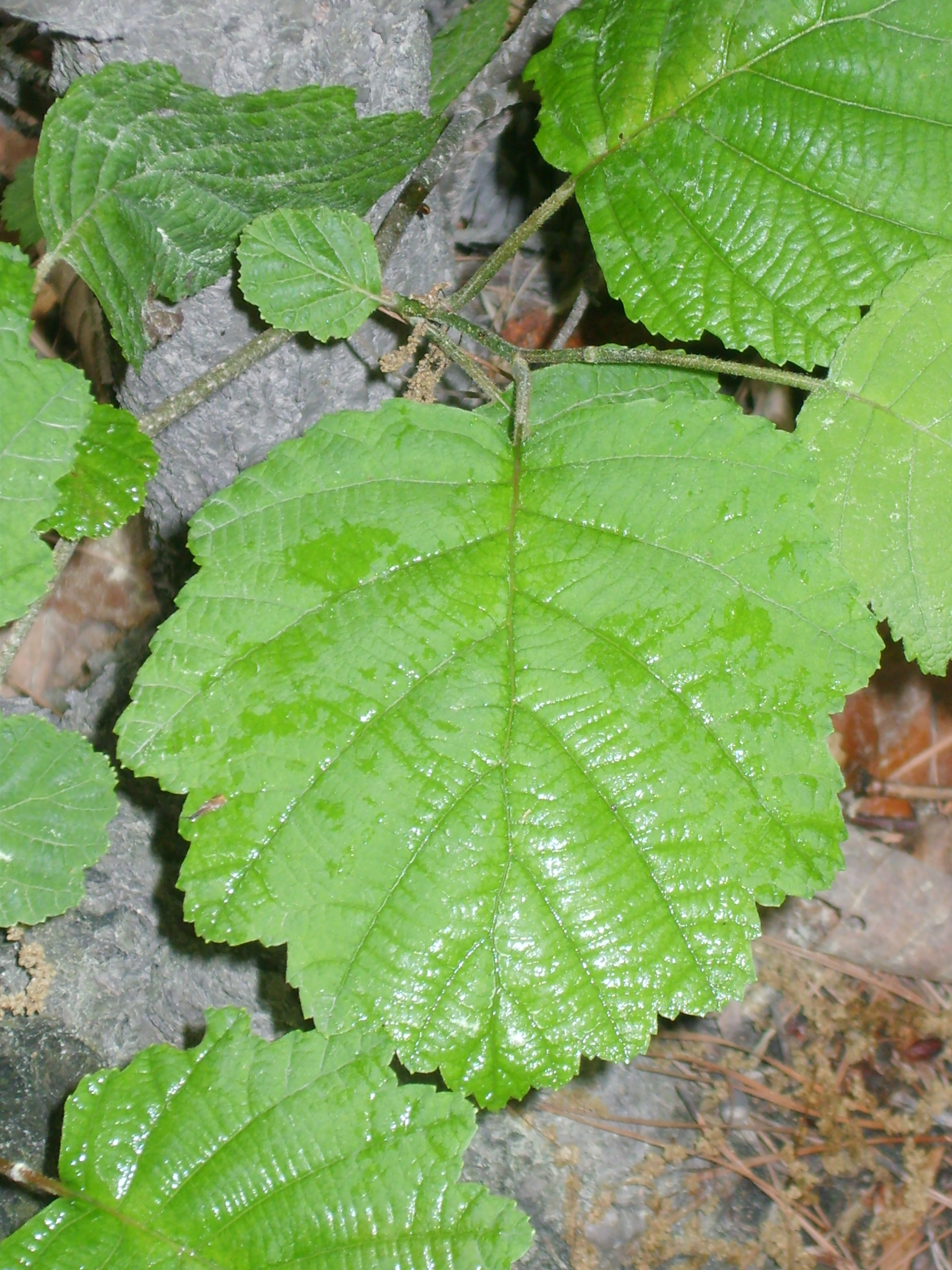

Conservation status
- Least Concern (IUCN 3.1)

Scientific classification
- Kingdom: Plantae
- Clade: Embryophytes
- Clade: Tracheophytes
- Clade: Angiosperms
- Clade: Eudicots
- Clade: Rosids
- Order: Fagales
- Family: Betulaceae
- Genus: Alnus
- Species: A. hirsuta

Binomial name
- Alnus hirsuta (Spach) Rupr.

Synonyms
- Synonymy: Alnus hirsuta f. inokumae (Murai & Kusaka) H.Ohba; Alnus hirsuta f. macrophylla Callier; Alnus hirsuta var. microphylla (Nakai) Tatew.; Alnus hirsuta f. sibirica (Spach) H.Ohba; Alnus hirsuta var. sibirica (Spach) C.K.Schneid.; Alnus incana var. glauca Regel; Alnus incana var. hirsuta Spach (1841) (basionym); Alnus incana subsp. hirsuta (Spach) Á.Löve & D.Löve; Alnus incana f. hirsuta Regel; Alnus incana var. sibirica Spach; Alnus incana subsp. tchangbokii Chin S.Chang & H.Kim; Alnus incana var. tinctoria (Sarg.) H.J.P.Winkl.; Alnus inokumae Murai & Kusaka; Alnus sibirica (Spach) Turcz. ex Kom.; Alnus sibirica f. acutiloba Koidz.; Alnus sibirica f. glabra (Callier) Koidz.; Alnus sibirica var. hirsuta (Spach) Koidz.; Alnus sibirica f. hirsutoides Koidz.; Alnus sibirica f. obtusiloba Koidz.; Alnus sibirica var. oxyloba C.K.Schneid.; Alnus sibirica var. paucinervis C.K.Schneid.; Alnus sibirica var. tinctoria (Sarg.) Koidz.; Alnus tinctoria Sarg.; Alnus tinctoria f. acutiloba (Koidz.) H.Hara; Alnus tinctoria var. glabra Callier; Alnus tinctoria f. hirsutoides (Koidz.) H.Hara; Alnus tinctoria var. mandschurica Callier; Alnus tinctoria var. microphylla Nakai; Alnus tinctoria var. obtusiloba Callier; Alnus tinctoria var. velutina H.Hara; Alnus viridis var. sibirica (Spach) Regel, nom. illeg. homonym. post.

= Alnus hirsuta =

Species of flowering plant

Alnus hirsuta is a species of flowering plant in the family Betulaceae. It is a tree native to Japan, Korea, northern China, the Russian Far east, and eastern Siberia. It is closely related to grey alder Alnus incana, and has sometimes been treated as a subspecies of it Alnus incana subsp. hirsuta (Spach) Á.Löve & D.Löve on the grounds that it hybridises freely with it when brought together in cultivation. It differs from grey alder in larger leaves and larger seed catkins.

== Description ==
It is a tree growing to 20–25 metres (66–82 ft) tall, usually with a single, straight trunk, with grey bark. The leaves are green above, grey-green below, with coarsely double-toothed margins, 3–11 cm (1.2–4.3 in) long and 2.5–9 cm (1.0–3.5 in) broad.
