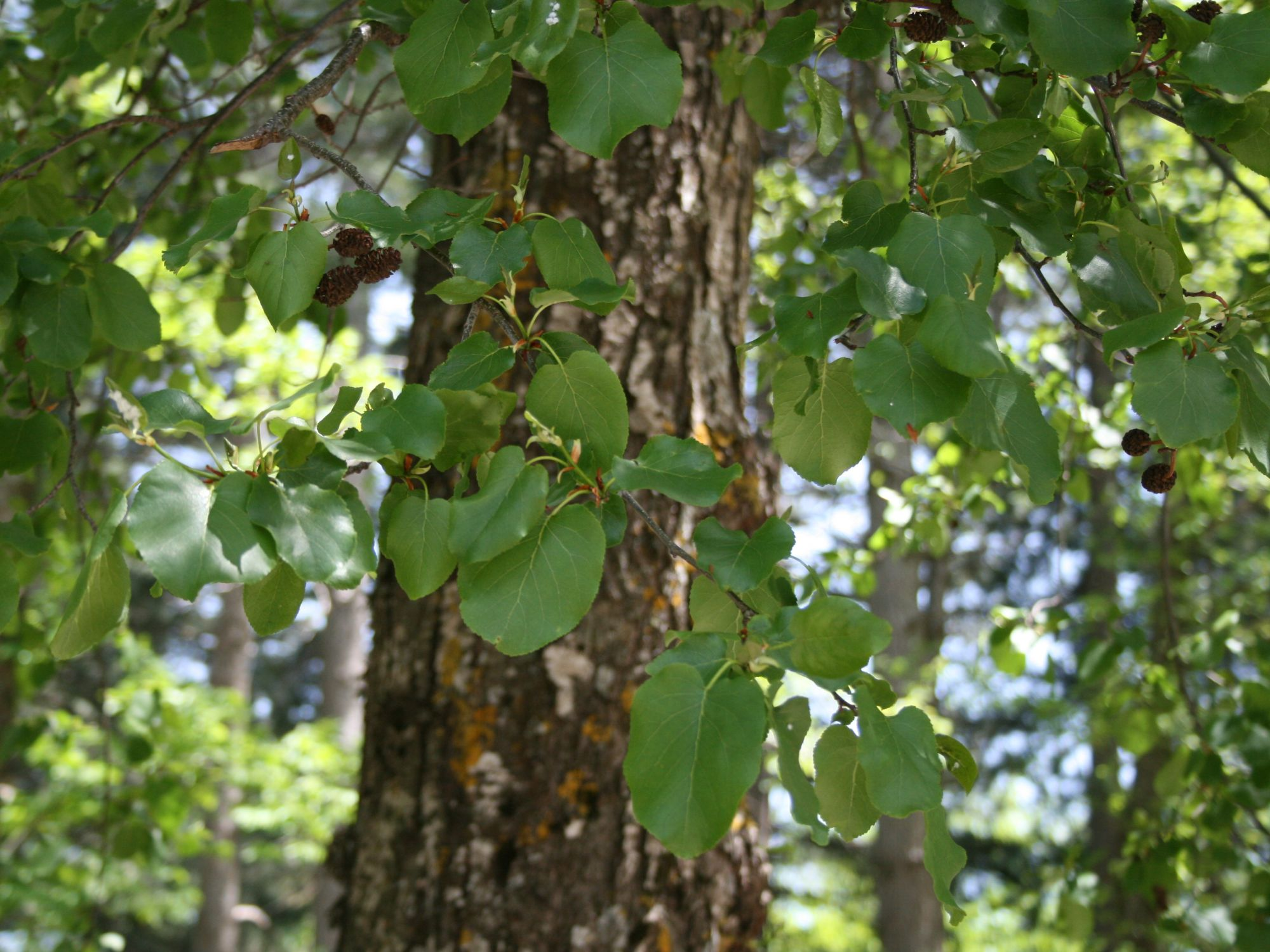
- Alnus cordata in Aspromonte, Italy

Conservation status
- Least Concern (IUCN 3.1)

Scientific classification
- Kingdom: Plantae
- Clade: Tracheophytes
- Clade: Angiosperms
- Clade: Eudicots
- Clade: Rosids
- Order: Fagales
- Family: Betulaceae
- Genus: Alnus
- Subgenus: Alnus subg. Alnus
- Species: A. cordata

Binomial name
- Alnus cordata (Loisel.) Duby
- Distribution map

Synonyms
- Betula cordata Loisel.; Alnus rotundifolia Bertol.; Alnus neapolitana Savi; Alnus cordata Desf., invalid, no description nor basionym reference; Alnus cordifolia Ten.; Alnus obcordata C.A.Mey. ex Steud.; Alnus macrocarpa Req. ex Nyman; Alnus nervosus Dippel

= Alnus cordata =

Species of plant

Alnus cordata, the Italian alder, is a tree or shrub species belonging to the family Betulaceae, and native to the southern Apennine Mountains (Campania, Basilicata and Calabria, mainly on western mountain sides) and the north-eastern mountains of Corsica. It has been introduced in Sicily, Sardinia, and more recently in Central-Northern Italy, other European countries (France, Belgium, Spain, Portugal, United Kingdom) and extra-European countries (Chile, New Zealand), where it has become naturalised.

== Description ==
It is a medium-sized tree growing up to 25 m (80 feet) tall (exceptionally to 28 m or 90 feet), with a trunk up to 70–100 centimetres (30–40 in) in diameter.

The leaves are deciduous but with a very long season in leaf, from April to December in the Northern Hemisphere; they are alternate, ovate or circular-ovate shaped, cordate at base, rich glossy green, 5–12 cm (2–4 3/4 inches) long, with a finely serrated margin. The bark is smooth with greyish brown colour. The trees' large leaf areas are partly due to their long tree tops. Fall arrives usually around the end of November, and the leaves don't change from their original green color. The colorful foliage may last till mid-December in certain years.

The slender cylindrical male contain 5 - 6 catkins, pendulous, reddish and up to 10 cm (4 inches) long; pollination is in early spring, before the leaves emerge. The female catkins are ovoid, when mature in autumn 2–3 cm (3/4–1 1/8 inches) long and 1.5–2 cm (5/8–3/4 inch) broad, dark green to brown, hard, woody, and they develop into pseudo-cones. The small winged seeds disperse by wind and through the winter they ripen, turning from green to dark brown colour, and they open the following spring.

It has three natural growing shapes. 1) Along rivers with room to grow and plenty of water one base will often give rise to four to six stems, which fan out at some ten degrees from vertical. 2) In open meadows near rivers, marshy ground and flooding can cause trees to angle or tilt over, whereupon over a matter of seasons they grow natural bends to return the upper trunk to vertical. It is not uncommon to find trunks with S shapes arising from two tilting events. 3) In groves of multiple trees they grow thinner and straighter, such that a grove of a 100 trees can be an excellent renewable source of straight timber good for woodwork.

== Subspecies ==
Two subspecies are accepted.

- Alnus cordata subsp. cordata – northeastern Corsica
- Alnus cordata subsp. neapolitana (Savi) J.-M.Tison – southern Italian Peninsula

== Cultivation ==
Like other alders, it is able to improve soil fertility through symbiotic nitrogen fixation with the bacteria Actinomyces alni (Frankia alni). It thrives on much drier soils than most other alders, and grows rapidly even under very unfavourable circumstances, which renders it extremely valuable for landscape planting on difficult sites such as mining spoil heaps and heavily compacted urban sites. It is commonly grown as a windbreak which helps with soil protection.

Alnus cordata is regarded as a desirable candidate for bioremediation due to its presence in an ecosystem being associated with beneficial effects such as increased amounts of organic carbon and nitrogen-rich litter.

Alnus cordata has gained The Royal Horticultural Society's Award of Garden Merit.

=== Bonsai ===
The Italian Alder makes a medium to large bonsai, a quick grower it responds well to pruning with branches ramifying well and leaf size reducing quite rapidly.

== Other uses ==
Researchers analyzed the phenolic composition of the stem bark of A. cordata, they were able to determine that its components were similar to those of skin-whitening and antioxidant properties. Because these qualities are antioxidant-rich, they can be safely used to treat skin diseases through their bleaching capabilities.

The tree also produces valuable reddish-orange wood. It breaks down when exposed to alternating dry and damp air, but is highly durable when kept wet or dry. As demonstrated in the construction of Venice, when immersed in water it lasts for centuries. Also when used within condensation-free, temperature and humidity controlled buildings it has a reputation for maintaining a smooth and naturally shiny finish. The timber is liked by carpenters and used for turning and carving, for moulding, furniture, panelling and plywood.

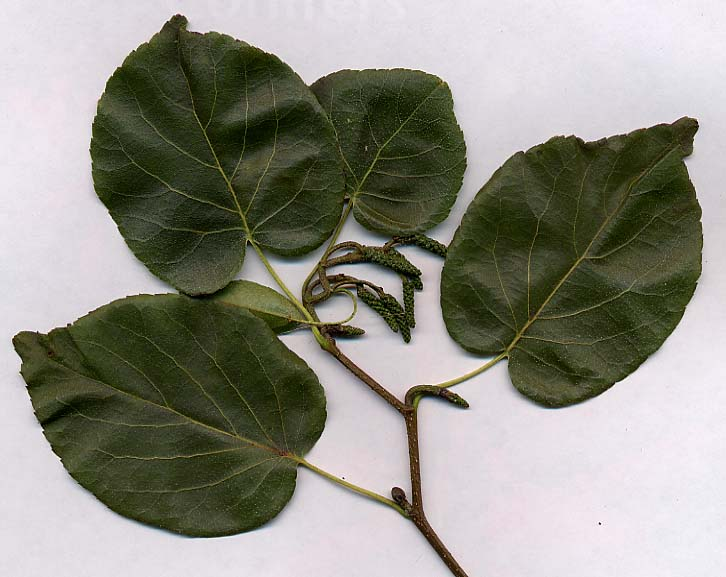
Foliage and immature male catkins

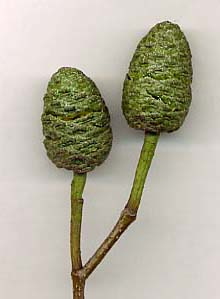
Female (seed) catkins
