= C10H14O2 =

The molecular formula C_{10}H_{14}O_{2} may refer to:

- 6-Amyl-α-pyrone
- 4-tert-Butylcatechol
- tert-Butylhydroquinone
- Camphorquinone
- Ciclotic acid
- Dolichodial
- Idramantone
- Nepetalactone
- 8-Oxogeranial
- Perilla ketone
- Rhododendrol
- Spirodecanedione
- Wine lactone
