= R. aureum =

R. aureum may refer to:

- Rhododendron aureum, a flowering plant species
- Ribes aureum, the buffalo currant, clove currant, golden currant or Missouri currant, a shrub species native to Canada, most of the United States (except the southeast) and northern Mexico

== See also ==
- Aureum
