= C20H25NO3 =

The molecular formula C_{20}H_{25}NO_{3} (molar mass: 327.42 g/mol) may refer to:

- Benactyzine, an antidepressant
- Difemerine, an antimuscarinic
- Dimenoxadol, an opioid analgesic
- Panicudine, an alkaloid
- Traxoprodil, an NMDA antagonist
