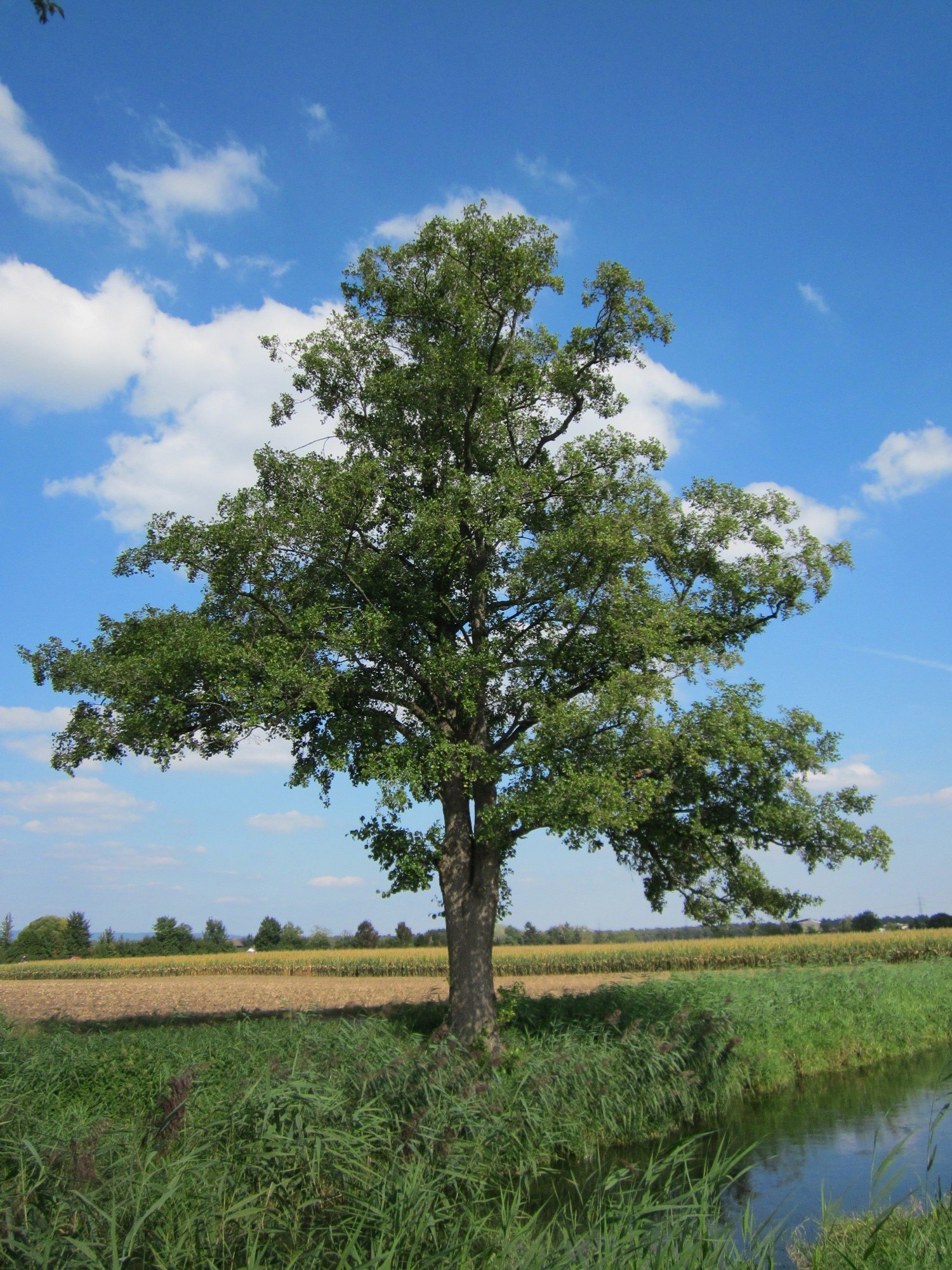

Conservation status
- Least Concern (IUCN 3.1)

Scientific classification
- Kingdom: Plantae
- Clade: Tracheophytes
- Clade: Angiosperms
- Clade: Eudicots
- Clade: Rosids
- Order: Fagales
- Family: Betulaceae
- Genus: Alnus
- Subgenus: Alnus subg. Alnus
- Species: A. glutinosa

Binomial name
- Alnus glutinosa (L.) Gaertn.
- Distribution map

Synonyms
- Alnus glutinosa var. vulgaris Spach, nom. inval.; Alnus vulgaris Hill, nom. inval.; Betula alnus var. glutinosa L.; Betula alnus subsp. glutinosa (L.) Ehrh.; Betula glutinosa (L.) Lam.

= Alnus glutinosa =

Species of flowering plant in the birch family

Alnus glutinosa, the common alder, black alder, European alder, European black alder, or just alder, is a species of tree in the family Betulaceae, native to most of Europe, southwest Asia and northern Africa. It thrives in wet locations where its association with the bacterium Frankia alni enables it to grow in poor quality soils. It is a medium-sized, short-lived tree growing to a height of up to 30 metres (98 feet). It has short-stalked rounded leaves and separate male and female flowers in the form of catkins. The small, rounded fruits are cone-like and the seeds are dispersed by wind and water.

The common alder provides food and shelter for wildlife, with a number of insects, lichens and fungi being completely dependent on the tree. It is a pioneer species, colonising vacant land and forming mixed forests as other trees appear in its wake. Eventually common alder dies out of woodlands because the seedlings need more light than is available on the forest floor. Its more usual habitat is forest edges, swamps and riverside corridors. The timber has been used in underwater foundations and for manufacture of paper and fibreboard, for smoking foods, for joinery, turnery and carving. Products of the tree have been used in ethnobotany, providing folk remedies for various ailments, and research has shown that extracts of the seeds are active against pathogenic bacteria.

== Description ==
A. glutinosa is a tree that thrives in moist soils, and grows under favourable circumstances to a height of 20 to 30 metres (66 to 98 feet) and exceptionally up to 37 m (121 ft). Young trees have an upright habit of growth with a main axial stem but older trees develop an arched crown with crooked branches. The base of the trunk produces adventitious roots which grow down to the soil and may appear to be propping the trunk up. The bark of young trees is smooth, glossy and greenish-brown while in older trees it is dark grey and fissured. The branches are smooth and somewhat sticky, being scattered with resinous warts. The buds are purplish-brown and have short stalks. Both male and female catkins form in the autumn and remain dormant during the winter.

The leaves of the common alder are short-stalked, rounded, up to 10 centimetres (4 inches) long with a slightly wedge-shaped base and a wavy, serrated margin. They have a glossy dark green upper surface and paler green underside with rusty-brown hairs in the angles of the veins. As with some other trees growing near water, the common alder keeps its leaves longer than do trees in drier situations, and the leaves remain green late into the autumn. As the Latin name glutinosa implies, the buds and young leaves are sticky with a resinous gum.

The species is monoecious and the flowers are wind-pollinated; the slender cylindrical male catkins are pendulous, reddish in colour and 5 to 10 cm (2 to 4 in) long; the female flowers are upright, broad and green, with short stalks. During the autumn they become dark brown to black in colour, hard, somewhat woody, and superficially similar to small conifer cones. They last through the winter and the small winged seeds are mostly scattered the following spring. The seeds are flattened reddish-brown nuts edged with webbing filled with pockets of air. This enables them to float for about a month which allows the seed to disperse widely.

Unlike some other species of tree, common alders do not produce shade leaves. The respiration rate of shaded foliage is the same as well-lit leaves but the rate of assimilation is lower. This means that as a tree in woodland grows taller, the lower branches die and soon decay, leaving a small crown and unbranched trunk.

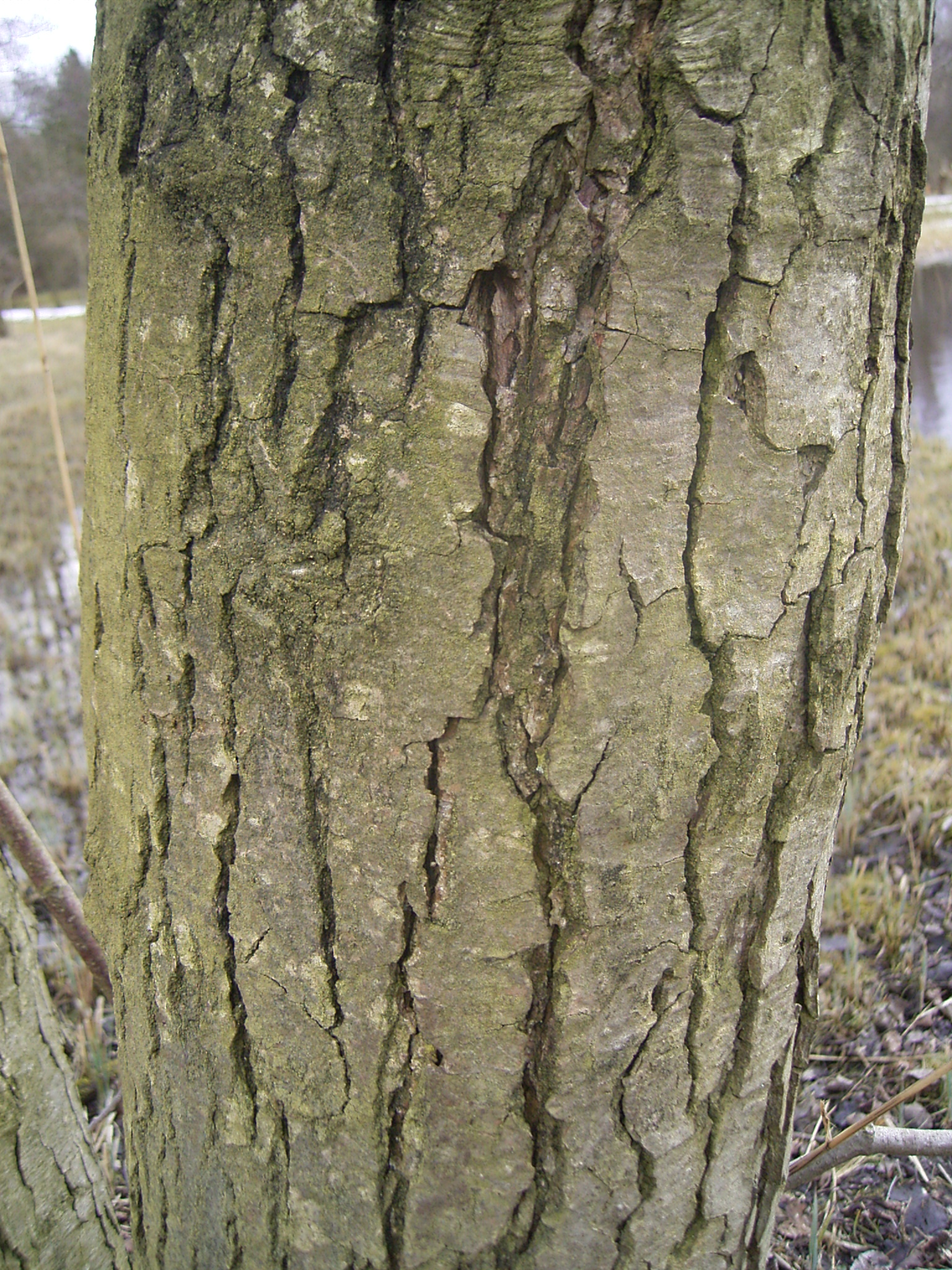
Bark

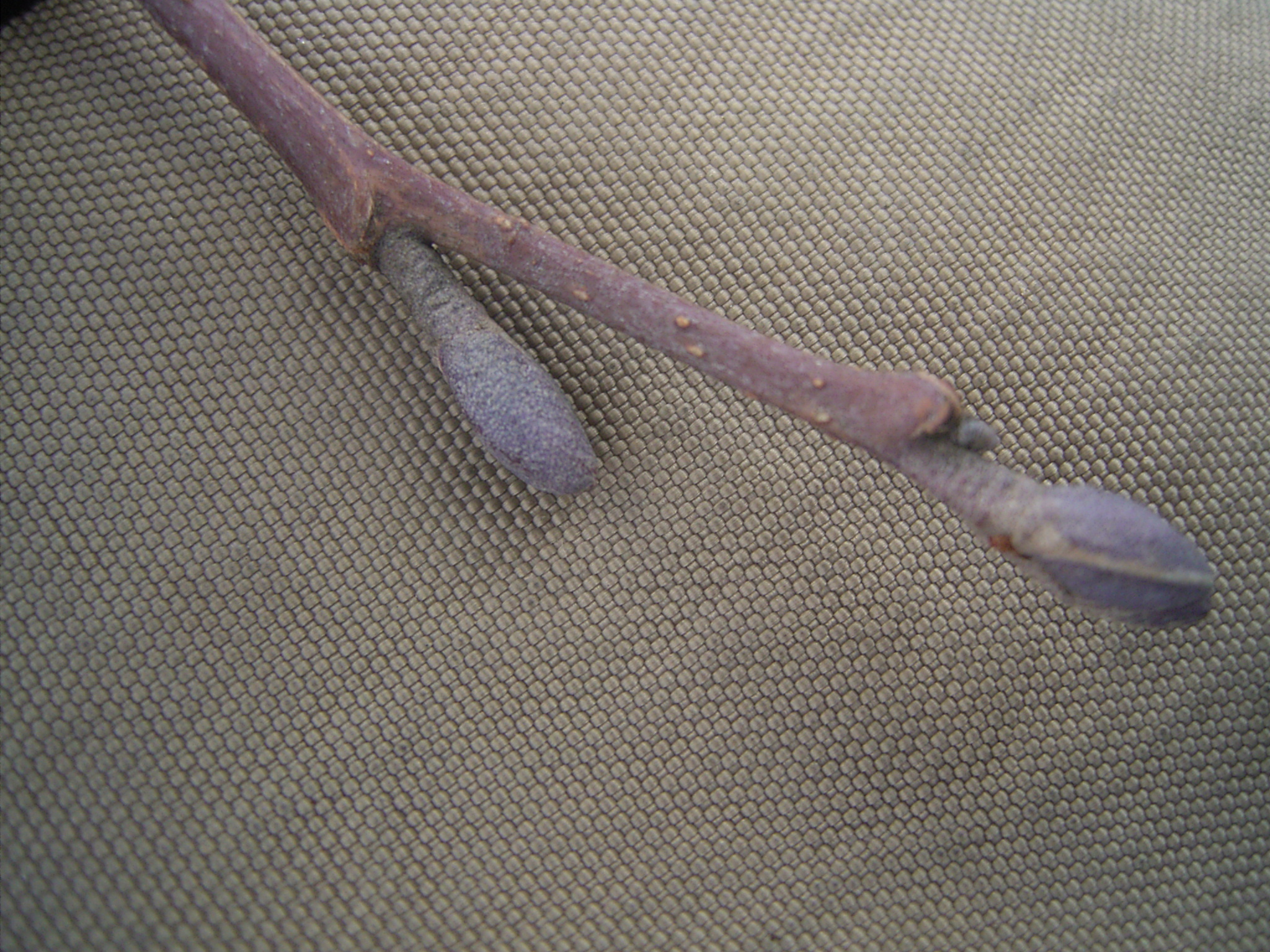
Buds

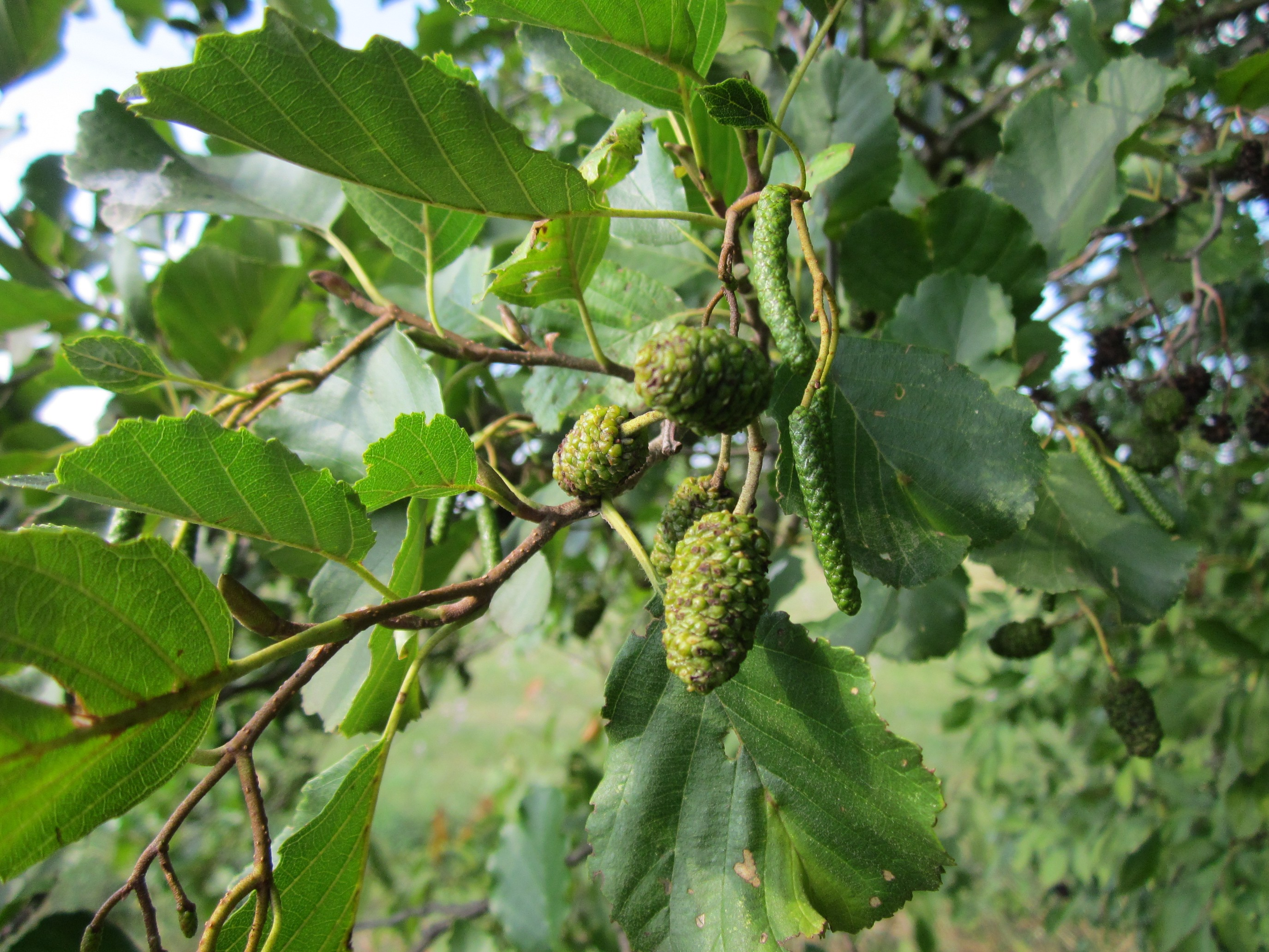
Foliage

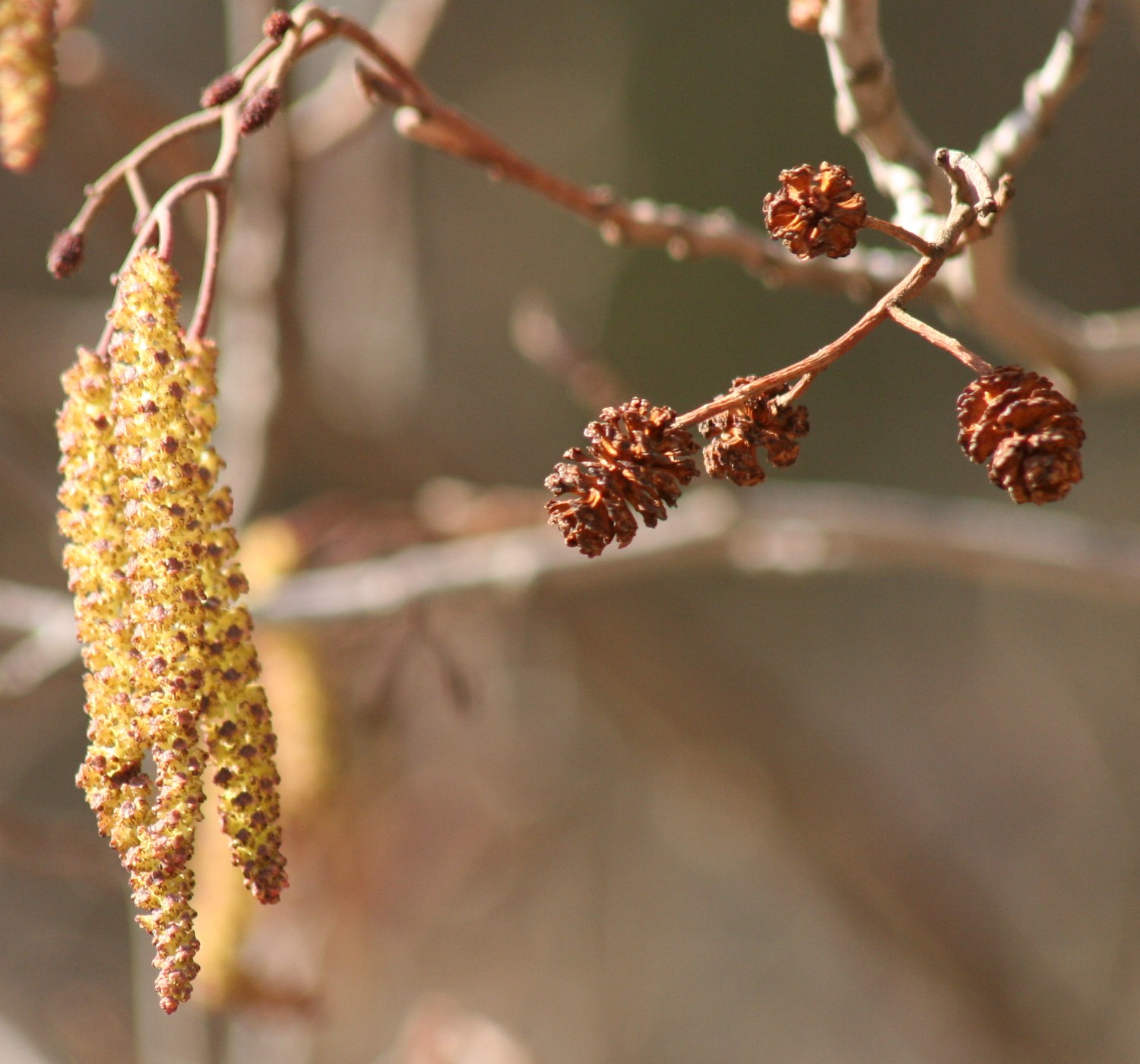
Inflorescence showing male catkins (left) and mature female cone-like catkins (right)

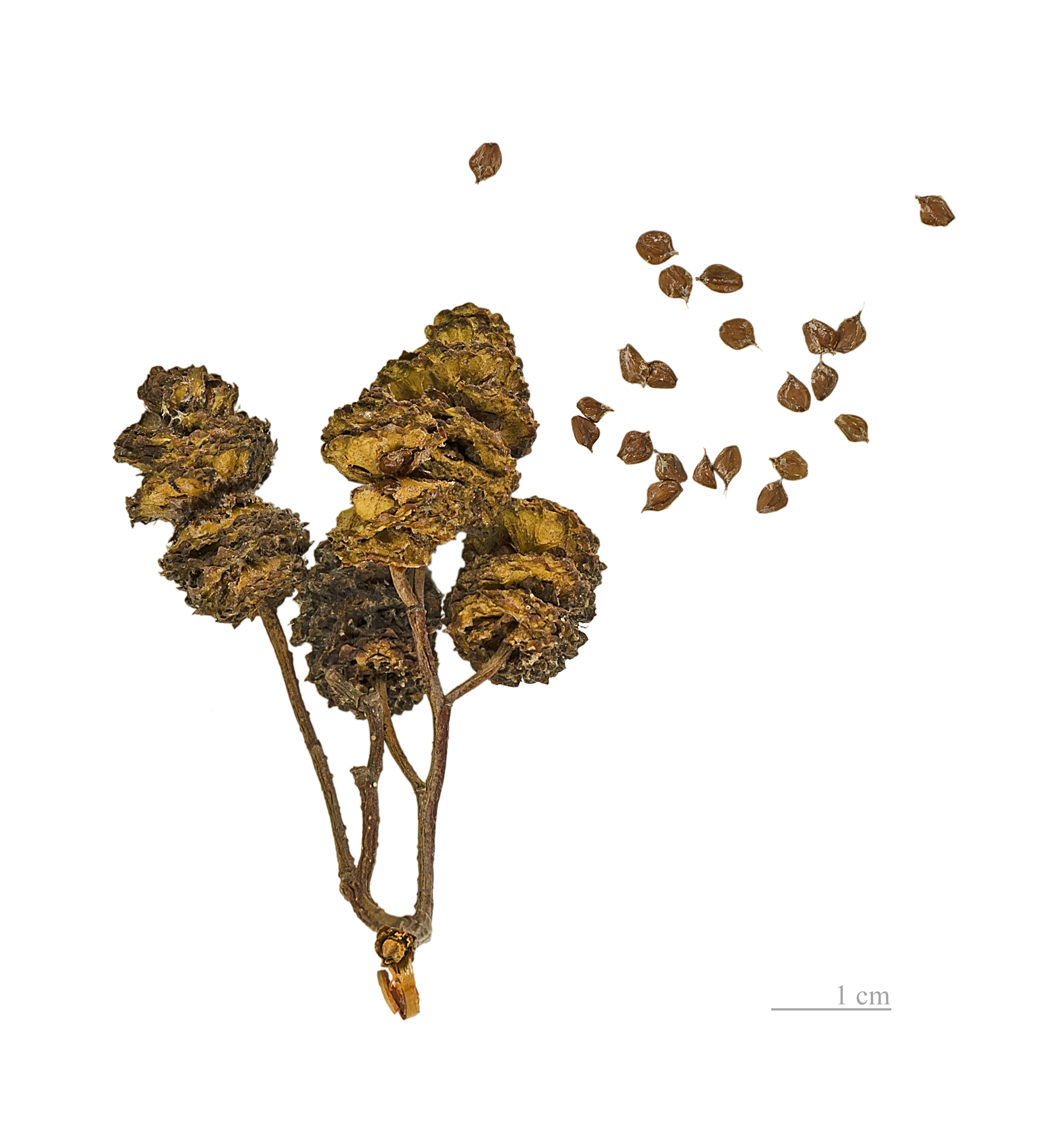
Infrutescence and achenes

== Taxonomy ==
A. glutinosa was first described by Carl Linnaeus in 1753, as one of two varieties of alder (the other being Alnus incana), which he regarded as a single species Betula alnus. In 1785, Jean-Baptiste Lamarck treated it as a full species under the name Betula glutinosa. Its present scientific name is due to Joseph Gaertner, who in 1791 accepted the separation of alders from birches, and transferred the species to Alnus. The epithet glutinosa means "sticky", referring particularly to the young shoots.

Within the genus Alnus, the common alder is placed in subgenus Alnus as part of a closely related group of species including the grey alder, A. incana, with which it hybridizes to form the hybrid A. × hybrida. Both species are diploid. In 2017, populations formerly considered to be A. glutinosa were found to be separate, polyploid species: A. lusitanica, which is native to the Iberian Peninsula and Morocco, and A. rohlenae, which is native to the western part of the Balkan Peninsula.

== Distribution and habitat ==
The common alder is native to almost the whole of continental Europe (except for both the extreme north and south) as well as the United Kingdom and Ireland. In Asia its range includes Turkey, Iran and Kazakhstan, and in Africa it is found in Tunisia, Algeria and Morocco. It is naturalised in the Azores. It has been introduced, either by accident or by intent, to Canada, the United States, Chile, South Africa, Australia and New Zealand. Its natural habitat is in moist ground near rivers, ponds and lakes but it can also grow in drier locations and sometimes occurs in mixed woodland and on forest edges. In Britain, alder is a key component of various important types of riparian and wetland woodland such as W4, W5 and W6, and there are similar vegetation communities across Europe. It tolerates a range of soil types and grows best at a pH of between 5.5 and 7.2. Because of its association with the nitrogen-fixing bacterium Frankia alni, it can grow in nutrient-poor soils where few other trees thrive.

European alder does not usually grow in areas where the average daily temperature is below freezing for longer than six months; its range is mainly restricted in Scandinavia, but it also habitats other regions.

It requires 500 millimeters of rain to fall annually in the southeastern boundary distribution of Eurasia. Although European alder can withstand winter temperatures as low as −54 °C, winter damage causes 80% of young European alder plantings in North Carolina to die back.

Given the overwinter minimum of −18 °C, early low temperatures in November and December may have caused more damage than the intense cold.

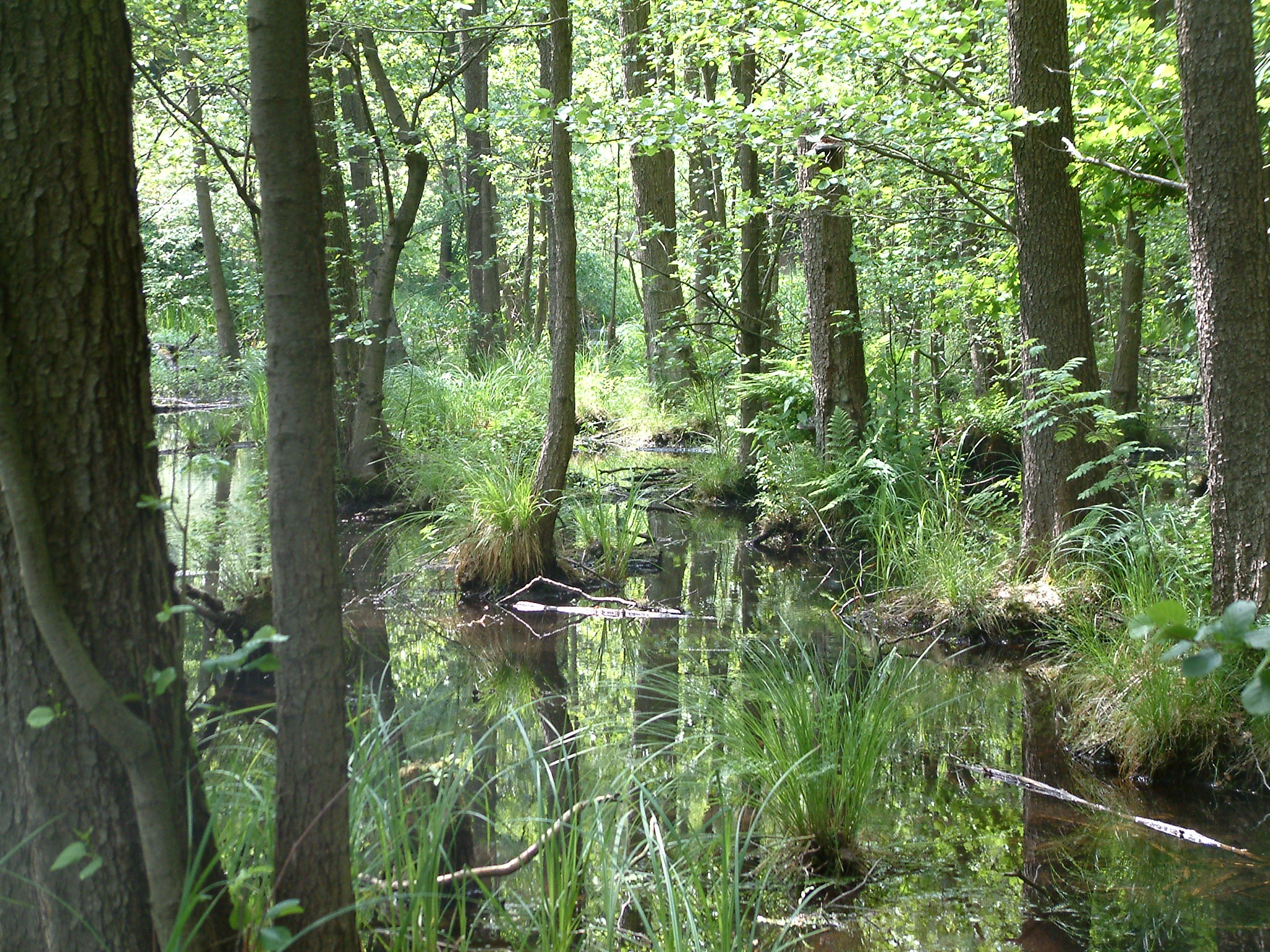
Alder carr in Germany

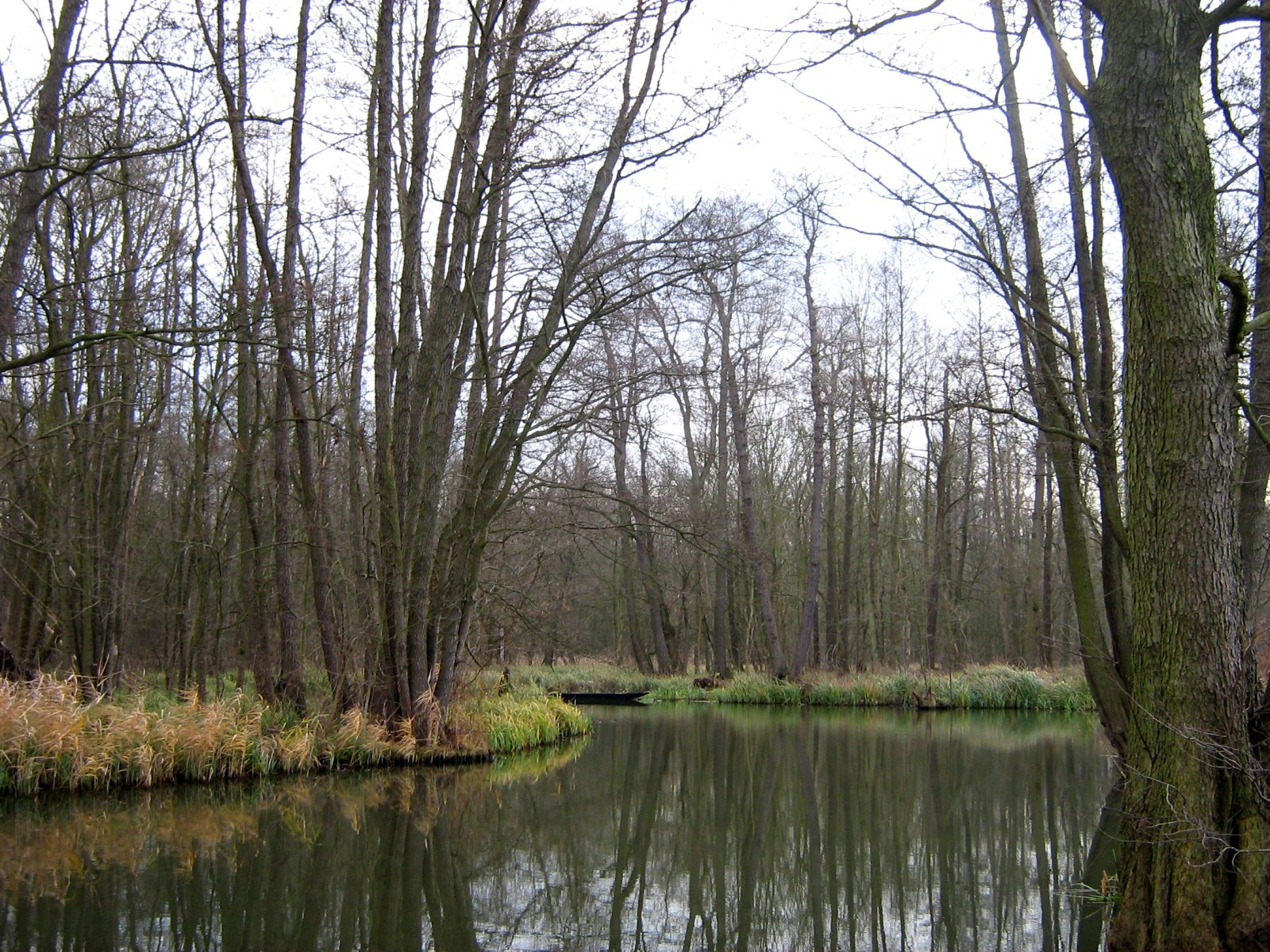
Trees in winter, Germany

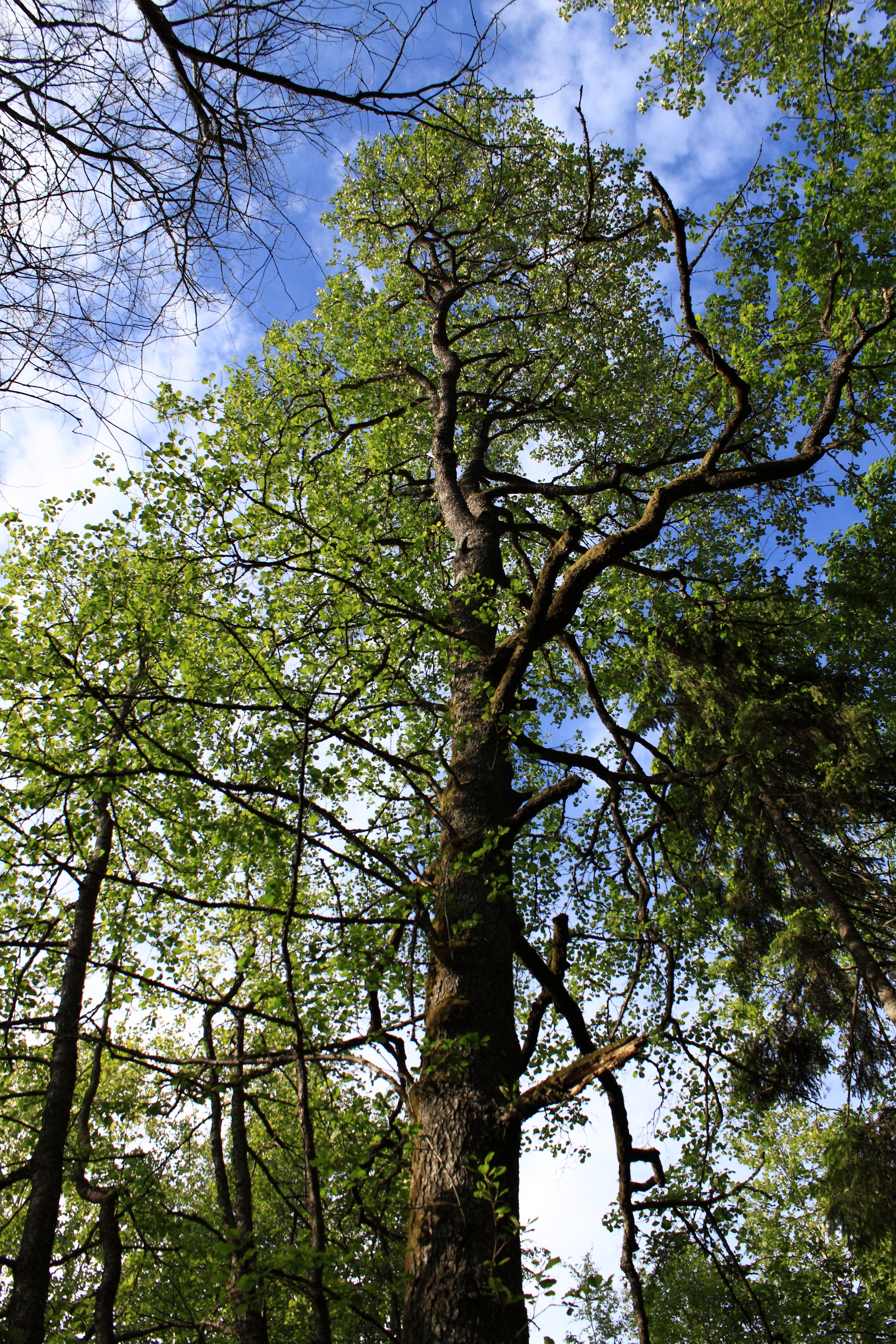
Black alder in Ås, Norway

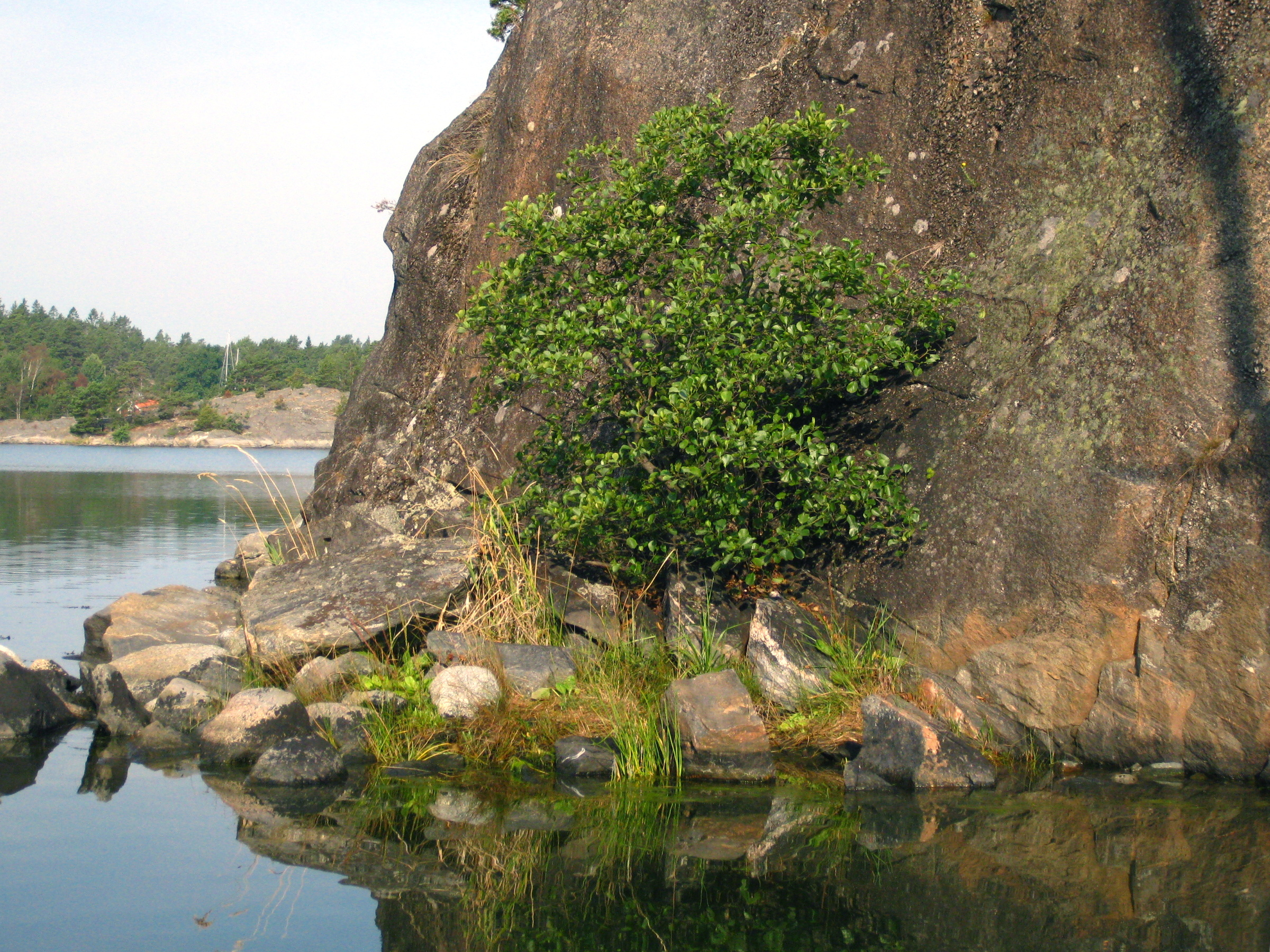
Black alder defies harsh conditions in the Swedish archipelago

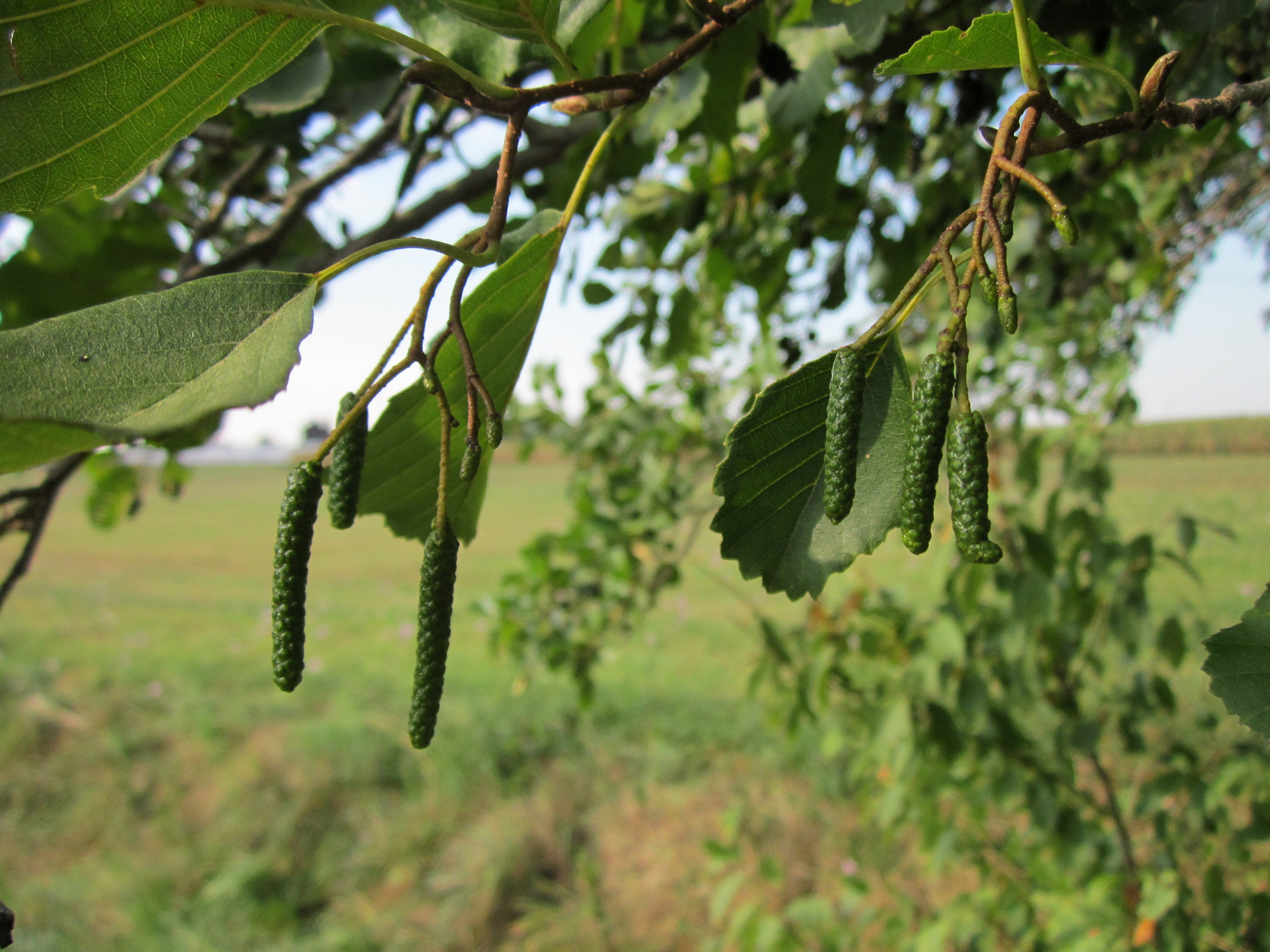
September foliage in Reilingen

== Ecology ==
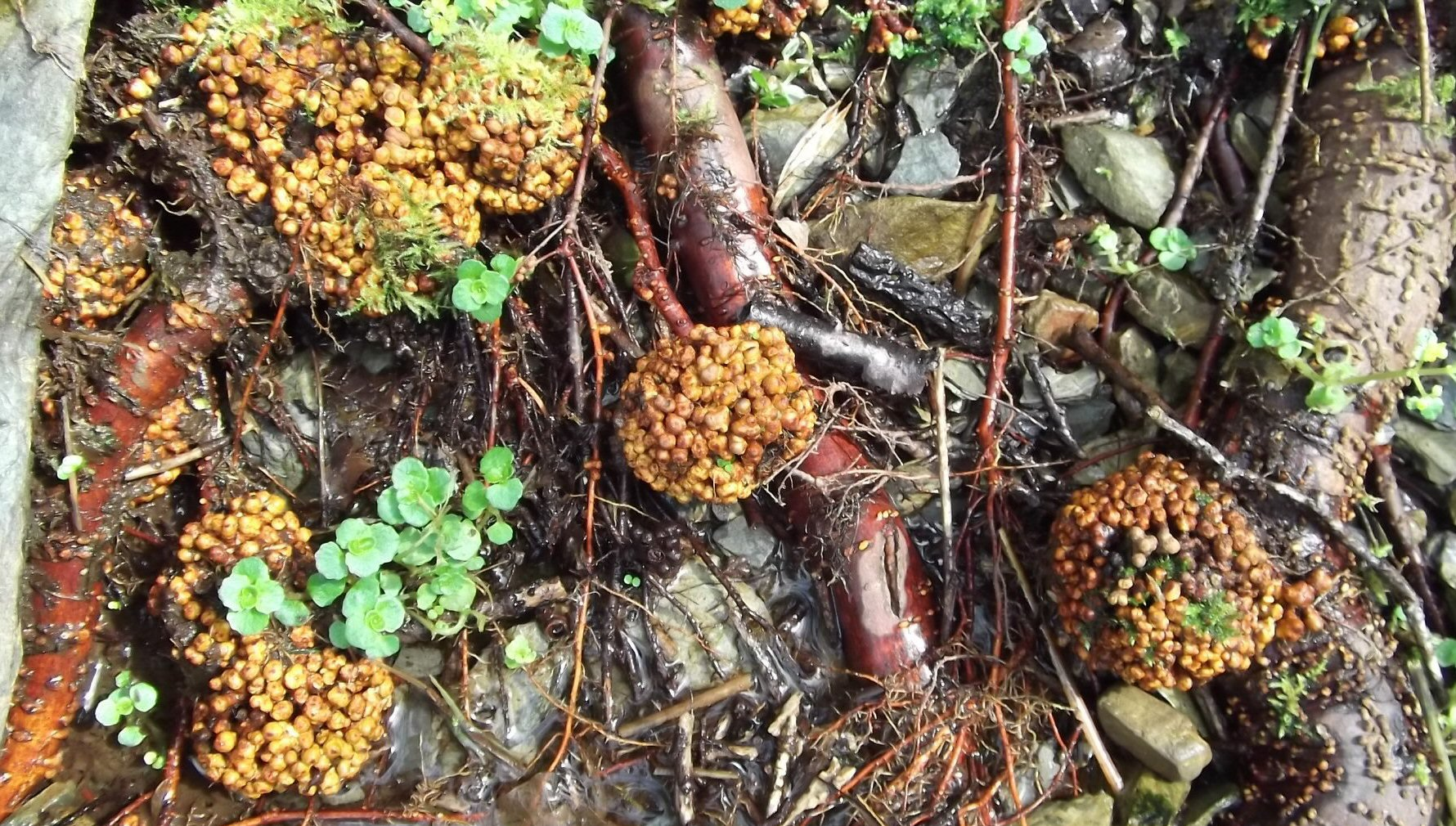
Nodules on the roots caused by Frankia alni

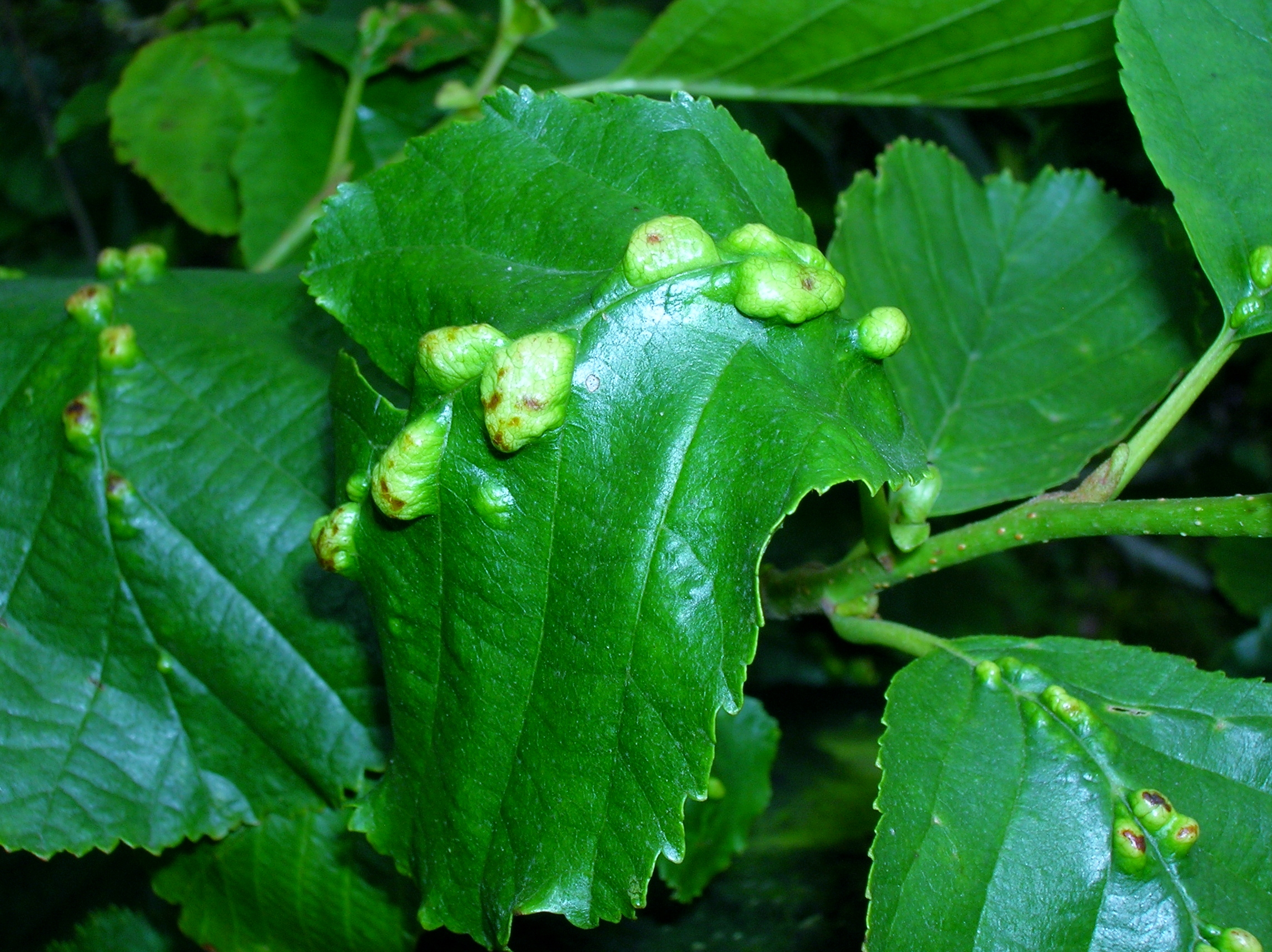
Galls on the leaves caused by the mite Eriophyes inangulis

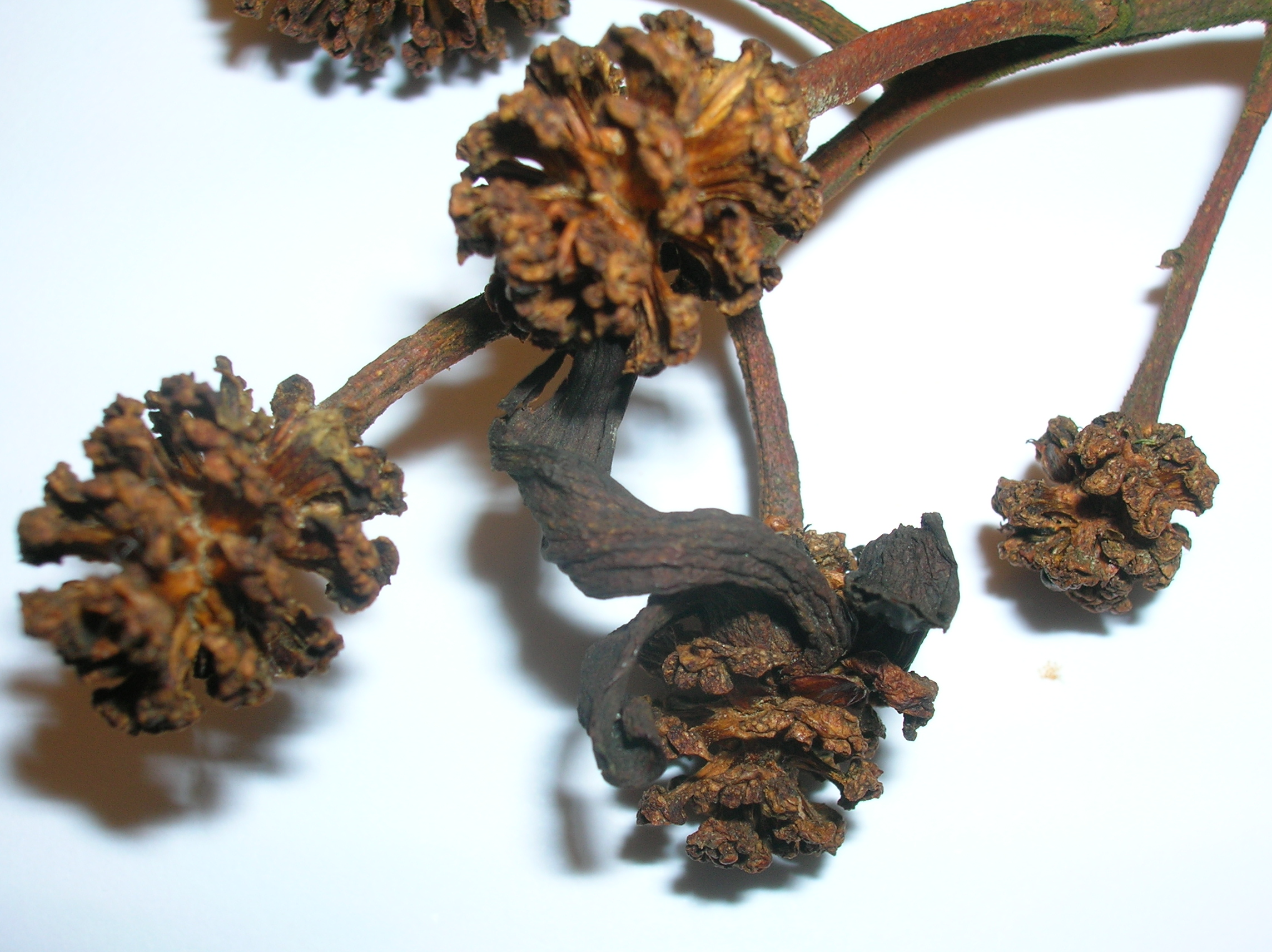
Alder tongue gall (Taphrina alni)

The common alder is most noted for its symbiotic relationship with the bacterium Frankia alni, which forms nodules on the tree's roots. This bacterium absorbs nitrogen from the air and fixes it in a form available to the tree. In return, the bacterium receives carbon products produced by the tree through photosynthesis. This relationship, which improves the fertility of the soil, has established the common alder as an important pioneer species in ecological succession.

The common alder is susceptible to Phytophthora alni, a recently evolved species of oomycete plant pathogen probably of hybrid origin. This is the causal agent of phytophthora disease of alder which is causing extensive mortality of the trees in some parts of Europe. The symptoms of this infection include the death of roots and of patches of bark, dark spots near the base of the trunk, yellowing of leaves and in subsequent years, the death of branches and sometimes the whole tree. Taphrina alni is a fungal plant pathogen that causes alder tongue gall, a chemically induced distortion of female catkins. The gall develops on the maturing fruits and produces spores which are carried by the wind to other trees. This gall is believed to be harmless to the tree. Another, also harmless, gall is caused by a midge, Eriophyes inangulis, which sucks sap from the leaves forming pustules.

The common alder is important to wildlife all year round and the seeds are a useful winter food for birds. Deer, hares and rabbits feed on the tree, and it provides shelter for pheasants. It shades the water of rivers and streams, moderating the water temperature, and this benefits fish which also find safety among its exposed roots in times of flood. The common alder is the foodplant of the larvae of a number of different butterflies and moths and is associated with over 140 species of plant-eating insect. The tree is also a host to a variety of mosses and lichens which particularly flourish in the humid moist environment of streamside trees. Some common lichens found growing on the trunk and branches include tree lungwort (Lobaria pulmonaria), Menneguzzia terebrata and Stenocybe pullatula, the last of which is restricted to alders. Some 47 species of mycorrhizal fungi have been found growing in symbiosis with the common alder, both partners benefiting from an exchange of nutrients. As well as several species of Naucoria, these symbionts include Russula alnetorum, the milkcaps Lactarius obscuratus and Lactarius cyathula, and the alder roll-rim Paxillus filamentosus, all of which grow nowhere else except in association with alders. In spring, the catkin cup Ciboria amentacea grows on fallen alder catkins.

As an introduced species, the common alder can affect the ecology of its new locality. It is a fast-growing tree and can quickly form dense woods where little light reaches the ground, and this may inhibit the growth of native plants. The presence of the nitrogen-fixing bacteria and the annual accumulation of leaf litter from the trees also alters the nutrient status of the soil. It also increases the availability of phosphorus in the ground, and the tree's dense network of roots can cause increased sedimentation in pools and waterways. It spreads easily by wind-borne seed, may be dispersed to a certain extent by birds and the woody fruits can float away from the parent tree. When the tree is felled, regrowth occurs from the stump, and logs and fallen branches can take root. In the Midwestern United States, Alnus glutinosa is a highly invasive terrestrial plant and is prohibited in Indiana. A. glutinosa is classed as an environmental weed in New Zealand.

== Toxicity ==
Pollen from the common alder, along with that from birch and hazel, is one of the many sources of tree pollen allergy. As pollen is often present in the atmosphere at the same time as that of hazel, hornbeam and oak, and they have similar physicochemical properties, it is difficult to separate out their individual effects. In central Europe, these tree pollens are the second most common cause of allergic conditions after grass pollen.

== Uses ==
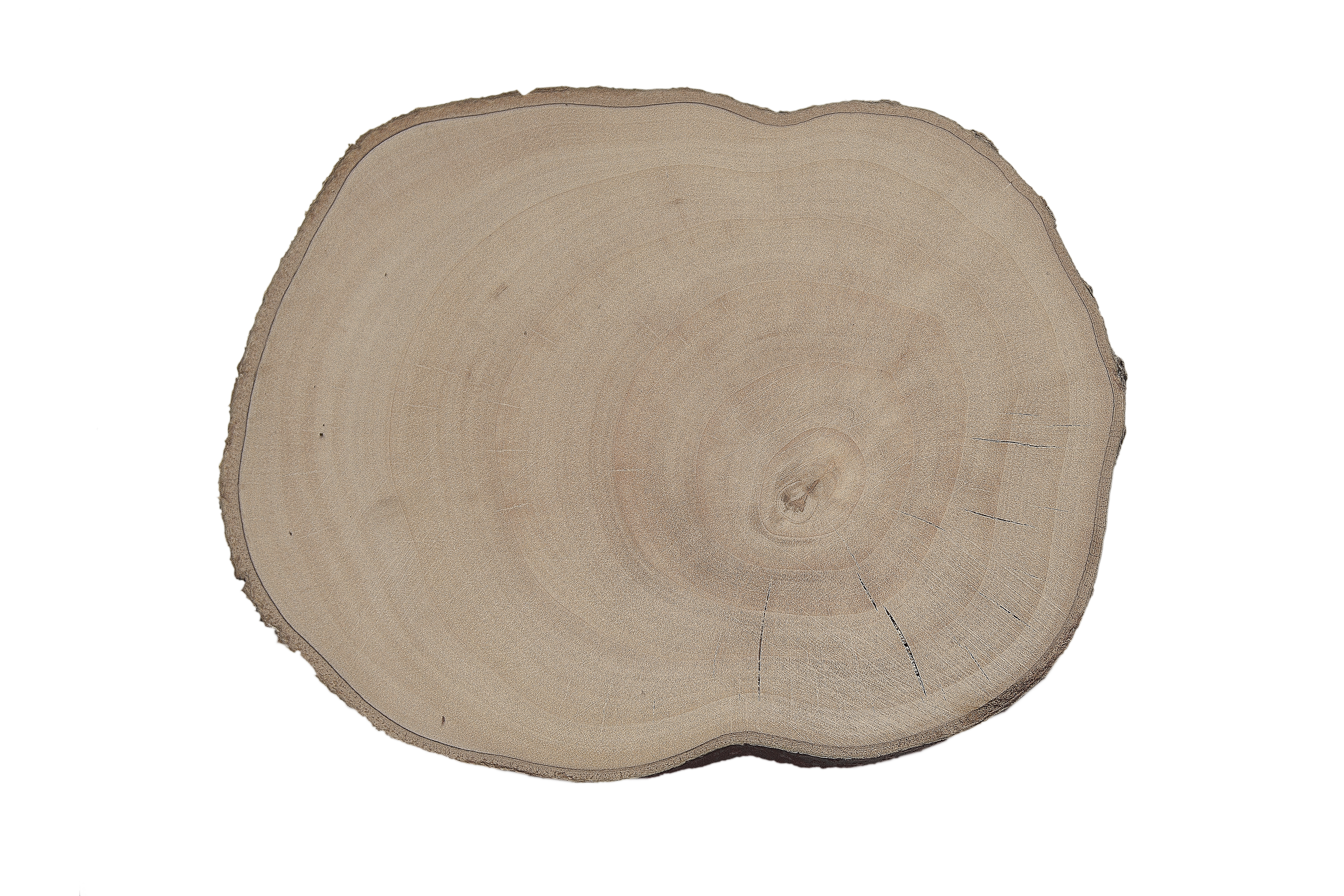
Alnus glutinosa (MHNT)

The common alder is used as a pioneer species and to stabilise river banks, to assist in flood control, to purify water in waterlogged soils and to moderate the temperature and nutrient status of water bodies. It can be grown by itself or in mixed species plantations, and the nitrogen-rich leaves falling to the ground enrich the soil and increase the production of such trees as walnut, Douglas-fir and poplar on poor quality soils. Although the tree can live for up to 160 years, it is best felled for timber at 60 to 70 years before heart rot sets in.

On marshy ground it is important as coppice-wood, being cut near the base to encourage the production of straight poles. It is capable of enduring clipping as well as marine climatic conditions and may be cultivated as a fast-growing windbreak. In woodland natural regeneration is not possible as the seeds need sufficient nutrients, water and light to germinate. Such conditions are rarely found at the forest floor and as the forest matures, the alder trees in it die out. The species is cultivated as a specimen tree in parks and gardens, and the cultivar 'Imperialis' has gained the Royal Horticultural Society's Award of Garden Merit.

=== Timber ===
The wood is soft, white when first cut, turning to pale red; the knots are attractively mottled. The timber is not used where strength is required in the construction industry, but is used for paper-making, the manufacture of fibreboard and the production of energy. Under water the wood is very durable and is used for deep foundations of buildings. The piles beneath the Rialto in Venice, and the foundations of several medieval cathedrals are made of alder. The Roman architect Vitruvius mentioned that the timber was used in the construction of the causeways across the Ravenna marshes. The wood is used in joinery, both as solid timber and as veneer, where its grain and colour are appreciated, and it takes dye well. As the wood is soft, flexible and somewhat light, it can be easily worked as well as split. It is also valued in turnery, carving, furniture making, window frames, clogs, toys, blocks, pencils and bowls.

Alder wood is relatively lightweight, easy to work and sand, accepts glue, stain, paint and finish very well and is inexpensive. All this has made it a favourite of large factories mass producing instruments.

=== Tanning and dyeing ===
The bark of the common alder has long been used in tanning and dyeing. The bark and twigs contain 16 to 20% tannic acid but their usefulness in tanning is limited by the strong accompanying colour they produce. Depending on the mordant and the methods used, various shades of brown, fawn, and yellowish-orange hues can be imparted to wool, cotton and silk. Alder bark can also be used with iron sulphate to create a black dye which can substitute for the use of sumach or galls. The Laplanders are said to chew the bark and use their saliva to dye leather. The shoots of the common alder produce a yellowish or cinnamon-coloured dye if cut early in the year. Other parts of the tree are also used in dyeing; the catkins can yield a green colour and the fresh-cut wood a pinkish-fawn colour.

=== Medicine ===
The bark of common alder has traditionally been used as an astringent, a cathartic, a hemostatic, a febrifuge, a tonic and a restorative (a substance able to restore normal health). A decoction of the bark has been used to treat swelling, inflammation and rheumatism, as an emetic, and to treat pharyngitis and sore throat. Ground up bark has been used as an ingredient in toothpaste, and the inner bark can be boiled in vinegar to provide a skin wash for treating dermatitis, lice and scabies. The leaves have been used to reduce breast discomfort in nursing mothers and folk remedies advocate the use of the leaves against various forms of cancer. Alpine farmers are said to use the leaves to alleviate rheumatism by placing a heated bag full of leaves on the affected areas. Alder leaves are consumed by cows, sheep, goats and horses though pigs refuse to eat them. According to some people, consumption of alder leaves causes blackening of the tongue and is harmful to horses.

In a research study, extracts from the seeds of the common alder have been found to be active against all the eight pathogenic bacteria against which they were tested, which included Escherichia coli and methicillin-resistant Staphylococcus aureus (MRSA). The only extract to have significant antioxidant activity was that extracted in methanol. All extracts were of low toxicity to brine shrimps. These results suggest that the seeds could be further investigated for use in the development of possible anti-MRSA drugs.

=== Other uses ===
It is also the traditional wood that is burnt to produce smoked fish and other smoked foods, though in some areas other woods are now more often used. It supplies high quality charcoal.

The leaves of this tree are sticky and if they are spread on the floor of a room, their adhesive surface is said to trap fleas.

Chemical constituents of Alnus glutinosa include hirsutanonol, oregonin, genkwanin, rhododendrin {3-(4-hydroxyphenyl)-l-methylpropyl-β-D-glucopyranoside} and (penta-2,3-dienedioic acid).

Alnus glutinosa is planted on semi-coke dumps as part of environmental restoration projects because it encourages other plants to grow.
