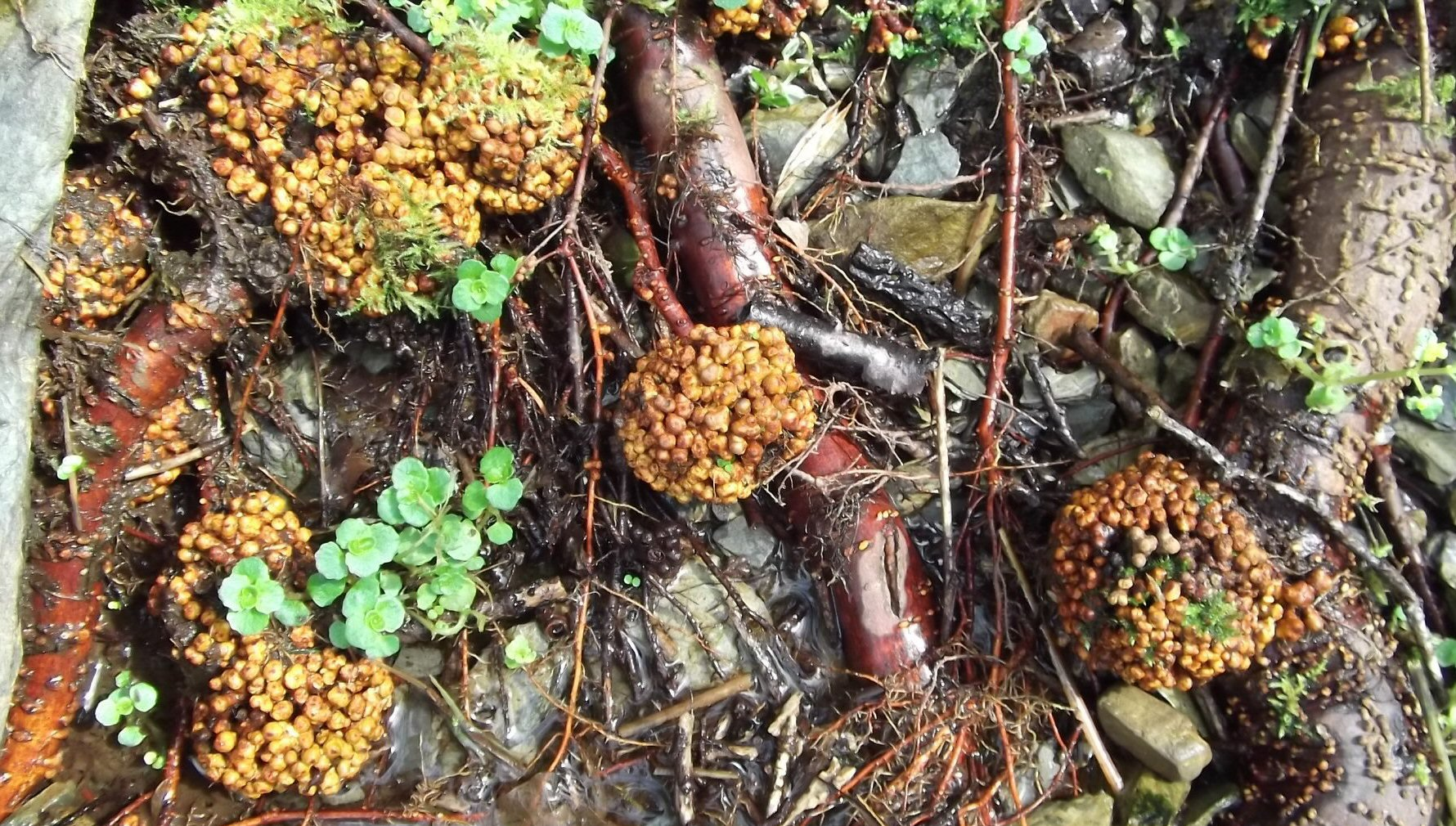
- Nodules caused by Frankia alni on roots of common alder Alnus glutinosa

Scientific classification
- Domain: Bacteria
- Kingdom: Bacillati
- Phylum: Actinomycetota
- Class: Actinomycetia
- Order: Frankiales
- Family: Frankiaceae
- Genus: Frankia
- Species: F. alni

Binomial name
- Frankia alni (Woronin 1866) Von Tubeuf 1895

Synonyms
- Actinomyces alni (Woronin 1866) von Plotho 1941; Aktinomyces alni (Woronin 1866) Peklo 1910; Entorrhiza alni (Woronin 1866) Weber 1884; Frankia subtilis Brunchorst 1886; Frankiella alni (Woronin 1866) Maire and Tison 1909; Nocardia alni (Woronin 1866) Waksman 1941; Plasmodiophora alni (Woronin 1866) Möller 1885; Proactinomyces alni (Woronin 1866) Krasil'nikov 1949; Schinzia alni Woronin 1866; Streptomyces alni (Woronin 1866) Fiuczek 1959

= Frankia alni =

Species of bacterium

Frankia alni is a Gram-positive species of actinomycete filamentous bacterium that lives in symbiosis with actinorhizal plants in the genus Alnus. It is a nitrogen-fixing bacterium and forms nodules on the roots of alder trees.

== Distribution ==
Frankia alni forms a symbiotic relationship exclusively with trees in the genus Alnus. These are widely distributed in temperate regions of the northern hemisphere. One species, Alnus glutinosa, is also found in Africa and another, the Andean alder, Alnus acuminata, extends down the mountainous spine of Central and South America as far as Argentina. Evidence suggests that this alder may have been exploited by the Incas and used to increase soil fertility and stabilize terrace soils in their upland farming systems. Actinomycetota, like Frankia alni, need a flagellum to be mobile, but F. alni does not have one, and is immobile. Alnus species grow in a wide range of habitats that include glacial till, sand hills, the banks of water courses, bogs, dry volcanic lava flows and ash alluvium.

== Infection process ==
The first symptom of infection by Frankia alni is a branching and curling of the root hairs of the alder as the bacterium moves in. The bacterium becomes encapsulated with a material derived from the plant cell wall and remains outside the host's cell membrane. The encapsulation membrane contains pectin, cellulose and hemicellulose. Cell division is stimulated in the hypodermis and cortex, which leads to the formation of a "prenodule". The bacterium then migrates into the cortex of the root while the nodule continues to develop in the same way as a lateral root. Nodule lobe primordia develop in the pericycle, endodermis or cortex during the development of the prenodule and finally the bacterium enters the cells of these to infect the new nodule.

== Nitrogen fixation ==
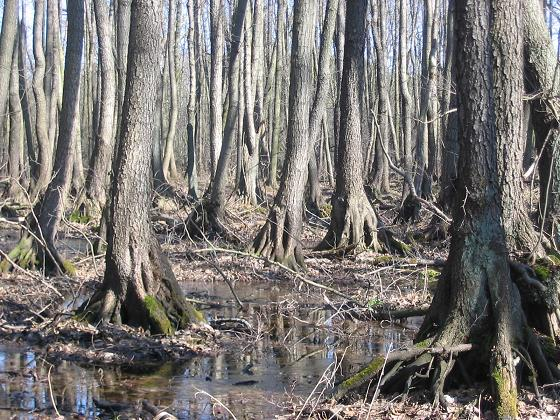
Common alder, Alnus glutinosa

In nitrogen-free culture and often in symbiosis, Frankia alni bacteria surround themselves in "vesicles". These are roughly spherical cellular structures that measure two to six millimetres in diameter and have a laminated lipid envelope. The vesicles serve to limit the diffusion of oxygen, thus assisting the reduction process that is catalysed by the enzyme nitrogenase. This enzyme bonds each atom of nitrogen to three hydrogen atoms, forming ammonia (NH_{3}). The energy for the reaction is provided by the hydrolysis of Adenosine triphosphate (ATP). Two other enzymes are also involved in the process, glutamine synthetase and glutamate synthase. The final product of the reactions is glutamate, which is thus normally the most abundant free amino acid in the cell cytoplasm. A by-product of the process is gaseous hydrogen, one molecule of which is produced for every molecule of nitrogen reduced to ammonia, but the bacterium also contains the enzyme hydrogenase, which serves to prevent some of this energy being wasted. In the process, ATP is recovered and oxygen molecules serve as the final electron acceptor in the reaction, leading to the lowering of ambient oxygen levels. This is to the benefit of the nitrogenases, which only function anaerobically.

As a result of their mutually beneficial relationship with Frankia, alder trees improve the fertility of the soils in which they grow and are considered to be a pioneer species, making the soil more fertile and thus enabling other successional species to become established.

== Dispersal ==
In culture and in some root nodules, multilocular sporangia containing many spores are produced. The sporangia are non-motile but the spores can migrate to infect new host plants. A Swedish study found that root nodules developed on transplanted seedlings of the grey alder, Alnus incana, planted in meadow soil that had not grown actinorhizal plants for nearly sixty years. A similar experiment planting seedlings in deep layers of peat where the surface layer had been removed, did not produce nodulation. This seems to have been because there were no infective propagules of Frankia alni deep in the peat. No air-borne dispersal of Frankia alni was detected and it was thought that movement of water might account for the dispersal of the bacteria in peat soils.
