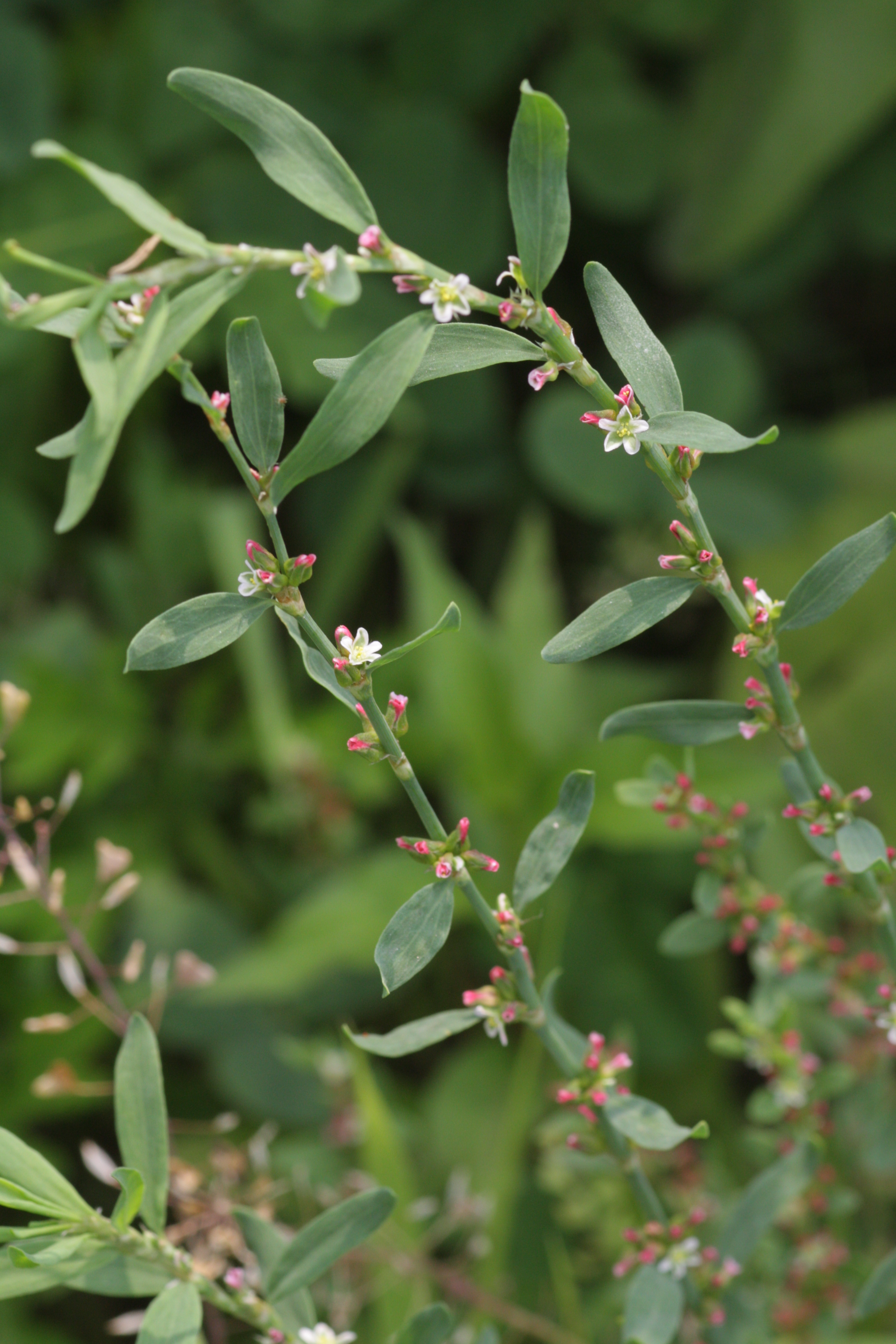

Conservation status
- Least Concern (IUCN 3.1) (Europe regional assessment)

- Secure (NatureServe)

Scientific classification
- Kingdom: Plantae
- Clade: Tracheophytes
- Clade: Angiosperms
- Clade: Eudicots
- Order: Caryophyllales
- Family: Polygonaceae
- Genus: Polygonum
- Species: P. aviculare

Binomial name
- Polygonum aviculare L. 1753

Synonyms
- Synonymy: Avicularia vulgaris Didr.; Centinodium axillare Montandon; Polygonum agreste Sumner, non Polygonum agreste Sumnev.; Polygonum aphyllum Krock.; Polygonum araraticum Kom.; Polygonum berteroi Phil.; Polygonum buxiforme Small; Polygonum ganderbalense Munshi & Javeid; Polygonum heterophyllum Lindm.; Polygonum monspeliense Thiéb.-Bern. ex Pers.; Polygonum neglectum Besser; Polygonum planum Skvortsov; Polygonum polyneuron Franch. & Sav.; Polygonum prostratum Skvortsov; Polygonum procumbens Gilib.; Polygonum retinerve Vorosch.; Polygonum rubescens Small; Polygonum scythicum Klokov; Polygonum striatum K. Koch; Polygonum uruguense H. Gross; Polygonum argenteum Ehrenb. ex Meisn.; Polygonum argenteum Skvortsov; Polygonum fusco-ochreatum Kom.; Polygonum stans Kitag.

= Polygonum aviculare =

Common knotgrass

Species of plant

Polygonum aviculare or common knotgrass is a plant related to buckwheat and dock. It is also called prostrate knotweed, birdweed, pigweed and lowgrass. It is an annual found in fields and wasteland, with white flowers from June to October. It is widespread across many countries in temperate regions, apparently native to Eurasia, naturalized in temperate parts of the Southern Hemisphere.

== Description ==
Common knotgrass is an annual, low-prostrate herb with semi-erect, branching stems, which forms patches up to about 2 m (6 ft 7 in) across as it matures. It has alternate linear-lanceolate leaves which are longer (7–15 mm (0.28–0.59 in)) on the main stems than on the branches (3–5 mm (0.12–0.20 in)). The whole plant is hairless and green, although it may appear mealy due to a powdery mildew, which can give the leaves a whitish appearance. The leaves fall early, especially on the main stem. The leaf stalks (petioles) are up to 5 mm (0.20 in) long or sometimes absent. Above each leaf there is an ochrea, which is a translucent papery stipule that surrounds the stem.

The inflorescences occur in the leaf axils and consist of a group of 1-6 flowers, each on a very short (1 mm) stalk (pedicel). The flowers are green with white or pink margins, ranging in size from 2 to 4.5 mm. Each flower has five overlapping perianth segments, fused into a cup for about a third of their length, with 8 stamens and 3 carpels.

The fruit is a dark brown nut 1.5 - 3.5 mm long with 3 concave sides and a dull, leathery sheen. When ripe it is enclosed in the perianth. The seeds need light to germinate which is why this plant appears in disturbed soil in locations where its seeds may have lain dormant for years.

== Taxonomy ==
The name "Polygonum" comes from the Ancient Greek for "many knees", in reference to the prominent joints (nodes) along the stem. The specific epithet "aviculare" means "little bird", possibly because the fruits resemble a bird's beak or an egg. Common names include birdweed, pigweed and lowgrass.

Polygonum aviculare has a wide distribution as an arable weed and plant of fields, shingle, sand, roadsides, yards and waste places. There is much morphological variation among different populations and several different sub-species are recognized:

- Polygonum aviculare subsp. aviculare – very widespread
- Polygonum aviculare subsp. boreale (Lange) Karlsson – Greenland, Labrador, Newfoundland, Scandinavia
- Polygonum aviculare subsp. buxiforme (Small) Costea & Tardif – North America
- Polygonum aviculare subsp. depressum (Meisn.) Arcang. – Europe, North America
- Polygonum aviculare var. fusco-ochreatum (Kom.) A.J.Li – northeastern China, Russian Far East
- Polygonum aviculare subsp. neglectum (Besser) Arcangeli – Europe, North America
- Polygonum aviculare subsp. rurivagum (Jord. ex Boreau) Berher – Europe, North America

== Distribution ==
Polygonum aviculare is native to Eurasia, but has become a widespread invasive worldwide.

== Habitat ==
It is common on roadsides and arable ground in the British Isles.

== Ecology ==
The ecological requirements of this species are fairly modest. Its Ellenberg values in Britain are L = 7, F = 5, R = 6, N = 7, and S = 0, which shows that it prefers average light, moisture and fertility, neutral pH and non-saline conditions. However, it can be found on beaches so it must be tolerant of occasional immersion in seawater. Many species of insects feed on knotgrass, including the eponymous Knot Grass moth, Acronicta rumicis, whose larvae are phytophagous on the leaves. The UK's Database of Insects and their Food Plants lists 113 species which are known to feed on this plant in Britain, of which 10 are beetles, 2 are flies, 8 are Hemiptera (bugs and aphids), and the remaining 93 Lepidoptera (butterflies and moths).

== Chemistry ==
Polygonum aviculare contains the flavonols avicularin, myricitrin and juglanin. The flavonoids astragalin and betmidin, and the lignan aviculin have also been found. The diterpene alkaloid panicudine is another known component.

== Fossil record ==
One fossil fruit of Polygonum aviculare has been extracted from borehole samples of the Middle Miocene fresh water deposits in Nowy Sacz Basin, West Carpathians, Poland.

== Cuisine ==
It formed a traditional ingredient in porridge consumed by Germanic peoples of western Europe, and has been found in numerous autopsies of peat bodies, including the Tollund Man.
