= Juglanin =

Names
- IUPAC name 3-(α-L-Arabinofuranosyloxy)-4′,5,7-trihydroxyflavone
- Systematic IUPAC name 3-{[(2S,3R,4R,5S)-3,4-Dihydroxy-5-(hydroxymethyl)oxolan-2-yl]oxy}-5,7-dihydroxy-2-(4-hydroxyphenyl)-4H-1-benzopyran-4-one
- Other names Kaempferol 3-O-arabinoside; 5,7,4'-Trihydroxyflavone 3-alpha-L-arabinofuranoside; Euglanin

Identifiers
CAS Number	5041-67-8
3D model (JSmol)	Interactive image
ChEBI	CHEBI:167534
ChEMBL	ChEMBL469440
ChemSpider	10365524
PubChem CID	5318717
UNII	A6TZV8UD2K
CompTox Dashboard (EPA)	DTXSID20964670
- InChI: InChI=1S/C20H18O10/c21-7-13-15(25)17(27)20(29-13)30-19-16(26)14-11(24)5-10(23)6-12(14)28-18(19)8-1-3-9(22)4-2-8/h1-6,13,15,17,20-25,27H,7H2/t13-,15-,17+,20-/m0/s1 Key: POQICXMTUPVZMX-UXYNSRGZSA-N
- SMILES: OCC(O1)C(O)C(O)C1OC(C(=O)2)=C(c(c4)ccc(O)c4)Oc(c3)c(c(O)cc(O)3)2

Properties
Chemical formula	C_{20}H_{18}O_{10}
Molar mass	418.35 g/mol
- Except where otherwise noted, data are given for materials in their standard state (at 25 °C [77 °F], 100 kPa). Infobox references

Juglanin is a flavonol found in Polygonum aviculare.

== See also ==
- Juglanin A, juglanin B and juglanin C, diarylheptanoids found in several species in the genus Juglans
