= Aviculin =

Names
- IUPAC name [(1S,2R,3R)-7-Hydroxy-1-(4-hydroxy-3-methoxyphenyl)-3-(hydroxymethyl)-6-methoxy-1,2,3,4-tetrahydronaphthalen-2-yl]methyl α-L-rhamnopyranoside
- Systematic IUPAC name (2R,3R,4R,5R,6S)-2-{[(1S,2R,3R)-7-Hydroxy-1-(4-hydroxy-3-methoxyphenyl)-3-(hydroxymethyl)-6-methoxy-1,2,3,4-tetrahydronaphthalen-2-yl]methoxy}-6-methyloxane-3,4,5-triol
- Other names isolariciresinol-9'-rhamnopyranoside

Identifiers
| CAS Number | 156765-33-2 |
| 3D model (JSmol) | Interactive image |
| ChEMBL | ChEMBL2332673 |
| ChemSpider | 8566919 |
| PubChem CID | 10391477 |
| CompTox Dashboard (EPA) | DTXSID901045608 |
- InChI: InChI=1S/C26H34O10/c1-12-23(30)24(31)25(32)26(36-12)35-11-17-15(10-27)6-14-8-21(34-3)19(29)9-16(14)22(17)13-4-5-18(28)20(7-13)33-2/h4-5,7-9,12,15,17,22-32H,6,10-11H2,1-3H3/t12-,15-,17-,22-,23-,24+,25+,26+/m0/s1 Key: FPJFPMQEUVMUKU-CDDCGRQRSA-N
- SMILES: C[C@H]1[C@@H]([C@H]([C@H]([C@@H](O1)OC[C@H]2[C@@H](CC3=CC(=C(C=C3[C@@H]2C4=CC(=C(C=C4)O)OC)O)OC)CO)O)O)O

Properties
| Chemical formula | C_{26}H_{34}O_{10} |
| Molar mass | 506.54 g/mol |
- Except where otherwise noted, data are given for materials in their standard state (at 25 °C [77 °F], 100 kPa). Infobox references

Aviculin is a lignan glycoside that inhibits cancer cells. It is bio-active isolate of Pseudocydonia sinensis or Polygonum aviculare.
