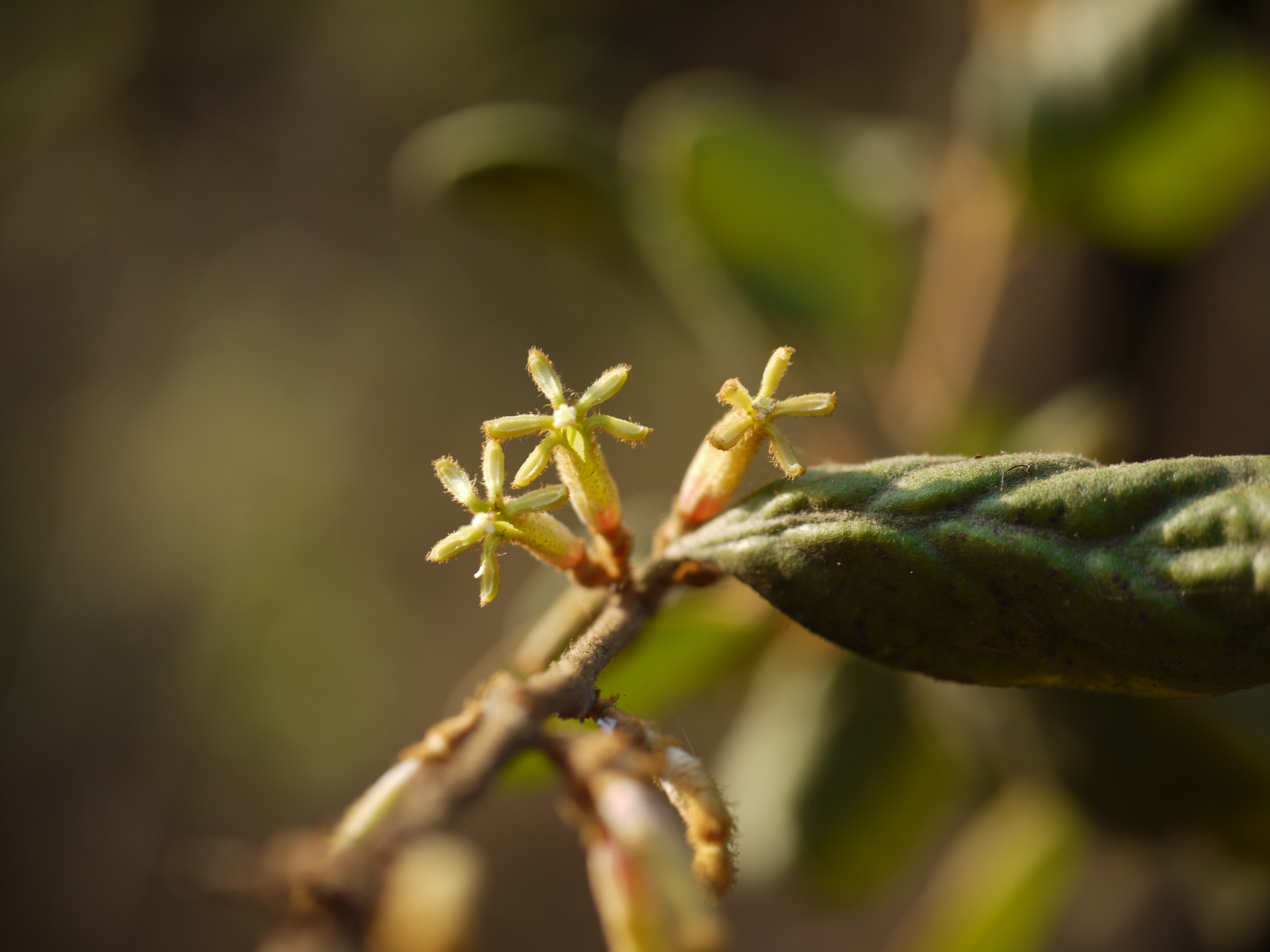
- T. tomentosus

Scientific classification
- Kingdom: Plantae
- Clade: Tracheophytes
- Clade: Angiosperms
- Clade: Eudicots
- Order: Santalales
- Family: Loranthaceae
- Genus: Taxillus; Tiegh.

Species
- See text

= Taxillus =

Genus of mistletoes

Taxillus（Chinese : 桑寄生） is a plant genus in the mistletoe family: Loranthaceae.

== Species ==
- Taxillus assamicus Danser
- Taxillus balansae (Lecomte) Danser
- Taxillus baviensis Bân
- Taxillus bracteatus Van Tiegh.
- Taxillus caloreas (Diels) Danser
- Taxillus chinensis (DC.) Danser
- Taxillus delavayi (Tiegh.) Danser
- Taxillus kaempferi (DC.) Danser
- Taxillus levinei (Merr.) H.S. Kiu
- Taxillus limprichtii (Grüning) H.S. Kiu
- Taxillus liquidambaricola (Hayata) Hosok.
- Taxillus nigrans (Hance) Danser
- Taxillus pseudochinensis (Yamam.) Danser
- Taxillus renii H. S. Kiu
- Taxillus sclerophyllus (Thw.) Danser
- Taxillus sutchuenensis (Lecomte) Danser
  - Taxillus sutchuenensis var. duclouxii
- Taxillus theifer (Hayata) H.S. Kiu
- Taxillus thibetensis (Lecomte) Danser
- Taxillus tomentosus Tiegh.
- Taxillus tsaii S.T. Chiu
- Taxillus umbellifer (Schult. f.) Danser
- Taxillus vestitus (Wall.) Danser
- Taxillus wiensii Balle ex Polhill
- Taxillus yadoriki (Maxim.) Danser
- Taxillus zenii H.S. Kiu

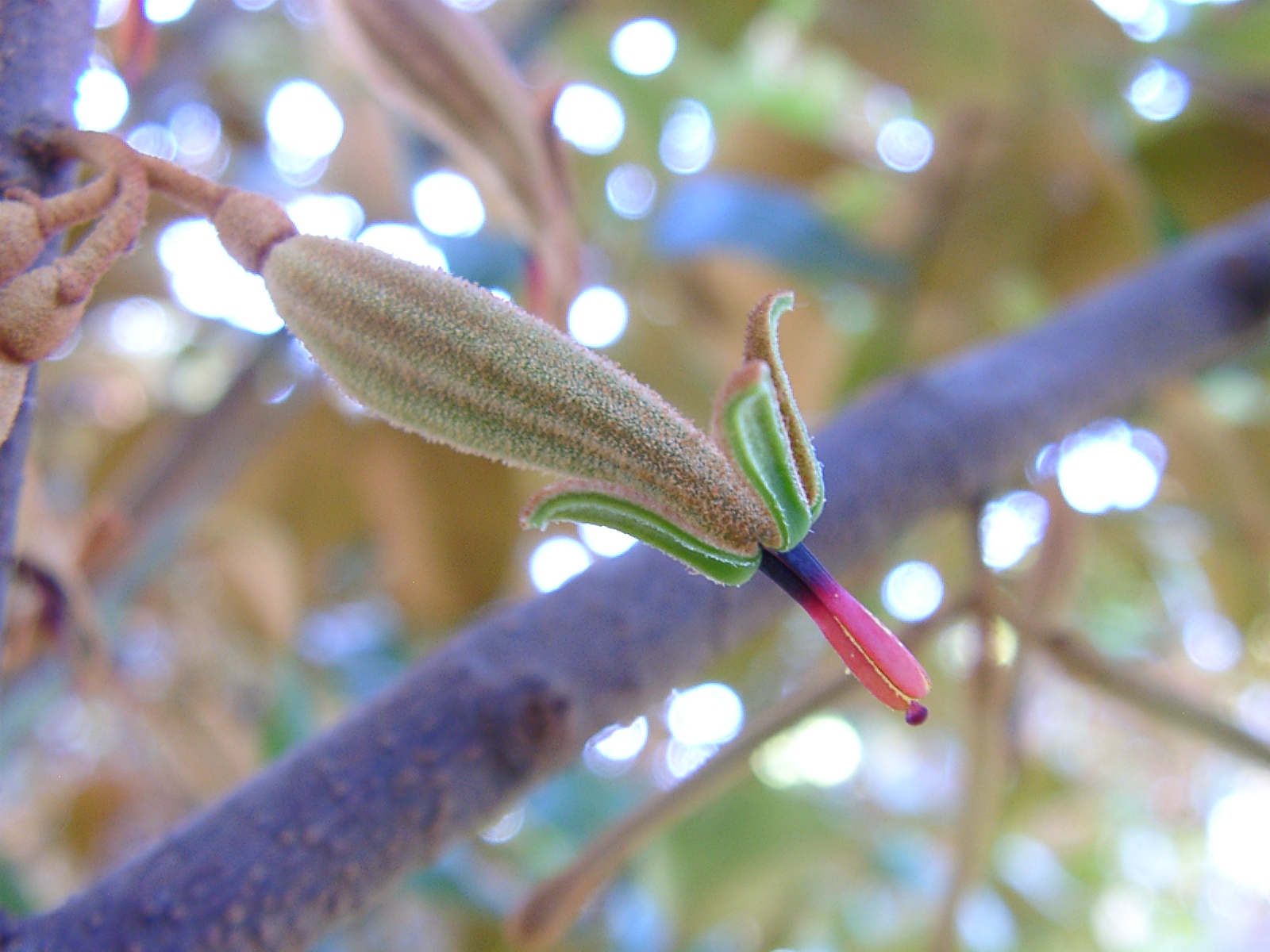
T. yadoriki (synonym Scurrula yadoriki)
