= Taxillusin =

Names
- IUPAC name (2R,3R)-3′,4′,5,7-Tetrahydroxy-4-oxoflavan-3-yl β-D-glucopyranoside 6-(3,4,5-trihydroxybenzoate)
- Systematic IUPAC name [(2R,3S,4S,5R,6S)-6-{[(2R,3R)-2-(3,4-Dihydroxymethyl)-5,7-dihydroxy-4-oxo-2,3-dihydro-2H-1-benzopyran-3-yl]oxy}-3,4,5-trihydroxyoxan-2-yl]methyl 3,4,5-trihydroxybenzoate

Identifiers
CAS Number	66656-93-7
3D model (JSmol)	Interactive image
ChemSpider	10306084
PubChem CID	14406832
CompTox Dashboard (EPA)	DTXSID501031415
- InChI: InChI=1S/C28H26O16/c29-11-6-14(32)19-17(7-11)42-25(9-1-2-12(30)13(31)3-9)26(22(19)37)44-28-24(39)23(38)21(36)18(43-28)8-41-27(40)10-4-15(33)20(35)16(34)5-10/h1-7,18,21,23-26,28-36,38-39H,8H2/t18-,21-,23+,24-,25-,26+,28+/m1/s1 Key: XUJNKPZDIVKHBE-GKOVUGPKSA-N; InChI=1/C28H26O16/c29-11-6-14(32)19-17(7-11)42-25(9-1-2-12(30)13(31)3-9)26(22(19)37)44-28-24(39)23(38)21(36)18(43-28)8-41-27(40)10-4-15(33)20(35)16(34)5-10/h1-7,18,21,23-26,28-36,38-39H,8H2/t18-,21-,23+,24-,25-,26+,28+/m1/s1 Key: XUJNKPZDIVKHBE-GKOVUGPKBZ
- SMILES: Oc1cc(cc(O)c1O)C(=O)OC[C@H]5O[C@@H](O[C@H]2C(=O)c4c(O)cc(O)cc4O[C@@H]2c3ccc(O)c(O)c3)[C@H](O)[C@@H](O)[C@@H]5O

Properties
Chemical formula	C_{28}H_{26}O_{16}
Molar mass	618.500 g·mol^{−1}
- Except where otherwise noted, data are given for materials in their standard state (at 25 °C [77 °F], 100 kPa). Infobox references

Taxillusin is a flavonol found in the parasitic plant Taxillus kaempferi. It is a galloylated 3-O-glucoside of quercetin.
