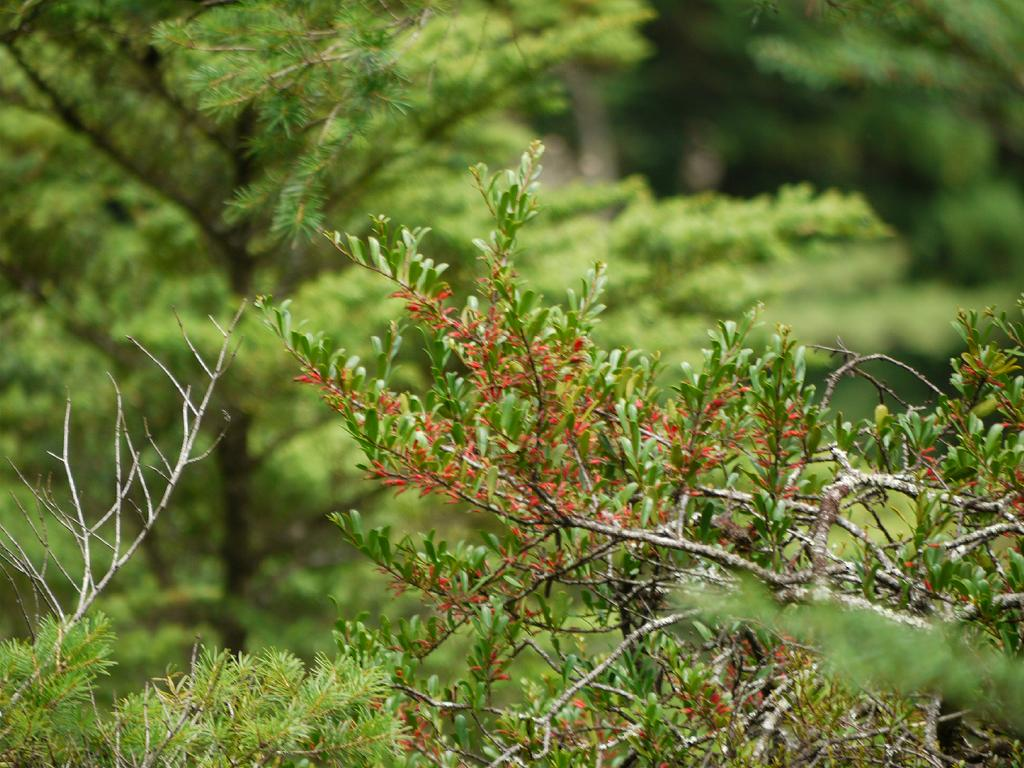

Scientific classification
- Kingdom: Plantae
- Clade: Tracheophytes
- Clade: Angiosperms
- Clade: Eudicots
- Order: Santalales
- Family: Loranthaceae
- Genus: Taxillus
- Species: T. kaempferi

Binomial name
- Taxillus kaempferi (DC.) Danser 1933

Subspecies
- Taxillus kaempferi var. grandiflorus H.S. Kiu; Taxillus kaempferi var. kaempferi

= Taxillus kaempferi =

Species of mistletoe

Taxillus kaempferi (Chinese: 小叶钝果寄生; pinyin: xiao ye dun guo ji sheng) is a parasitic plant species in the genus Taxillus found in China (Anhui, Fujian, W Hubei, S Jiangxi, Sichuan, S Zhejiang), Bhutan and Japan. Its host is Pinus thunbergii.

The flavonol avicularin can be produced from T. kaempferi. Other flavonoids constituents of the plant are hyperin, quercitrin and taxillusin.
