= Avicularin =

Names
- IUPAC name 3-(α-L-Arabinofuranosyloxy)-3′,4′,5,7-tetrahydroxyflavone
- Systematic IUPAC name 3-{[(2S,3R,4R,5S)-3,4-Dihydroxy-5-(hydroxymethyl)oxolan-2-yl]oxy}-2-(3,4-dihydroxyphenyl)-5,7-dihydroxy-4H-1-benzopyran-4-one
- Other names quercetin-3-O-α-L-arabinofuranoside quercetin-3-O-α-arabinofuranoside; Avicularine; Avicularoside; Fenicularin; Quercetin 3-alpha-L-arabinofuranoside

Identifiers
CAS Number	572-30-5
3D model (JSmol)	Interactive image
ChemSpider	20130086
KEGG	C22608
PubChem CID	5490064
UNII	TN38NQ38BQ
CompTox Dashboard (EPA)	DTXSID60205832
- InChI: InChI=1S/C20H18O11/c21-6-13-15(26)17(28)20(30-13)31-19-16(27)14-11(25)4-8(22)5-12(14)29-18(19)7-1-2-9(23)10(24)3-7/h1-5,13,15,17,20-26,28H,6H2/t13-,15-,17+,20-/m0/s1 Key: BDCDNTVZSILEOY-UXYNSRGZSA-N; InChI=1/C20H18O11/c21-6-13-15(26)17(28)20(30-13)31-19-16(27)14-11(25)4-8(22)5-12(14)29-18(19)7-1-2-9(23)10(24)3-7/h1-5,13,15,17,20-26,28H,6H2/t13-,15-,17+,20-/m0/s1 Key: BDCDNTVZSILEOY-UXYNSRGZBK
- SMILES: C1=CC(=C(C=C1C2=C(C(=O)C3=C(C=C(C=C3O2)O)O)O[C@H]4[C@@H]([C@H]([C@@H](O4)CO)O)O)O)O

Properties
Chemical formula	C_{20}H_{18}O_{11}
Molar mass	434.35 g/mol
- Except where otherwise noted, data are given for materials in their standard state (at 25 °C [77 °F], 100 kPa). Infobox references

Avicularin is a bio-active flavonol isolated from a number of plants including Polygonum aviculare, Rhododendron aureum and Taxillus kaempferi.

It suppresses lipid accumulation through repression of C/EBPα-activated GLUT4-mediated glucose uptake in 3T3-L1 cells.
