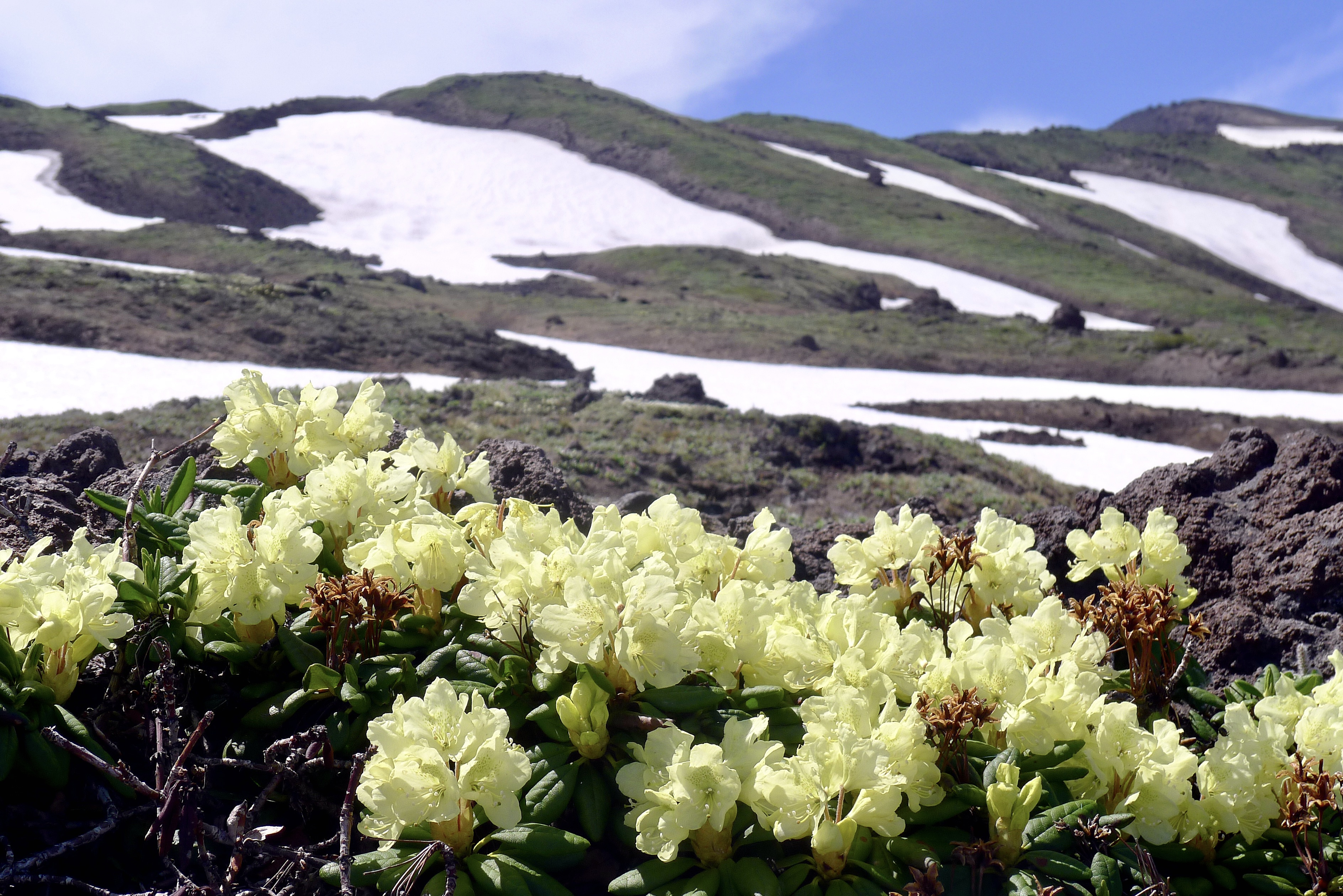
- Rhododendron aureum in Kamchatka

Scientific classification
- Kingdom: Plantae
- Clade: Embryophytes
- Clade: Tracheophytes
- Clade: Spermatophytes
- Clade: Angiosperms
- Clade: Eudicots
- Clade: Asterids
- Order: Ericales
- Family: Ericaceae
- Genus: Rhododendron
- Species: R. aureum

Binomial name
- Rhododendron aureum Georgi

= Rhododendron aureum =

Species of flowering plant

Rhododendron aureum is a flowering plant species in the genus Rhododendron. It is native to northeastern Asia, in Mongolia, northeastern China, Korea, Japan, and eastern Siberia, and is a low-growing evergreen shrub growing to one metre high. The leaves are 2.5–15 cm long and 1–6 cm broad, glabrous when mature; the flowers are pale yellow, 2.5–3 cm wide, produced in loose racemes of 5–8 together in spring. The fruit is a capsule 1 cm long.

Larvae of Boloria freija feed on Rhododendron aureum.

R. aureum produces (-)-rhododendrol, (-)-rhododendrin, avicularin and hyperoside.
