= Polygonum agreste =

Scientific classification
- Kingdom: Plantae
- Clade: Tracheophytes
- Clade: Angiosperms
- Clade: Eudicots
- Order: Caryophyllales
- Family: Polygonaceae
- Genus: Polygonum
- Species: P. agreste

Binomial name
- Polygonum agreste Sumnev.

Species of flowering plant

Polygonum agreste is a species of flowering plant in the family Polygonaceae, native to Uzbekistan. It was first described by Georgji Sumnevicz in 1940.

(Polygonum agreste Sumner is a different species, and is a synonym of Polygonum aviculare.)
