= Rhododendrin =

- Chemical structure of Rhododendrin

Names
- IUPAC name (2R)-4-(4-Hydroxyphenyl)butan-2-yl β-D-glucopyranoside
- Systematic IUPAC name (2R,3S,4S,5R,6R)-2-(Hydroxymethyl)-6-{[(2R)-4-(4-hydroxyphenyl)butan-2-yl]oxy}oxane-3,4,5-triol
- Other names Betuloside (-)-Rhododendrin

Identifiers
CAS Number	497-78-9
3D model (JSmol)	Interactive image
ChEMBL	ChEMBL1086682
ChemSpider	390960
PubChem CID	442538
UNII	5I7QR8C454
CompTox Dashboard (EPA)	DTXSID80964353
- InChI: InChI=1S/C16H24O7/c1-9(2-3-10-4-6-11(18)7-5-10)22-16-15(21)14(20)13(19)12(8-17)23-16/h4-7,9,12-21H,2-3,8H2,1H3/t9-,12-,13-,14+,15-,16-/m1/s1 Key: KLLYDTMVSVIJEH-YYMOATHLSA-N
- SMILES: CC(CCC1=CC=C(C=C1)O)OC2C(C(C(C(O2)CO)O)O)O

Properties
Chemical formula	C_{16}H_{24}O_{7}
Molar mass	328.361 g·mol^{−1}
- Except where otherwise noted, data are given for materials in their standard state (at 25 °C [77 °F], 100 kPa). Infobox references

Rhododendrin (betuloside) is an arylbutanoid glycoside and a phenylpropanoid, a type of natural phenol. It can be found in the leaves of Rhododendron aureum or in Cistus salviifolius.

In vitro, it shows analgesic, anti-inflammatory and diuretic properties.
