= Panicudine =

Names
- Other names 6-Hydroxy-11-deoxy-13-dehydrohetisane; (2α)-2,6-Dihydroxyhetisan-13-one

Identifiers
CAS Number	178451-93-9
3D model (JSmol)	Interactive image
- InChI: InChI=1S/C20H25NO3/c1-9-4-18-7-20(24)16-17(2)5-10(22)6-19(16)12(18)3-11(9)14(23)13(18)15(19)21(20)8-17/h10-13,15-16,22,24H,1,3-8H2,2H3/t10-,11-,12+,13+,15?,16+,17-,18?,19-,20+/m0/s1 Key: UWHXIZAUFGDTMN-RPHVCTJRSA-N
- SMILES: O[C@@]12[C@]3([C@]45C([C@@]6(C7([C@]4(C[C@](C6=O)(C(=C)C7)[H])[H])C1)[H])[N@@]2C[C@]3(C)C[C@H](O)C5)[H]

Properties
Chemical formula	C_{20}H_{25}NO_{3}
Molar mass	327.424 g·mol^{−1}
Melting point	249–250 °C (480–482 °F; 522–523 K)
- Except where otherwise noted, data are given for materials in their standard state (at 25 °C [77 °F], 100 kPa). Infobox references

Panicudine (6-hydroxy-11-deoxy-13-dehydrohetisane) is a C_{20}-diterpene alkaloid of the hetisine type, first isolated from monkshood. It has empirical formula C_{20}H_{25}NO_{3} and a melting point of 249–250 °C. The structure was determined to be a hetisine type diterpene by noting infrared spectrum absorption bands of 3405 cm^{−1} (OH), 1718 (C=O), and 1650 (C=C), a proton magnetic resonance spectrum with "secondary hydroxy (4.02 ppm, m, 1H, W_{1/2} = 10 Hz), exomethylene (4.87 and 4.76 ppm, br.s, 1H each), and tertiary methyl (1.29 ppm, s, 3H) groups and the absence of N-methyl, N-ethyl, and methoxy groups." Additional ultraviolet spectrum and carbon-13 NMR data, confirmed by high resolution mass spectrometry, completed the determination of the structure.

Panicudine was identified as an active antimicrobial substance in the chloroform extract of Polygonum aviculare, a traditional herbal medicine of the Mediterranean coastal region. It has also been isolated from the herb Rumex pictus.

== Related compounds ==
Panicutine is the acetate ester of panicudine.

Chemical structure of panicutine

A variety of related alkaloids have been isolated from other natural sources.
