= Wine lactone =

- Chemical structure of the wine lactone

Names
- IUPAC name (3S,3aS,7aR)-3,6-Dimethyl-3a,4,5,7a-tetrahydro-3H-1-benzofuran-2-one

Identifiers
CAS Number	182699-77-0
3D model (JSmol)	Interactive image
ChemSpider	8996256
PubChem CID	10820954
UNII	PBI72OD596
CompTox Dashboard (EPA)	DTXSID401316705 DTXSID90886239, DTXSID401316705
- InChI: InChI=1S/C10H14O2/c1-6-3-4-8-7(2)10(11)12-9(8)5-6/h5,7-9H,3-4H2,1-2H3/t7-,8-,9-/m0/s1 Key: NQWBFQXRASPNLB-CIUDSAMLSA-N
- SMILES: O=C1O[C@H]2/C=C(\CC[C@H]2[C@@H]1C)C

Properties
Chemical formula	C_{10}H_{14}O_{2}
Molar mass	166.220 g·mol^{−1}
- Except where otherwise noted, data are given for materials in their standard state (at 25 °C [77 °F], 100 kPa). verify (what is ?) Infobox references

Wine lactone is a pleasant smelling compound found naturally in apples, orange juice, grapefruit juice, orange essential oil, clementine peel oil and various grape wines. It was first discovered as an essential oil metabolite in koala urine by Southwell in 1975. It was discovered several years later by Guth in white wines and was named "wine lactone". This monoterpene imparts "coconut, woody and sweet" odors to a wine. There are 8 possible isomers of wine lactone with the (3S, 3a S, 7aR) isomer being the only one that has been found in wine. This isomer is also the most potent of all eight with an odor detection threshold of 10 ng/L in model wine.

The odor threshold of the (3S,3aS,7aR)-wine lactone stereoisomer is 0.00001-0.00004 ng/L in air.
