= Rhododendrol =

Names
- IUPAC name 4-[(3R)-3-hydroxybutyl]phenol
- Other names Rhododenol, RD, 4-(4-hydroxyphenyl)-2-butanol, (-)-Betuligenol, (R)-Frambinol, 4-Hydroxy-α-methyl-benzenepropanol

Identifiers
CAS Number	501-96-2
3D model (JSmol)	Interactive image
ChEMBL	ChEMBL1086681
ChemSpider	802471
ECHA InfoCard	100.237.232
EC Number	809-359-5
PubChem CID	919205
UNII	97PTR2F3Z8
CompTox Dashboard (EPA)	DTXSID20198211
- InChI: Key: SFUCGABQOMYVJW-MRVPVSSYSA-N; InChI=1S/C10H14O2/c1-8(11)2-3-9-4-6-10(12)7-5-9/h4-8,11-12H,2-3H2,1H3/t8-/m1/s1
- SMILES: CC(CCC1=CC=C(C=C1)O)O

Properties
Chemical formula	C_{10}H_{14}O_{2}
Molar mass	166.22 g/mol
Appearance	White solid powder
Density	1.1±0.1 g/cm3
Melting point	68-71 °C
Boiling point	315.4±17.0 °C at 760 mmHg

Hazards
- Occupational safety and health (OHS/OSH)
Main hazards	cytotoxicity
- GHS labelling
Pictograms	(GHS07: Exclamation mark)
Signal word	Warning
Hazard statements	H302, H319
Precautionary statements	P270, P280, P301+P312, P305+P351+P338, P330, P337+P313, P501
Flash point	153.4±15.5 °C
- Except where otherwise noted, data are given for materials in their standard state (at 25 °C [77 °F], 100 kPa). Infobox references

Rhododendrol (RD) also called 4-[(3R)-3-hydroxybutyl]phenol (systemic name), is an organic compound with the formula C_{10}H_{14}O_{2}. It is a naturally occurring ingredient present in many plants, such as the Rhododendron. The phenolic compound was first developed in 2010 as a tyrosinase inhibitor for skin-lightening cosmetics. In 2013, after rhododendrol reportedly caused skin depigmentation in consumers using RD-containing skin-brightening cosmetics, the cosmetics were withdrawn from the market. The skin condition, caused by RD, is called RD-induced leukoderma. Rhododendrol exerts melanocyte cytotoxicity via a tyrosinase-dependent mechanism. It has been shown to impair the normal proliferation of melanocytes through reactive oxygen species-dependent activation of GADD45. It is now well established that rhododendrol is a potent tyrosinase inhibitor.

== Structure and synthesis ==
=== Structure ===
Rhododendrol occurs as the glucoside rhododendrin in leaves of the Rhododendron (Ericacae), and it naturally occurs as a phenolic compound in plants such as Acer nikoense, Betula platyphylla, and the Chinese red birch Betula Alba. The compound can be obtained from alkylation of phenols (C_{6}H_{5}OH). The molecule has a para-substituted structure, and one chiral center. Also, the compound has a natural charge.

=== Biosynthesis ===
There are several ways to synthesise rhododendrol. First, the synthesis can be achieved in six steps from benzaldehyde. The key reactions in this method include aldol condensation and trichloroacetimidate glycosylation. The compound can also be prepared by reducing raspberry ketone (4-(4-hydroxyphenyl)-2- butanone) with Raney nickel in EtOH. In addition, Rhododendrol can be synthesised from p-coumaric acid. This pathway involves reduction of the aliphatic double bond present in p-coumaric acid.

== Mechanisms of action ==
The mechanism of action of rhododendrol has been investigated in multiple studies which revealed that RD competes with tyrosine for hydroxylation by tyrosinase and interferes with melanin synthesis. First, RD is catalysed by tyrosinase to produce toxic metabolites as RD-cyclic catechol. These reactive metabolites cause damage to the melanocytes. There is still uncertainty, however, how the metabolites result in melanocyte damage.

A previous report reported that the melanocyte toxicity of rhododendrol is caused by the production of cytotoxic reactive oxygen species (ROS). However, another study stated that there was no ROS detected in the rhododendrol-treated melanocytes, but a tyrosinase-dependent accumulation of endoplasmic reticulum stress and activation of the apoptotic pathway. Even though there is still no full agreement on the exact mechanism of action, it is suggested that the mechanism of RD-induced leukoderma closely resembles the mechanism displayed in the figure below (Suggested mechanism of Rhododendrol.png).

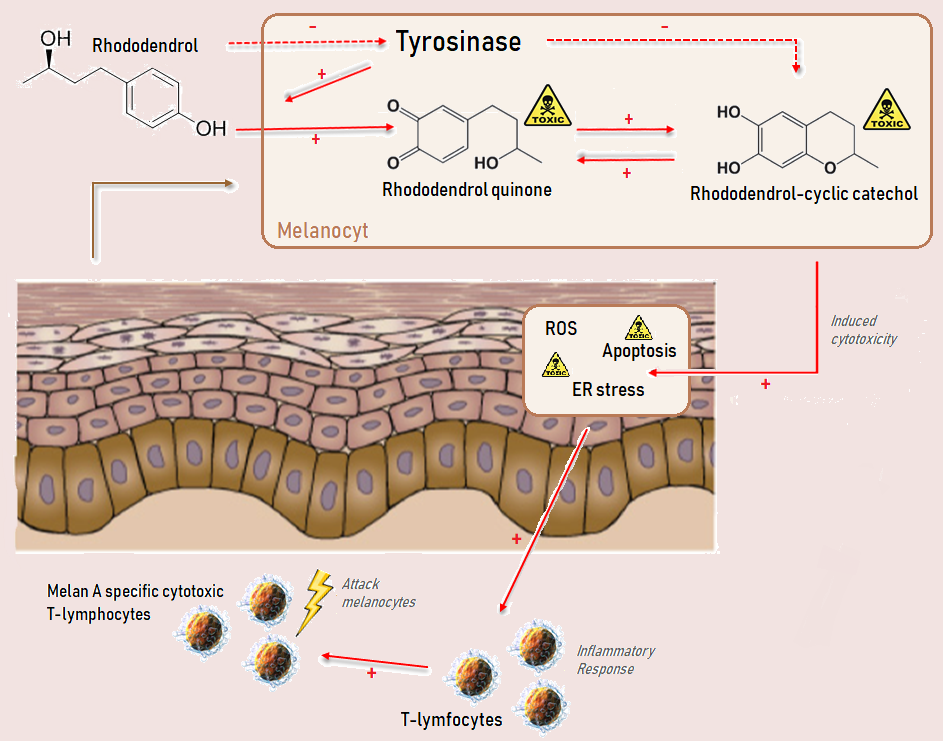
Suggested mechanism of Rhododendrol

In some individuals, a T-cell response is observed. The melanocyte cell lysates may sensitise T-cells, and the immunised cytotoxic T-lymphocytes (specific to Melan A, which is a melanocytic differentiation marker) may enhance the RD-induced leukoderma or evoke vitiligo-like lesions on the non-applied skin.

== Metabolism ==
Rhododendrol is metabolised via tyrosinase-catalysed oxidation. Therefore, the enzyme tyrosinase is necessary for the oxidation of rhododendrol. Tyrosinase regularly plays an essential role in the production of melanin called melanogenesis. After oxidation of rhododendrol by the tyrosinase enzyme, several kinds of phenols and catechols are formed. These phenols and catechols together form ortho-quinones (o-quinones). Presence of o-quinones can lead to cytotoxicity via the production of reactive oxygen species (ROS) or by the binding to enzymes or DNA.

When rhododendrol is metabolised via the tyrosinase-catalysed oxidation, RD-quinone will be formed. This formation gives rise to the formation of secondary quinones. As described in the mechanisms of action, the presence of quinones could cause cytotoxicity to melanocytes by the production of ROS or by binding to DNA and enzymes.

== Adverse effects ==
Considering the use of rhododendrol is prohibited since 2013, the knowledge about the side effects rhodendodrol causes is limited. As stated above, the main known adverse effect of rhododendrol is melanocyte toxicity. Melanocytes are melanin-producing cells, primarily responsible for skin colour. Melanocyte toxicity induces apoptosis of the cell, causing the melanocytes to die. This is due to an increased expression of caspase-3 and caspase-8. Caspase proteins are crucial mediators of apoptosis, with caspase-3 and caspase-8 being death proteases. Considering melanocytes are responsible for skin colour, apoptosis of these cells causes the colour of the skin to vanish. This disease caused by rhododendrol is called leukoderma. Leukoderma, also known as vitiligo, is a skin disease characterized by patches of the skin losing their pigment. This rhododendrol-induced depigmentation can be either long-term and short term. In most cases, repigmentation and cessation of further depigmentation occur after discontinuing the exposure to the substance. However, some patients develop vitiligo vulgaris through the spread of depigmentation into non-exposed areas. This only occurs after severe chemical damage. In addition, rhododendrol not only causes melanocytes to go into apoptosis but it also inhibits melanogenesis. Meaning that the use of rhododendrol not only causes melanocytes to die, but also prevents the development of new melanocytes.

== Toxicity ==
Various studies have shown that there is more than one mechanism by which rhododendrol can have a toxic effect. This toxic effect of rhododendrol is found in the melanocytes, which gives rise to skin depigmentation.

=== ROS ===
Rhododendrol can have a toxic effect via the production of reactive oxygen species (ROS). This will cause an impairment in the further development of melanocytes in the skin. Impairment is caused by upregulation of the GADD45 gene. A study of Kim et al. showed that the production of ROS, which gives rise to more production of GADD45, is already found at low concentrations of rhododendrol. At the time that rhododendrol was used in cosmetic products, it contained concentrations of 2%. The study of Kim et al. suggests that the production of reactive oxygen species at low concentrations may have contributed to the development of leukoderma in users of these cosmetic products.

=== Reactive metabolites ===
The study of Ito et al. showed that rhododendrol exerts its toxic effect in the melanocytes via tyrosinase-dependent mechanisms. This tyrosinase enzyme breaks rhododendrol down into the following reactive metabolites: RD-quinone and RD-cyclic quinone. These reactive metabolites can bind to proteins which contain a thiol-group or it can form radicals. These radicals are toxic to the melanocytes as it causes auto-oxidation of the cells. Auto-oxidation, in turn, causes oxidative stress to cells, which will impair the natural growth and function of the melanocytes.

Rhododenol and raspberry ketone impair the regular proliferation of melanocytes through reactive oxygen species-dependent activation of GADD45.

== Effects on animals ==
The effect of rhododendrol (4-(4-hydroxyphenyl)-2-butanol) is measured in mice as well as in guinea pigs. These studies were performed to elucidate the aetiology of RD-induced leukoderma. The data of these studies revealed that the amount of RD applied to the skin is highly relevant considering that high doses of RD are required in order to cause cytotoxicity. This finding is contrary to the results presented in the study of Kim et al., which is performed in humans. Furthermore, the animal studies enlightened the importance of the ER-stress response. It is suggested that the activity of the ER-stress response may determine whether melanocytes survive or die. Also, the study of Abe et al. revealed that the autophagy pathway may be involved in the resistance to the cytotoxicity of RD.

Since the biochemical and histological characteristics of the used mice in the animal studies (hairless hk14-SCF Tg mice) closely resembled the characteristics of the human skin, these newly generated mice could be used as experimental animal models to investigate chemical vitiligo further.
