= Arboretum d'Amance =

Arboretum in Champenoux, Meurthe-et-Moselle, Lorraine, France

Coordinates: 48.7513°N 6.3360°E

The Arboretum d'Amance (French pronunciation: [aʁbɔʁetɔm damɑ̃s]; 9 hectares) is an arboretum located in Champenoux, Meurthe-et-Moselle, Lorraine, France. It is managed by the Centre INRA de Nancy, a branch of the Institut National de la Recherche Agronomique (INRA), and open on the third Saturday of the warmer months; an admission fee is charged.

The arboretum was created in 1900 with two objectives: as a research facility for students at the forestry school, and to study acclimatization of exotic species in the Lorraine. It was known by a series of names - Arboretum de la Voivre, Arboretum du Fays, and Arboretum de L'École Nationale des Eaux et des Forêts - before receiving its current name in 1964 when it became attached to the INRA forestry school.

From 1900 to 1901 about 1200 plants were installed in 74 plots, organized geographically, which represented 230 species (98 conifers, 132 deciduous). The arboretum received substantial damage during World War I but was restored 1923–1925, only to receive further damage during World War II as the Germans camped on its boundary and stored ammunition within the arboretum itself, which was in consequence shelled by American forces. The arboretum was again restored from 1960 to 1967, and enlarged by a further 3 hectares. It received moderate damage in a heavy storm of December 1999 but has subsequently been restored.

Today the arboretum contains more than 405 varieties of trees representing 88 species; despite the arboretum's difficult history, many mature specimens remain from the arboretum's earliest planting. It is organized into four major sections:

- Occidental Eurasia and North Africa - Abies alba, Abies bornmuelleriana, Abies nordmanniana, Alnus cordata, Alnus subcordata, Betula pendula, Cedrus atlantica, Larix decidua, Parrotia persica, Picea orientalis, Picea omorica, Pinus nigra, Prunus avium, Pterocarya fraxinifolia, Quercus frainetto, Sorbus domestica, etc.
- Oriental Eurasia (Siberia, Korea, China, Japan) - Abies koreana, Acer japonicum, Betula maximowicziana, Chamaecyparis pisifera, Cryptomeria japonica, Ginkgo biloba, Larix kaempferi, Metasequoia glyptostroboides, Pinus griffithii, Sciadopitys verticillata, Thujopsis dolabrata, etc.
- North America, Atlantic region - Acer saccharum, Betula lenta, Carya ovata, Cornus, Hamamelis, Juglans cinerea, Liquidambar styraciflua, Liriodendron tulipifera, Nyssa sylvatica, Pinus strobus, Quercus palustris, Quercus phellos, Quercus rubra, Quercus velutina, Taxodium distichum, etc.
- North America, Pacific region - Abies grandis, Abies procera, Acer macrophyllum, Alnus rubra, Chamaecyparis lawsoniana, Chamaecyparis nootkatensis, Libocedrus decurrens, Pinus ponderosa, Populus trichocarpa, Pseudotsuga menziesii, Sequoiadendron giganteum, Thuja plicata, etc.

== See also ==
- List of botanical gardens in France
