= Grand Couronné =

Geological formation near Nancy, France

Coordinates: 48.779°N 6.244°E

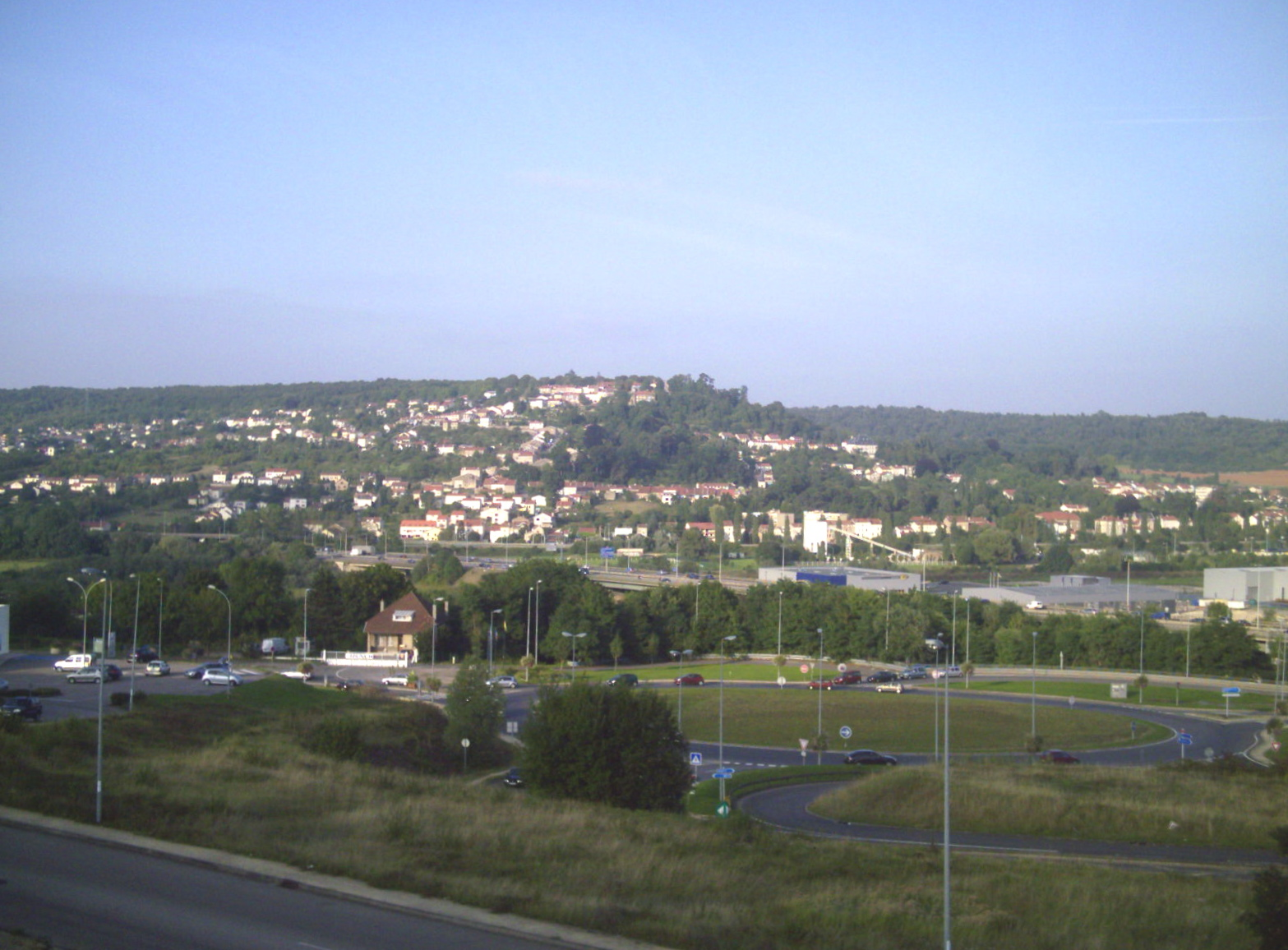
Bouxières-aux-Dames from the Zac de Frouard

The Grand Couronné (French pronunciation: [ɡʁɑ̃ kuʁɔne]) is a succession of inliers north and east of the French city of Nancy.

It is 30 km (19 mi) long and between 2 and 8 km (1.2 and 5.0 mi) wide. The highest point is 400 m (1,300 ft).

The heights of the Grand Couronné played an important role during World War I in defending Nancy against the German Army.

Until 2017, 19 villages from Bouxières-aux-Chênes in the north-west, to Moncel-sur-Seille in the north-east, to Haraucourt in the south, formed the Communauté de communes du Grand Couronné.

== See also ==
- Battle of Grand Couronné
