= Champenoux =

- Commune
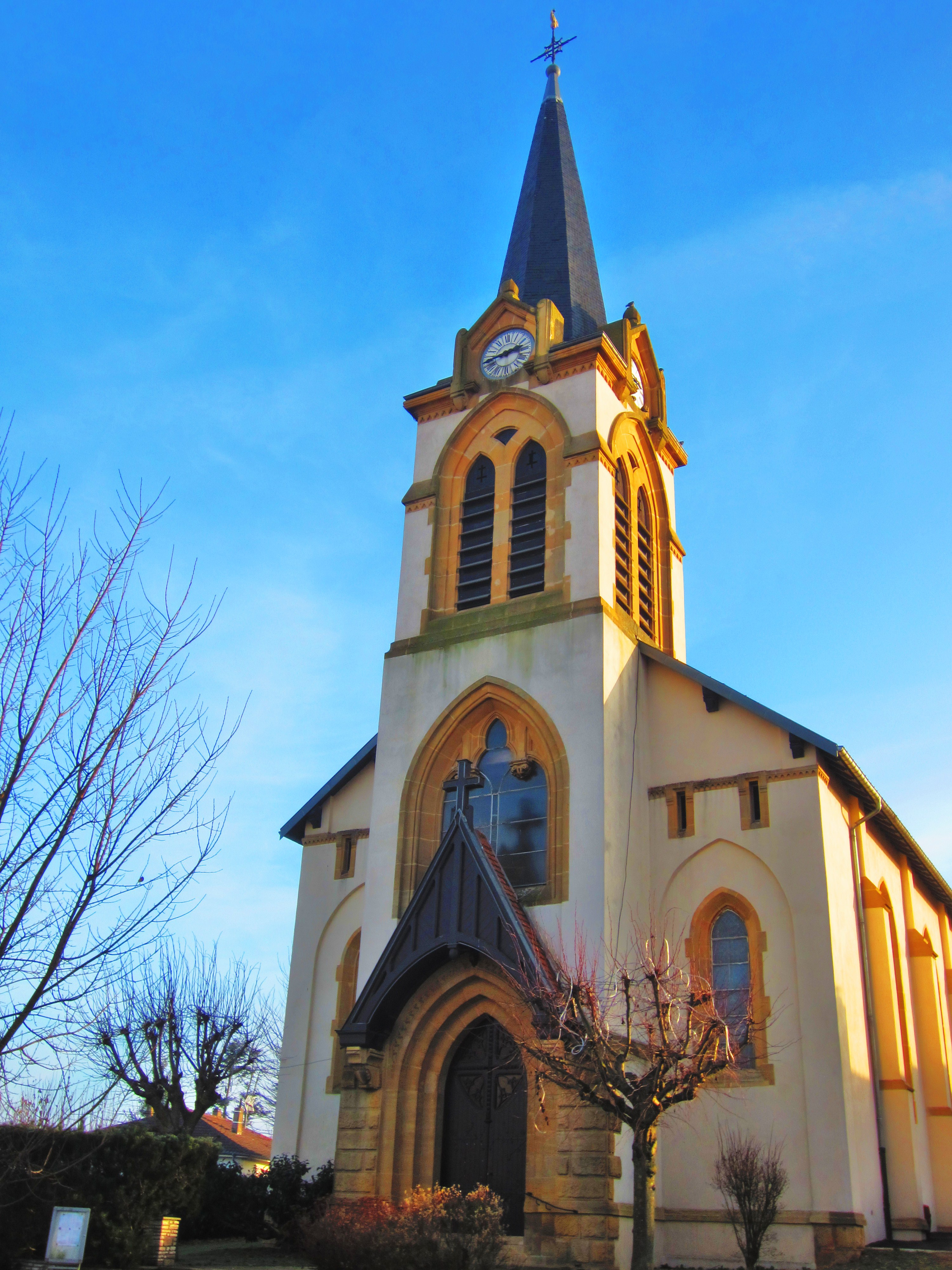
- The church in Champenoux

- Coat of arms
- Location of Champenoux
- Location within France Location within Grand Est
- Coordinates: 48°44′37″N 6°21′00″E
- Country: France
- Region: Grand Est
- Department: Meurthe-et-Moselle
- Arrondissement: Nancy
- Canton: Grand Couronné

Government
  - Mayor (2020–2026): Serge Feger
- Area^{1}: 10.99 km^{2} (4.24 sq mi)
- Elevation: 270 m (890 ft)
- Highest elevation: 274 m (899 ft)
- Lowest elevation: 220 m (720 ft)
- Population (2023): 1,568
  - Density: 142.7/km^{2} (369.5/sq mi)
- Time zone: UTC+01:00 (CET)
  - Summer (DST): UTC+02:00 (CEST)
- INSEE/Postal code: 54113 /54280
- ^{1} French Land Register data, which excludes lakes, ponds, glaciers > 1 km^{2} (0.386 sq mi or 247 acres) and river estuaries.

Champenoux (French pronunciation: [ʃɑ̃pənu]) is a commune in the Meurthe-et-Moselle department in north-eastern France.

The commune covers an area of 10.99 km^{2} (4.24 sq mi). Serge Feger is the mayor for the 2020-2026 tenure.

== Points of interest ==
- Arboretum d'Amance

== See also ==
- Communes of the Meurthe-et-Moselle department
