= Stigmella corylifoliella =

Scientific classification
- Kingdom: Animalia
- Phylum: Arthropoda
- Clade: Pancrustacea
- Class: Insecta
- Order: Lepidoptera
- Family: Nepticulidae
- Genus: Stigmella
- Species: S. corylifoliella

Binomial name
- Stigmella corylifoliella (Clemens, 1861)

Synonyms
- List: Nepticula corylifoliella Clemens, 1862; Nepticula virginiella Clemens, 1862; Nepticula minimella Chambers, 1873 (not Nepticula minimella (Rebel, 1926)); Nepticula opulifoliella Braun, 1914; Nepticula paludicola Braun, 1917; Nepticula exasperata Braun, 1930

Species of moth

Stigmella corylifoliella is a moth of the family Nepticulidae, described by the American entomologist, James Brackenridge Clemens in 1861. It is found in North America in Ohio, New Jersey, Maine, Michigan, Kentucky, California, Pennsylvania, Maryland, North Carolina, Ontario, New Brunswick, Quebec and British Columbia.

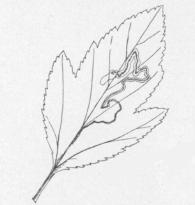
Mine

The wingspan is 3.5 mm.

The larvae are leaf miners, feeding on a wide range of plants, including Vaccinium, Corylus (including Corylus americana), Opulaster, Betula, Gaylussacia, Hamamelis virginiana and Alnus rugosa var. americana. They mine the leaves of their host plant.

The Hodges number of this moth is 0092.
