= 1968 in paleontology =

Paleontology or palaeontology is the study of prehistoric life forms on Earth through the examination of plant and animal fossils. This includes the study of body fossils, tracks (ichnites), burrows, cast-off parts, fossilised feces (coprolites), palynomorphs and chemical residues. Because humans have encountered fossils for millennia, paleontology has a long history both before and after becoming formalized as a science. This article records significant discoveries and events related to paleontology that occurred or were published in the year 1968.

== Flora ==
=== Ferns and fern allies ===
Name	Novelty	Status	Authors	Age	Type locality	Location	Notes	Images
Allantodiopsis pugetensis	Sp nov	valid	Wolfe	Middle Eocene	Puget Group "Lower Fultonian"	USA; Washington	A dryopteridaceous fern	Allantodiopsis pugetensis

=== Angiosperms ===
Name	Novelty	Status	Authors	Age	Type locality	Location	Notes	Images
Alnus kluckingi	Sp nov	valid	Wolfe	Late Eocene "Upper Ravenian"	Puget Group "below Kummer sandstone bed" Loc 9837	USA; Washington	A alder species.	
Anacardites franklinensis	Sp nov	valid	Wolfe	Late Eocene "Lower Fultonian"	Roslyn Formation	USA; Washington	A cashew foliage form genus.	
Artocarpoides kummerensis	Sp nov	jr synonym	Wolfe	Late Eocene "Upper Ravenian"	Puget Group "below Cashman bed" Loc 9731	USA; Washington	A dicot of uncertain affinity. Moved to Dicotylophyllum kummerensis (1977); Moved to Republica kummerensis (1987)	
Artocarpoides litseafolia	Comb nov	jr synonym	(MacGinitie) Wolfe	Eocene; Ypresian	Ione Formation "Chalk Bluff Flora" Loc P3324	USA; California	A dicot of uncertain affinity. Moved from Lauropliyllum litseafolia (1941); Moved to Dicotylophyllum litseafolia (1969). Moved to Republica litseafolia (1987)	
Calkinsia	Gen et sp nov	valid	Wolfe	Late Eocene "Upper Ravenian"	Puget Group "below Cashman bed" Loc 9731	USA; Washington	A moon seed relative. The type species is C. franklinensis	
Camellia multiforma	Comb nov	valid	(Potbury) Wolfe	Latest Eocene-Earliest Oligocene	La Porte Tuff	USA; California	A Camellia species. Moved from Euphorbiophyllum multiformum (1935)	
Carya cashmanensis	Sp nov	valid	Wolfe	Late Eocene "Upper Ravenian"	Puget Group "below Cashman bed" Loc 9731	USA; Washington	A hickory relative.	
Carya pugetensis	Sp nov	valid	Wolfe	Late Eocene "Upper Ravenian"	Puget Group "below Kummer sandstone bed" Loc 9680	USA; Washington	A hickory relative.	
Castanopsis franklinensis	Sp. nov	valid	Wolfe	Late Eocene "Lower Fultonian"	Puget Group "Above Franklin bed 12" Loc 9678	USA; Washington	A chinquapin species.	
Cladrastis pugetensis	Sp. nov	valid	Wolfe	Late Eocene "Upper Ravenian"	Puget Group "below Cashman bed" Loc 9731	USA; Washington	A Cladrastis species legume.	
Dryophyllum pugetensis	Sp. nov	valid	Wolfe	Late Eocene "Lower Ravenian"	Puget Group "Between Ravensdale beds 3 & 4" Loc 9694	USA; Washington	A Dryophyllum species.	
Fothergilla durhamensis	Sp. nov	jr synonym	Wolfe	Late Eocene "Upper Fultonian"	Puget Group "Below Durham bed 1" Loc 9832	USA; Washington	A platanaceous species. Moved to Platimeliphyllum durhamensis in (2022)	
Goweria	Gen et 2 Sp. nov	valid	Wolfe	Eocene		USA; Oregon	A icacinaceous genus. The type species is "Benzoin" dilleri (1900). The genus also includes G. linearis.	
Hyperbaena dilleri	Comb nov	Jr synonym	(Knowlton) Wolfe	Eocene		USA; Oregon	A moon seed relative. Moved from "Benzoin" dilleri (1900). Moved to Calkinsia dilleri (1977)	
Hypserpa cashmanensis	Gen et sp nov	valid	Wolfe	Late Eocene "Upper Ravenian"	Puget Group "below Cashman bed" Loc 9731	USA; Washington	A Hypserpa species moon seed.	
Hypserpa cashmanensis	Sp nov	valid	Wolfe	Late Eocene "Upper Ravenian"	Puget Group "below Cashman bed" Loc 9731	USA; Washington	A Hypserpa species moon seed.	
Hypserpa franklinensis	Sp nov	valid	Wolfe	Late Eocene "Lower Fultonian"	Puget Group "Above Franklin bed 12" Loc 9678	USA; Washington	A Hypserpa species moon seed.	
Macaranga pugetensis	Sp. nov	valid	Wolfe	Late Eocene "Upper Ravenian"	Puget Group "below Cashman bed" Loc 9731	USA; Washington	A Macaranga species euphorbe.	
Macclintockia pugetensis	Sp nov	valid	Wolfe	Late Eocene "Upper Kummerian"	Puget Group; Renton Formation Loc 9688	USA; Washington	A Macclintockia species.	
Pterocarya pugetensis	Sp. nov	valid	Wolfe	Late Eocene "Upper Ravenian"	Puget Group "below Kummer sandstone bed" Loc 9837	USA; Washington	A wingnut species.	
"Pugetia"	Gen et sp nov	homonym	Wolfe	Late Eocene "Upper Fultonian"	Puget Group "Green River canyon, above vein 12" Loc 1963	USA; Washington	A possible hickory relative. The type species is "P". longifolia Junior homonym of Pugetia Kylin, 1925	
Rhamnites cashmanensis	Sp nov	jr synonym	Wolfe	Late Eocene "Upper Ravenian"	Puget Group "below Cashman bed" Loc 9731	USA; Washington	identified as a Rhamnites buckthorn foliage. Moved to Parashorea cashmanensis (1977)	
Rhamnites franklinensis	Sp nov	valid	Wolfe	Late Eocene "Lower Fultonian"	Puget Group "Above Franklin bed 12" Loc 9678	USA; Washington	A Rhamnites buckthorn foliage.	
Ternstroemites ravenensis	Sp nov	valid	Wolfe	Late Eocene "Lower Ravenian"	Puget Group "Between Ravensdale beds 3 & 4" Loc 9694	USA; Washington	A Ternstroemites theaceous foliage.	
Viburnum pugetensis	Sp nov	valid	Wolfe	Late Eocene "Lower Fultonian"	Puget Group "Above Franklin bed 12" Loc 9678	USA; Washington	A Viburnum species.	
Vinea	Gen et sp nov	valid	Wolfe	Late Eocene "Upper Fultonian"	Puget Group "Below Durham bed 1" Loc 9832	USA; Washington	A walnut relative. Also noted from the Roslyn Formation.	
Willisia	Gen et sp nov	Jr homonym	Wolfe	Late Eocene "Upper Fultonian"	Puget Group "Below Durham bed 1" Loc 9832	USA; Washington	A linden relative. Jr homonym of Willisia Warming 1901. Renamed Plafkeria in (1977); The type species is "W." rentonensis	

== Arthropods ==
=== Insects ===
Name	Novelty	Status	Authors	Age	Unit	Location	Notes	Images
Eriocampa tulameenensis	sp nov	Valid	Rice	Early Eocene	Allenby Formation	Canada; British Columbia	A Tenthredinidae sawfly	Eriocampa tulameenensis
Pseudosiobla campbelli	sp nov	Valid	Rice	Early Eocene	Horsefly Shales	Canada; British Columbia	A Tenthredinidae sawfly	Pseudosiobla campbelli

== Conodonts ==
Name	Novelty	Status	Authors	Age	Location	Notes	Images
Neognathodus	gen nov	Valid taxon	David L. Dunn	Pennsylvanian	Brazil; China; Egypt; Mexico		

== Archosauriformes ==
=== Dinosaurs ===
Taxon	Novelty	Status	Author(s)	Age	Unit	Location	Notes	Images
Aralosaurus tuberiferus	Gen. et sp. nov.	Valid	Rozhdestvensky	Santonian	Bostobe Svita	Kazakhstan	A hadrosaur	
Procheneosaurus convincens	Sp. nov.	Valid	Rozhdestvensky	Santonian	Dabrazinskaya Svita	Kazakhstan	A species of Procheneosaurus, later given the genus name Kazaklambia	

=== Birds ===
Name	Novelty	Status	Authors	Age	Type locality	Country	Notes	Images
Aethia rossmoori	Sp. nov.	Valid	Howard	Late Miocene		USA (California)	An Alcidae.	
Alauda jordanica	Sp. nov.	Valid	Tchernov	Middle Pleistocene	Ubeidiya Formation	Israel	An Alaudidae.	
Alcodes	Gen et sp nov.	Valid	Howard	Late Miocene?		USA	An Alcidae, type species A. ulnulus	
Bathornis fricki	Sp. nov.	Valid	Cracraft	Early Miocene		USA (Wyoming)	A Bathornithid	
Buteo circoides	Sp. nov.	Valid	Kurochkin	Middle Oligocene	Tatal-Gol	Mongolia	An Accipitridae.	
Coturnicops avita	Sp. nov.	Valid	Feduccia	Late Pliocene	Glenns Ferry Formation	USA (Idaho)	A Rallidae.	
Cygnavus formosus	Sp. nov.	Valid	Kurochkin	Late Eocene	Zaysan Bassin	Kazakhstan	An Anatidae.	
"Cygnopterus" lambrechti	Sp. nov.	valid	Kurochkin	Middle Oligocene	Kustovskaya	Kazakhstan	Phoenicopteriformes Incertae Sedis	
Fulica stekelesi	Sp. nov.	Valid	Tchernov	Middle Pleistocene	Ubeidiya Formation	Israel	A Rallidae.	
Fulmarus hammeri	Sp. nov.	Valid	Howard	Late Miocene		USA (California)	A Procellariidae.	
Gobihierax	Gen et Sp. nov.	Valid	Kurochkin	Middle Oligocene	Tatal-Gol	Mongolia	An Accipitridae, Type sp G. edax	
Guguschia nailiae	Sp. nov.	Invalid	Aslanova & Burchak-Abramovich	Middle Oligocene	Maykopian Clay	Azerbaijan	A Swan, Anatidae.	
Laterallus insignis	Sp. nov.	Valid	Feduccia	Late Pliocene	Rexroad Formation	USA (Kansas)	A Rallidae.	
Limicorallus	Gen. et Sp. nov.	Valid	Kurochkin	Middle Oligocene-Miocene	Myn-Say Gorge	Kazakhstan	A Phalacrocoracidae, type species L. saiensis.	
Megaegotheles	Gen. et sp. nov.	Jr synonym	Scarlett	Pleistocene-modern		New Zealand	An Aegothelidae, type sp M. novaezealandiae, jr syn of Aegotheles.	
Megagallinula	Gen. et Sp. nov.	Valid	Kurochkin	Middle Oligocene	Kur-Say Gorge	Kazakhstan	A Rallidae. type sp. M. harundinea	
Melanocorypha gracilis	Sp. nov.	Valid	Tchernov	Middle Pleistocene	Ubeidiya Formation	Israel	An Alaudidae.	
Palaeorallus alienus	Sp. nov.	nomen dubium	Kurochkin	Middle Oligocene	Tatal-Gol	Mongolia	A possible Rallidae,	
Paracrax gigantea	Sp. nov.	Valid	Cracraft	Late Oligocene	Brule Formation	USA (South Dakota)	A Bathornithidae	
Paracrax wetmorei	Sp. nov.	Valid	Cracraft	Late Oligocene	Brule Formation	USA (South Dakota)	A Bathornithidae	
Petronia brevirostris	Sp. nov.	Valid	Tchernov	Middle Pleistocene	Ubeidiya Formation	Israel	A Passeridae.	
Puffinus calhouni	Sp. nov.	Valid	Howard	Late Miocene		USA (California)	A Procellariidae.	
Tutor dementievi	Gen. et sp. nov.	Valid	Kurochkin	Middle Oligocene	Tatal-Gol	Mongolia	An Accipitridae, jr syn of Venerator dementievi	

== Sauropterygians ==
=== Plesiosaurs ===
Name	Novelty	Status	Authors	Age	Type locality	Location	Notes	Images
Ceraunosaurus	Gen et sp nov	jr synonym	Thurmond	Late Cretaceous			junior synonym of Trinacromerum	

== Synapsids ==
=== Mammaliformes ===
Name	Novelty	Status	Authors	Age	Type locality	Location	Notes	Images
Megazostrodon	Gen et sp nov	Valid	Crompton & Jenkins	Early Jurassic	Elliot Formation	Lesotho	A megazostrodontid morganucodont	Megazostrodon
