= Cryptosporella suffusa =

Scientific classification
- Domain: Eukaryota
- Kingdom: Fungi
- Division: Ascomycota
- Class: Sordariomycetes
- Order: Diaporthales
- Family: Gnomoniaceae
- Genus: Cryptosporella
- Species: C. suffusa

Binomial name
- Cryptosporella suffusa (Fr.) L.C. Mejía & Castl.

Synonyms
- Cryptospora suffusa (Fr.) Tul. & C. Tul.; Engizostoma subtectum (Fr.) Kuntze; Ophiovalsa suffusa (Fr.) Petr.; Sphaeria suffusa Fr.; Valsa rhabdospora De Not.; Winterella suffusa (Fr.) Kuntze

Species of fungus

Cryptosporella suffusa is a species of fungus that causes canker in alder trees.

In 2003 in Alaska, many individual thinleaf alder trees (Alnus incana subsp. tenuifolia) were observed to be dying back, with hundreds or thousands of acres of riparian woodland being affected. Individual trunks and whole clumps were involved, dying within two weeks of the onset of the disease. The cause was found to be the fungus Cryptosporella suffusa, which may also have been responsible for a similar mass mortality of alders in the area in the 1950s. The affected trees seemed to be those suffering from stress, perhaps brought on by drought or resulting from defoliating insects such as the woolly alder sawfly.
