= Coleophora corylifoliella =

Scientific classification
- Kingdom: Animalia
- Phylum: Arthropoda
- Clade: Pancrustacea
- Class: Insecta
- Order: Lepidoptera
- Family: Coleophoridae
- Genus: Coleophora
- Species: C. corylifoliella

Binomial name
- Coleophora corylifoliella Clemens, 1861

Species of moth

Coleophora corylifoliella is a moth of the family Coleophoridae. It is found in the United States, including Kentucky, Pennsylvania and Virginia.

The larvae feed on the leaves of Corylus americana. They create a spatulate leaf case.
