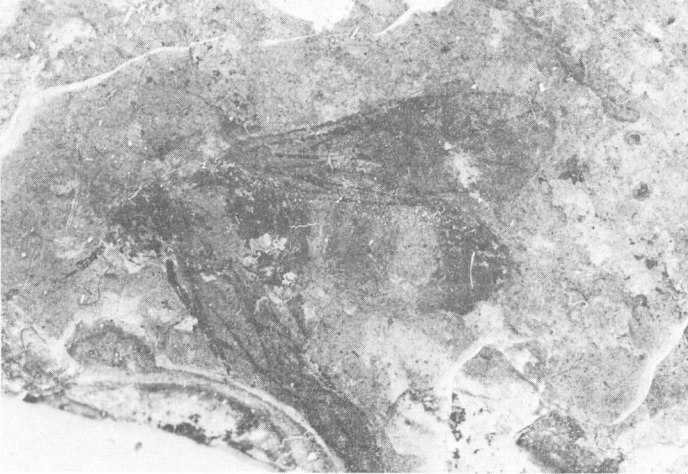
- Pseudosiobla campbelli holotype

Scientific classification
- Kingdom: Animalia
- Phylum: Arthropoda
- Clade: Pancrustacea
- Class: Insecta
- Order: Hymenoptera
- Suborder: Symphyta
- Family: Tenthredinidae
- Genus: Pseudosiobla
- Species: †P. campbelli

Binomial name
- †Pseudosiobla campbelli Rice, 1968

= Pseudosiobla campbelli =

Pseudosiobla campbelli Temporal range: Ypresian

Extinct species of sawfly

Pseudosiobla campbelli is an extinct species of sawfly in the family Tenthredinidae that is known from early Eocene Ypresian stage lake deposits near the unincorporated community of Horsefly, British Columbia.

== History and classification ==
The species is known from only the holotype, a single, mostly complete adult female, now deposited in the Geological Survey of Canada collections as specimen number "GSC No. 22689". The shale specimen is from deposits of the "Horsefly shale" along the Horsefly River in the Cariboo District of British Columbia, Canada.

The holotype was first studied by Harington Rice of the Geological Survey of Canada. Rice published his 1968 type description for P. campbelli in the Geological Survey of Canada professional paper number 67-59. The specific name campbelli was coined in honor of R. B. Campbell who collected the holotype specimen in 1959.

Pseudosiobla campbelli is the smallest species of Pseudosiobla to be described from the fossil record. The single known female possesses a head, thorax and posterior segments of the abdomen which are dark brown to black. The central segments of the abdomen appear to have been pale colored. The wings are hyaline with very dark veins and short, stout hairs across the wing membrane. While the specimen is missing portions of her legs and antennae, her ovipositor is visible and well preserved. P. campbelli is distinguished from members of the related genus Eriocampa in general and E. tulameenensis found in the related lake deposits in Princeton, B.C. by several features: P. campbelli is notably larger than members of Eriocampa and the wing vein patterning is distinct.

There are only two other described species of Pseudosiobla from the fossil record, P. megoura and P. misera. Both species are described from specimens found in the Florissant Formation of Colorado which, at 39 million years old, is younger in age then the Horsefly locality, dated to approximately 49 million years old. P. campbelli can be distinguished from both younger species in that P. campbelli is the smallest species of the three. P. megoura also possesses an abdomen which is twice as long as that of P. campbelli. P. misera has a larger and more elongate abdomen. In his 1908 paper on the Tenthredinoidea of Florissant, S.A. Rohwer, put the possibility of P. megoura and P. misera being the same species.
