= Penicillium nodositatum =

Scientific classification
- Kingdom: Fungi
- Division: Ascomycota
- Class: Eurotiomycetes
- Order: Eurotiales
- Family: Aspergillaceae
- Genus: Penicillium
- Species: P. nodositatum

Binomial name
- Penicillium nodositatum Valla, G. 1989

Type strain
- A4, ATCC 201339 CBS 333.90

Species of fungus

Penicillium nodositatum is an anamorph, biverticillate species of the genus Penicillium which induce the growth of the myconodules in the species Alnus incana.
