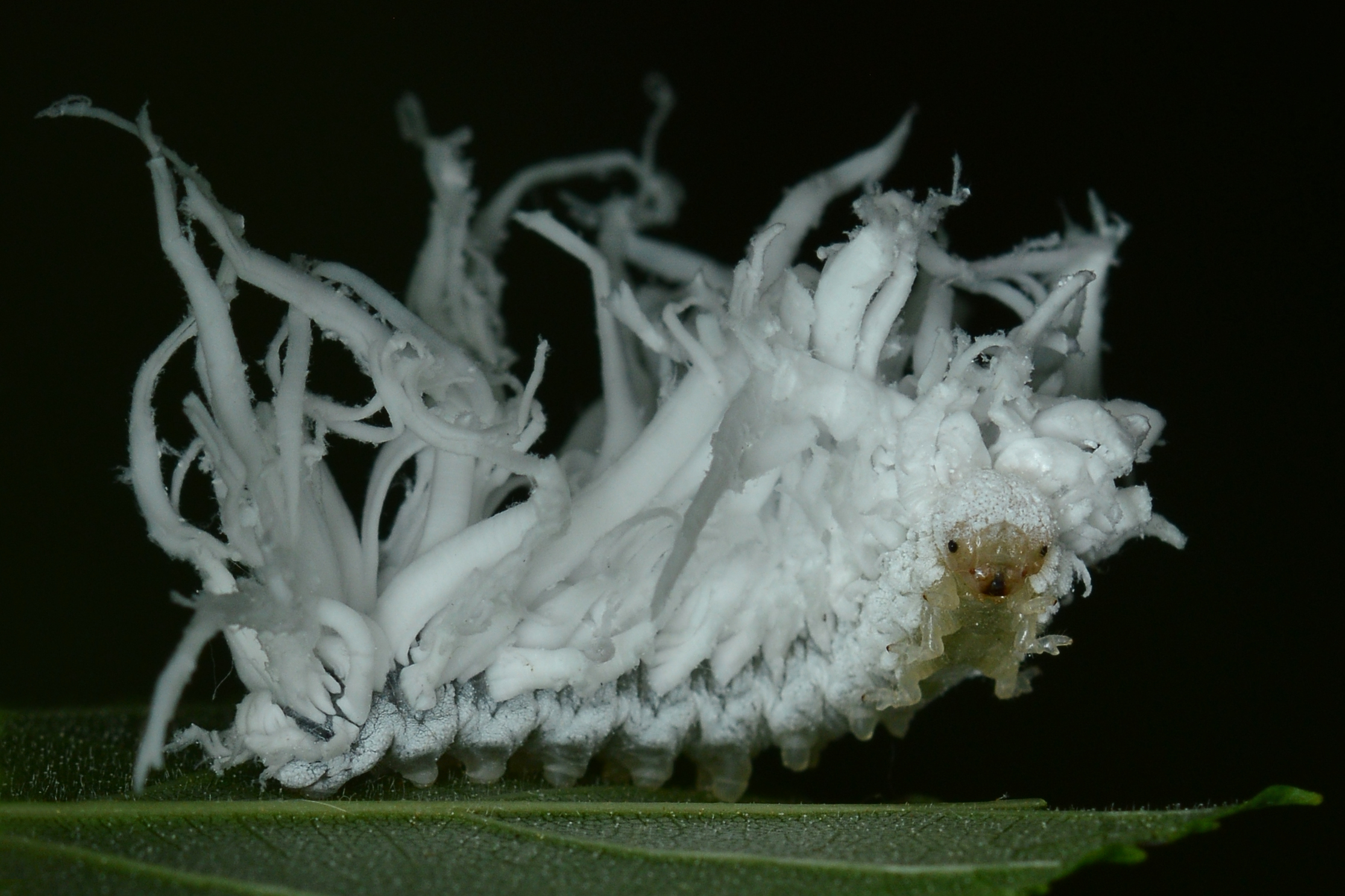
- Kitchener, Ontario, Canada

Scientific classification
- Kingdom: Animalia
- Phylum: Arthropoda
- Clade: Pancrustacea
- Class: Insecta
- Order: Hymenoptera
- Suborder: Symphyta
- Family: Tenthredinidae
- Genus: Eriocampa
- Species: E. juglandis

Binomial name
- Eriocampa juglandis Hartig, 1837
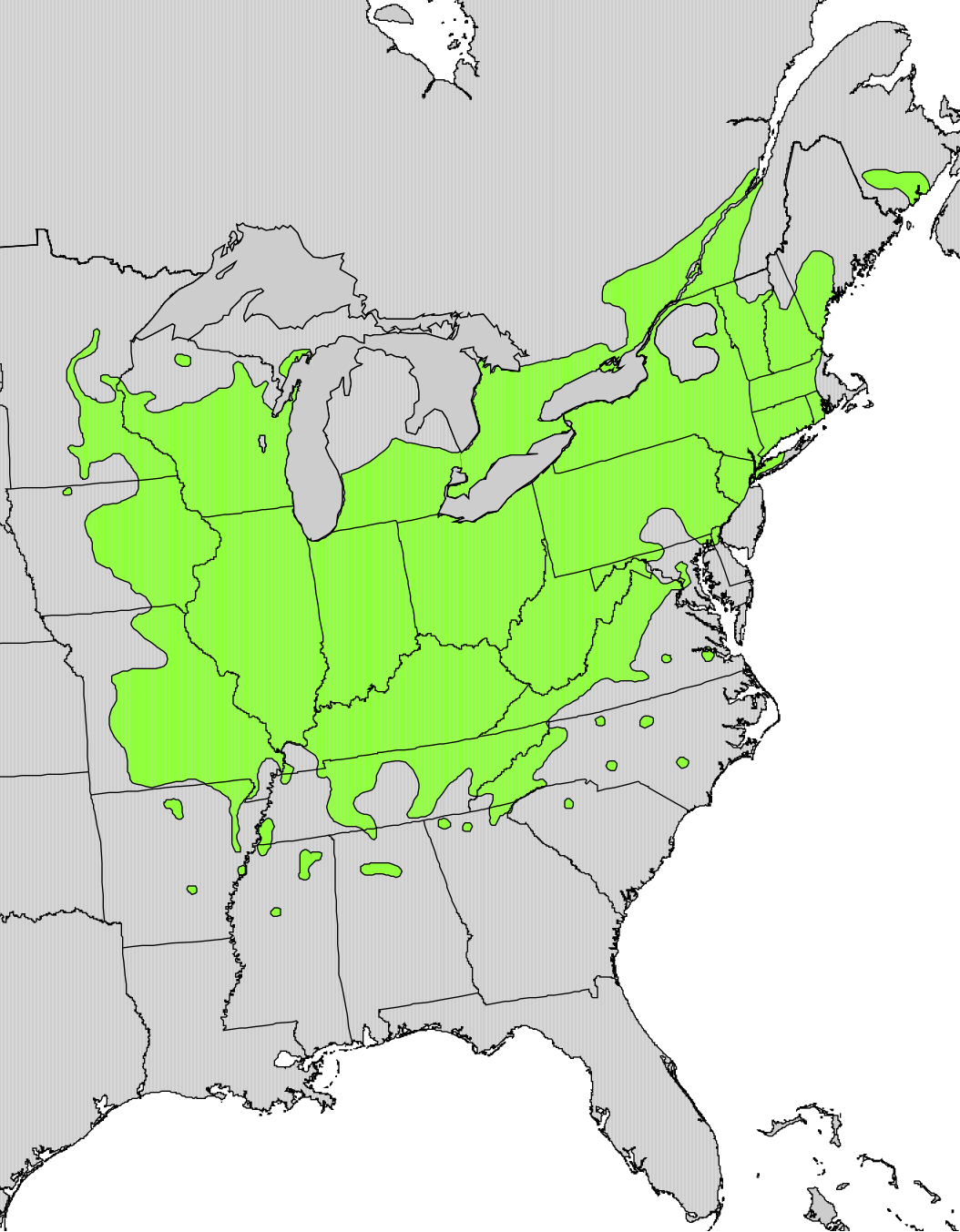
- The historical range of the butternut tree, which E. juglandis lives alongside

= Eriocampa juglandis =

Species of sawfly

Eriocampa juglandis, the butternut woollyworm, is a species of sawfly that lives and feeds on butternuts, black walnuts and hickory. It is in the Hymenoptera order, that of ants, wasps, and bees.

== Description ==
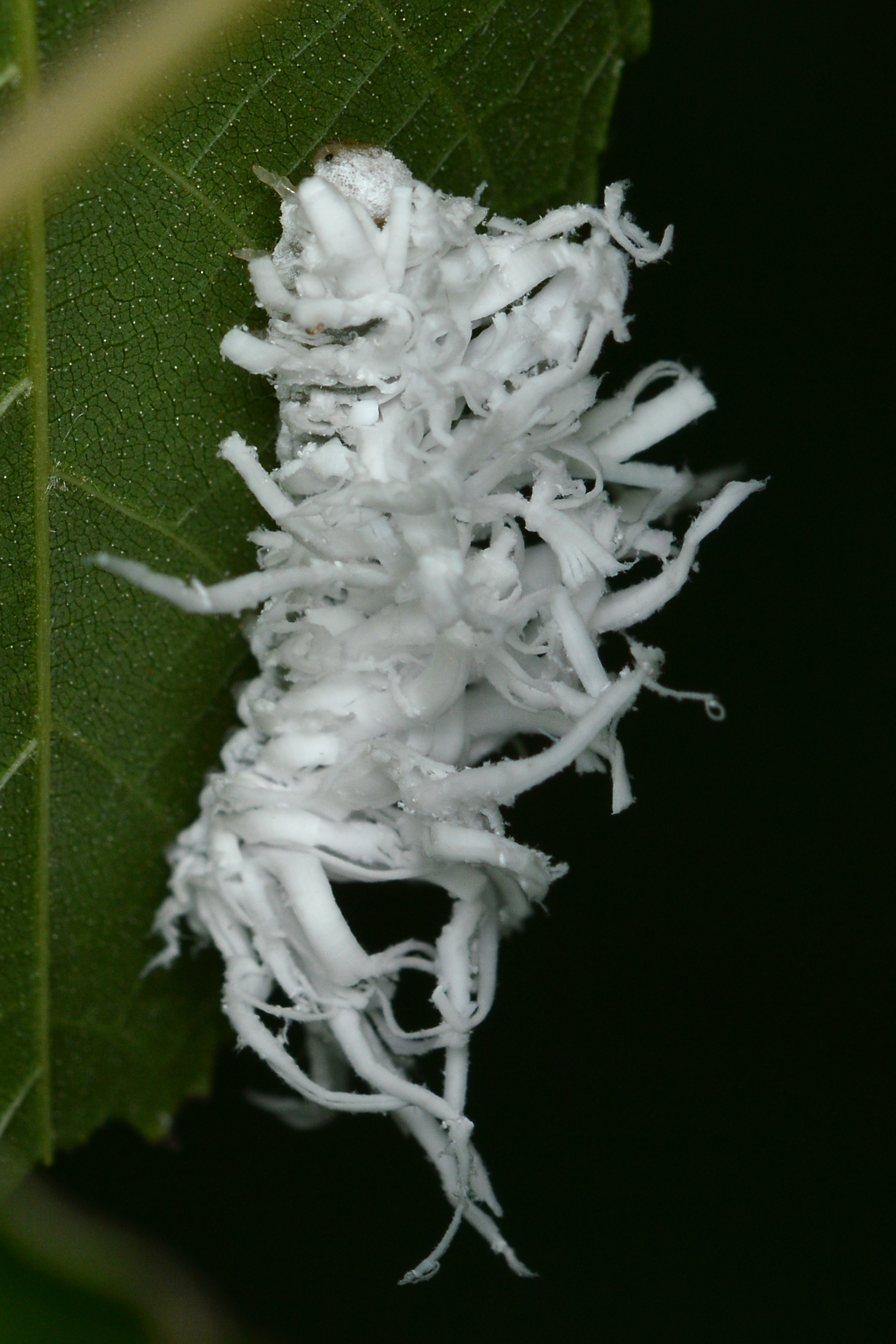
Larva

The larvae will grow to 0.87 inches (22 mm) long and the adult sawfly is 0.47 in (12 mm). The young of this species is covered in white wool which is believed to protect it from predators. Though the larva resembles a caterpillar, sawfly larvae have a pair of legs for every body segment, while caterpillars have a gap between some legs. Sawflies often curl up when disturbed.

The adult is a flying insect with a saw-toothed ovipositor, giving the genus its common name.

== Reproduction ==
Females saw into the mid-rib of leaflets and deposit 20 to 30 eggs, one at a time, which eventually causes the leaflet to droop or fold and the midrib to turn pale. While small larvae chew random holes in leaves, larger ones may finish them off entirely, leaving bits of the larger veins behind. Once fully grown larvae pupate in the soil throughout the winter until spring when they reemerge as adults and mate.

== Range ==
The range of this insect follows the historical range of the butternut tree through the northeast quadrant of North America, including Maryland, Michigan, North Carolina, Wisconsin, and Canada's Eastern provinces. The butternut woollyworm has a small presence in Milwaukee.

Its populations can vary drastically from year to year when they appear in mid-summer. They leave temporary cosmetic damage to host trees, but the damage is limited because the woollyworms do not emerge until the trees are fully leafed out and only have one generation each year. Pest control is generally not needed.
