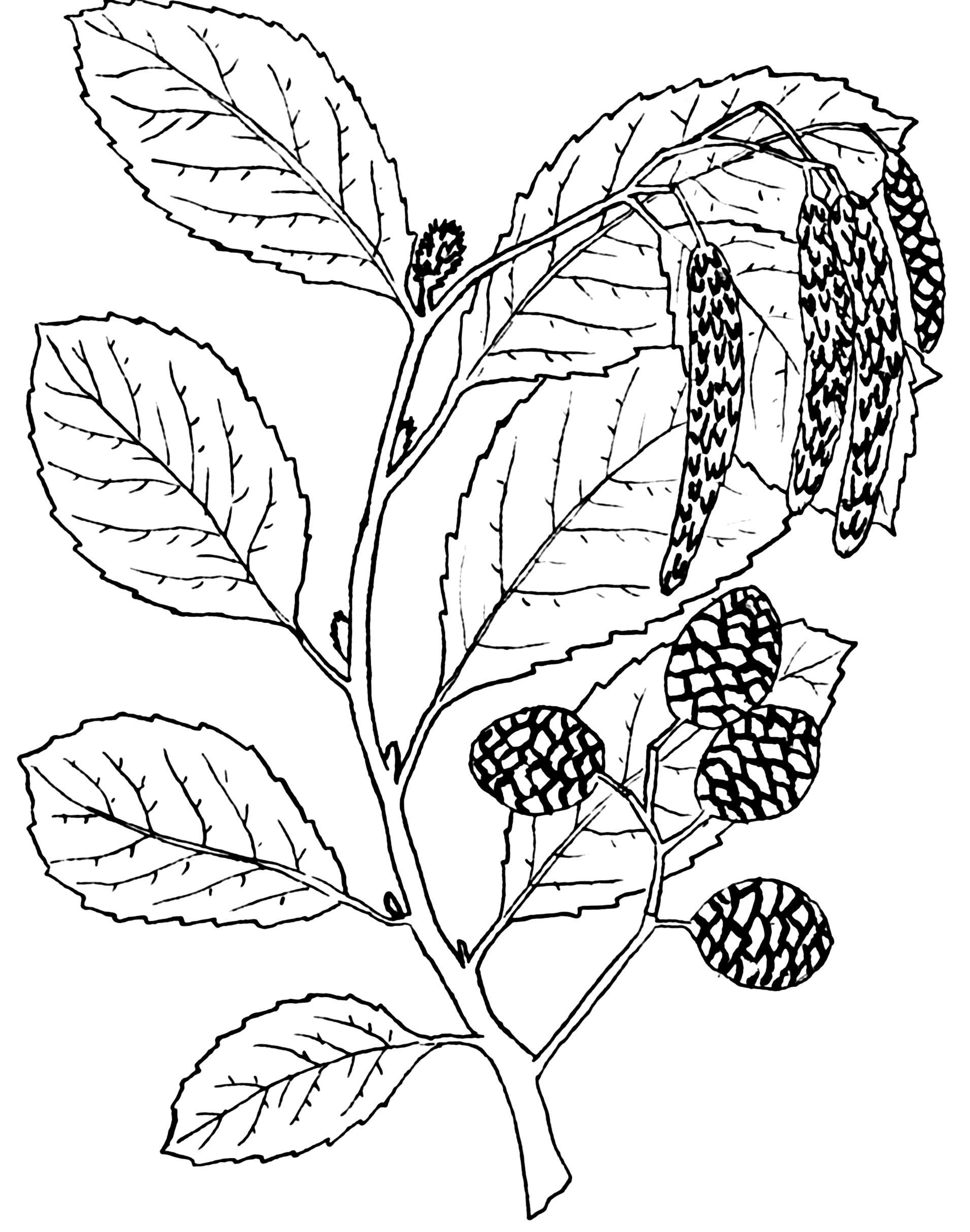

Conservation status
- Least Concern (IUCN 3.1)

Scientific classification
- Kingdom: Plantae
- Clade: Embryophytes
- Clade: Tracheophytes
- Clade: Angiosperms
- Clade: Eudicots
- Clade: Rosids
- Order: Fagales
- Family: Betulaceae
- Genus: Alnus
- Subgenus: Alnus subg. Alnus
- Species: A. oblongifolia

Binomial name
- Alnus oblongifolia Torr.
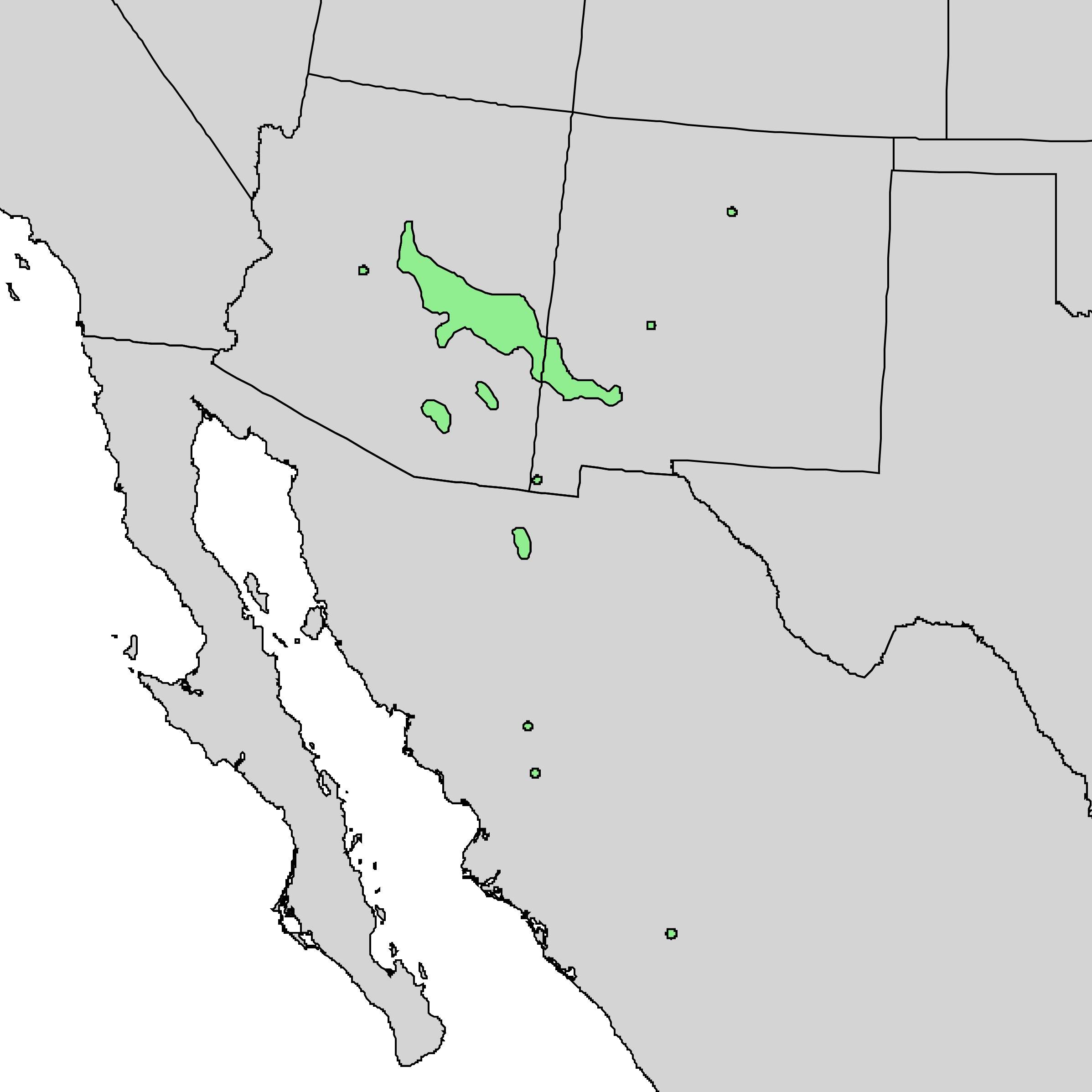
- Natural range of Alnus oblongifolia

Synonyms
- Alnus serrulata var. oblongifolia (Torr.) Regel

= Alnus oblongifolia =

Species of tree

Alnus oblongifolia (Arizona alder) is a large alder growing up to 72 feet (22 m), from the southwestern United States and northern Sonora, Mexico. It grows across Arizona into western New Mexico mountain ranges. In central Arizona its range extends across the transition zone to the White Mountains region of eastern Arizona–western New Mexico border.

Besides the range extension from central Arizona, elsewhere in New Mexico it occurs only in scattered mountain range locales. In southern Arizona south of the Mogollon Rim, also in two mountain regions, and in neighboring Sonora in regions at the north of the Sierra Madre Occidental cordillera near Arizona's southeast Madrean Sky Island ranges of sky islands. Isolated mountain locales also occur in a region of southwest Chihuahua and neighboring northwest Durango, part of the eastern Sierra Madre Occidentals.

== See also ==
- Alnus incana
