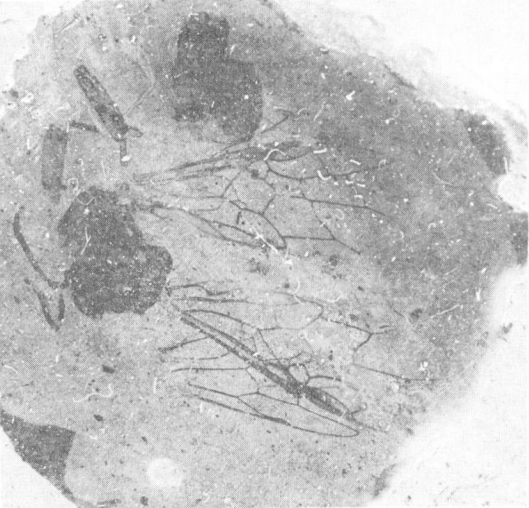
- Eriocampa tulameenensis holotype fossil

Scientific classification
- Domain: Eukaryota
- Kingdom: Animalia
- Phylum: Arthropoda
- Class: Insecta
- Order: Hymenoptera
- Suborder: Symphyta
- Family: Tenthredinidae
- Genus: Eriocampa
- Species: †E. tulameenensis

Binomial name
- †Eriocampa tulameenensis Rice, 1968

= Eriocampa tulameenensis =

Eriocampa tulameenensis Temporal range: Ypresian

Extinct species of sawfly

Eriocampa tulameenensis is an extinct species of sawfly in the family Tenthredinidae that is known from early to early middle Eocene lake deposits near the small community of Princeton, British Columbia in the Similkameen region.

== History and classification ==
Eriocampa tulameenensis is known only from one fossil, the holotype, number "GSC No. 22688". It is a single, mostly complete adult of undetermined sex, preserved as a compression fossil in fine grained shale. The shale specimen is from deposits along the Canadian Pacific rail line in the Similkameen Country of British Columbia, Canada. The type specimen is currently preserved in the Geological Survey of Canada paleoentomological collections in Ottawa, Ontario, Canada. E. tulameenensis was first studied by Harington M. A. Rice of the Geological Survey of Canada, with his 1968 type description being published in the Geological Survey of Canada professional paper number 67-59. The specific epithet tulameenensis was coined in reference to the Tulameen River near where the fossil was collected in 1957, while the river is from the Nlaka'pamux language meaning "red earth".

Eriocampa tulameenensis is the largest species of Eriocampa to be described in the type paper, though the dismembered condition of the body made measurement unpractical. Due to the preservation condition Harington M. A. Rice noted the assignment of the species to Eriocampa as tentative and based on the similarities of the fore wing to other members of the genus. The single known specimen possesses a head, part of the thorax and posterior areas of the abdomen which are dark brown to black. Where they are visible the antennae are filiform and brown to dark brown. The central segments of the abdomen appear to have been pale colored. The well preserved wings are hyaline with dark brown to dark amber veins. Unfortunately the specimen is missing portions of its legs and antennae. E. tulameenensis is distinguished from members of the related genus Pseudosiobla in general and P. campbelli found in the related "Horsefly shale" deposits near Horsefly, British Columbia by several features, E. tulameenensis is notably smaller than members of Pseudosiobla and the fore wing vein patterning is distinct.

There are six other described species of Eriocampa from the fossil record, E. bruesi, E. celata, E. pristina, E. scudderi, E. synthetica, and E. wheeleri. All are described and known only from specimens found in the younger Florissant Formation of Colorado which, at 39 million years old, is younger in age then the Princeton locality, dated to approximately 49 million years old. E. tulameenensis can be distinguished from all the younger species in that E. tulameenensis is the largest species of the seven.
