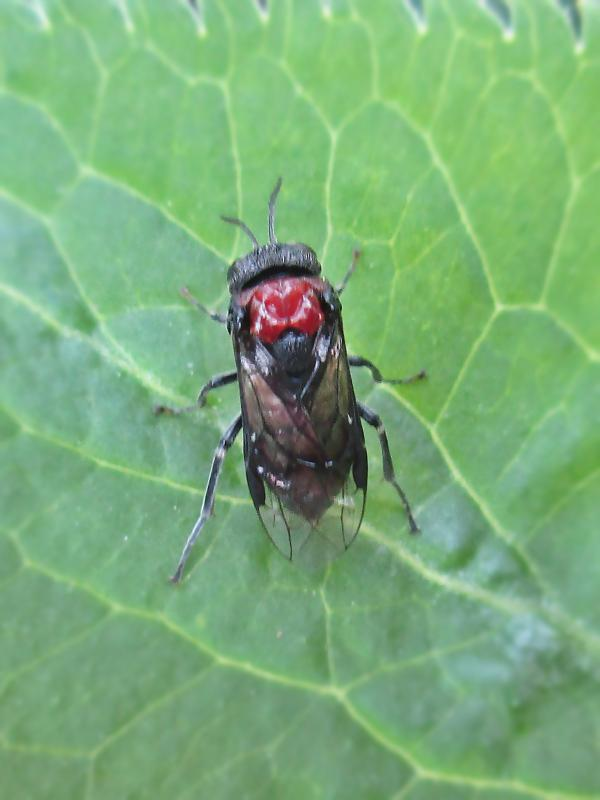

Scientific classification
- Kingdom: Animalia
- Phylum: Arthropoda
- Class: Insecta
- Order: Hymenoptera
- Suborder: Symphyta
- Family: Tenthredinidae
- Genus: Eriocampa
- Species: E. ovata

Binomial name
- Eriocampa ovata (Linnaeus, 1760)

Synonyms
- Tenthredo ovata Linnaeus, 1760

= Eriocampa ovata =

Species of sawfly

Eriocampa ovata, known generally as the alder sawfly or woolly alder sawfly, is a species of common sawfly in the family Tenthredinidae. The larvae feed on the leaves of the common alder (Alnus glutinosa) and the grey alder (Alnus incana), sometimes causing defoliation.

== Description ==
The adult female is about 7 mm (0.3 in) long and mainly black, with the exception of the first two segments of the thorax, which are red, and the underside of the tips of the antennae, the inner side of the fore-tibia and the basal part of the hind femur, which are whitish. The head has numerous large puncture marks while the thorax has scattered smaller ones; the abdomen has faint transverse sculpturings. The wings are translucent with black veins. Adult males are unknown in North America, and rare in Europe, the females breeding by parthenogenesis.

The larvae grow to a length of 5 to 7.5 mm (0.2 to 0.3 in). They are white, apart from a brown mark on the head, and are covered with a glossy, white woolly secretion produced by epidermal glands.

== Distribution and habitat ==
The alder sawfly is native to Europe, but has been accidentally introduced into North America, both the Atlantic and Pacific coasts. It has spread to New York, Massachusetts, Quebec, Ontario, Washington, British Columbia, and Alaska. Host trees include common alder (Alnus glutinosa) and grey alder (Alnus incana), and in addition this sawfly has been recorded in Europe on elm (Ulmus) and hazel (Corylus).

== Life cycle ==
The adult female inserts her ovipositor into the upper surface of a leaf near the midrib to deposit her eggs. On hatching, the larvae feed at first on the upper surface but later transfer to the underside. When fully developed they drop to the ground and make a cocoon in the leaf litter in which they pupate and overwinter. In Quebec there are two generations per year, but in England there is just one. Eggs are laid in young foliage near the base of the tree with the upper crown usually unaffected. Leaves can be skeletonized with just the veins remaining, and growth of the tree may be reduced; stressed trees may be more susceptible to alder canker.

== Gallery ==
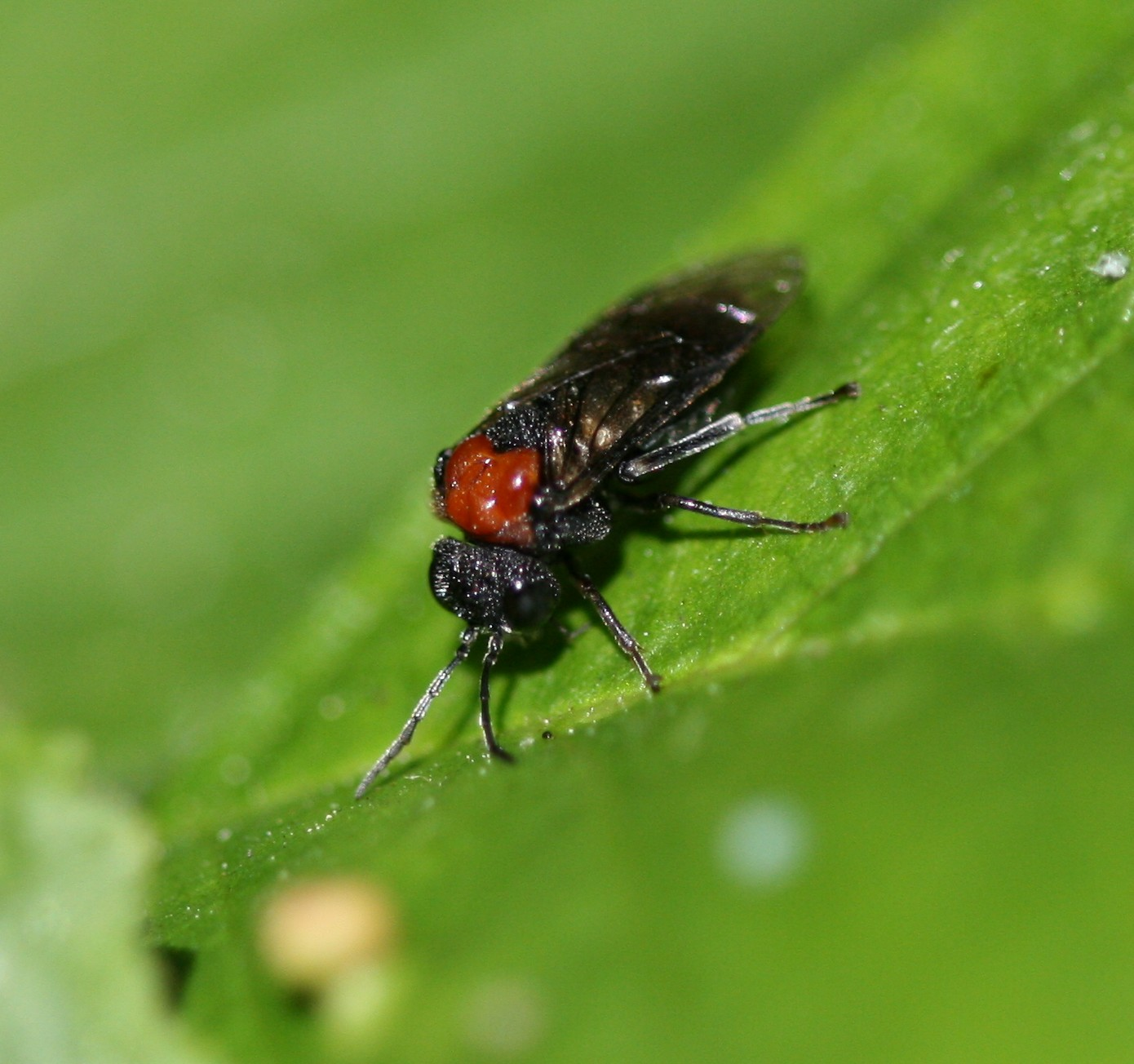
Alder sawfly, Eriocampa ovata

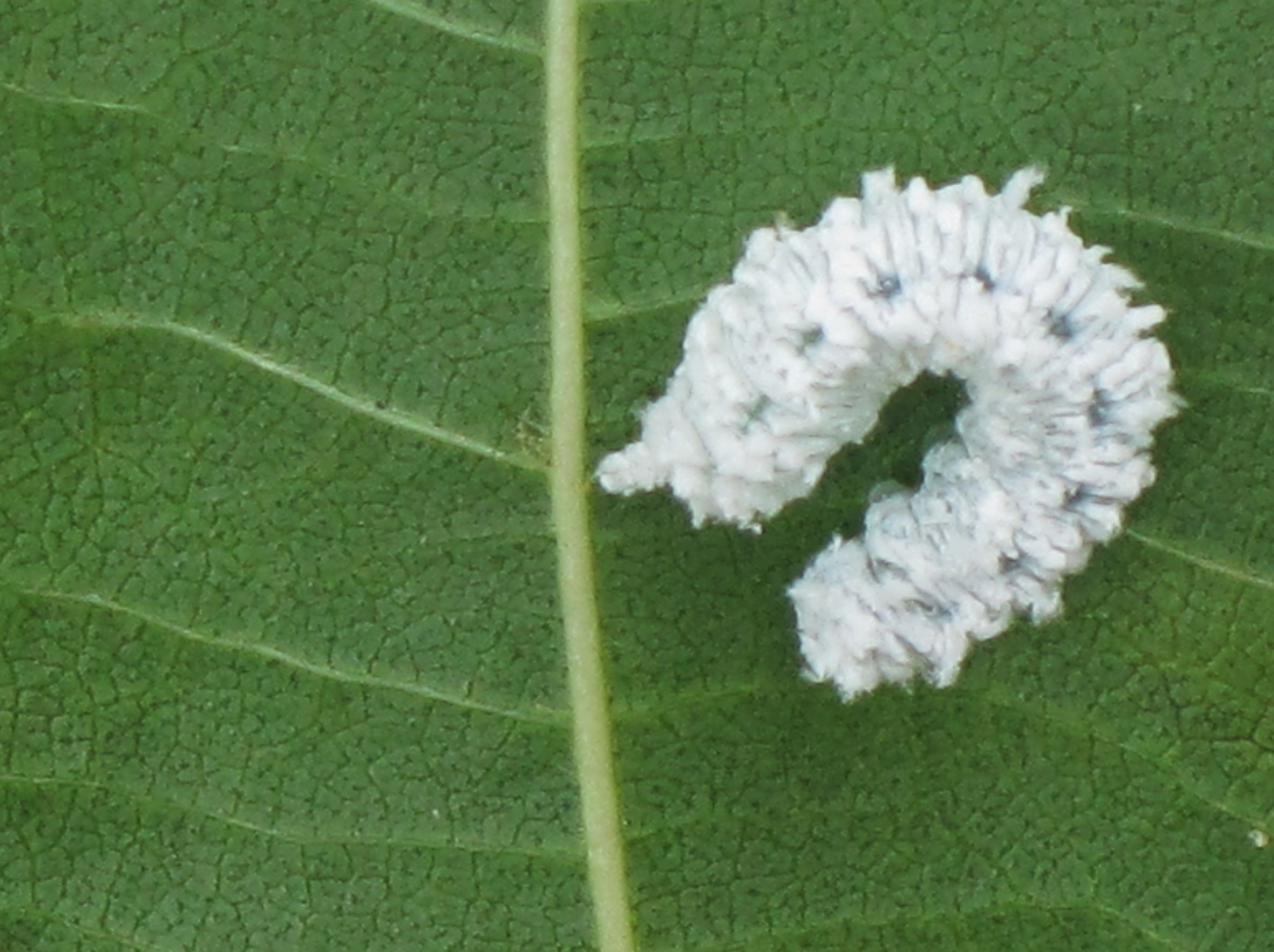
Larva
