= Cryptosporella =

Scientific classification
- Kingdom: Fungi
- Division: Ascomycota
- Class: Sordariomycetes
- Order: Diaporthales
- Family: Gnomoniaceae
- Genus: Cryptosporella; Sacc. (1877)

Type species
- Cryptosporella hypodermia (Fr.) Sacc. (1877)

Genus of fungi

Cryptosporella is a genus of fungi in the family Gnomoniaceae. The genus was first circumscribed by Pier Andrea Saccardo in 1877. The genus contains 19 species.

== Species ==
- Cryptosporella alnicola
- Cryptosporella alni-rubrae
- Cryptosporella alni-sinuatae
- Cryptosporella alni-tenuifoliae
- Cryptosporella amistadensis
- Cryptosporella betulae
- Cryptosporella corylina
- Cryptosporella femoralis
- Cryptosporella hypodermia
- Cryptosporella jaklitschii
- Cryptosporella marylandica
- Cryptosporella multicontinentalis
- Cryptosporella pacifica
- Cryptosporella suffusa
- Cryptosporella tomentella
- Cryptosporella wehmeyeriana
- Cryptosporella umbrina
