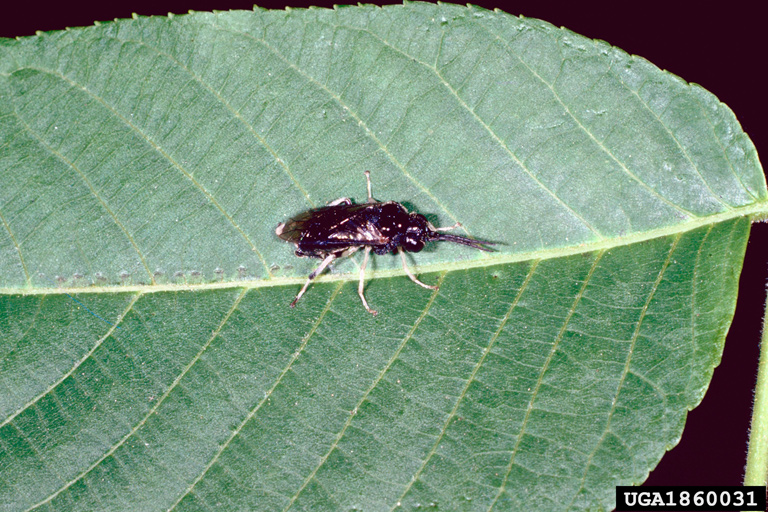
- Eriocampa juglandis

Scientific classification
- Domain: Eukaryota
- Kingdom: Animalia
- Phylum: Arthropoda
- Class: Insecta
- Order: Hymenoptera
- Suborder: Symphyta
- Family: Tenthredinidae
- Tribe: Eriocampini
- Genus: Eriocampa; Hartig, 1837

= Eriocampa =

Genus of sawflies

Eriocampa is a genus of common sawflies in the family Tenthredinidae. There are about ten described species in Eriocampa.

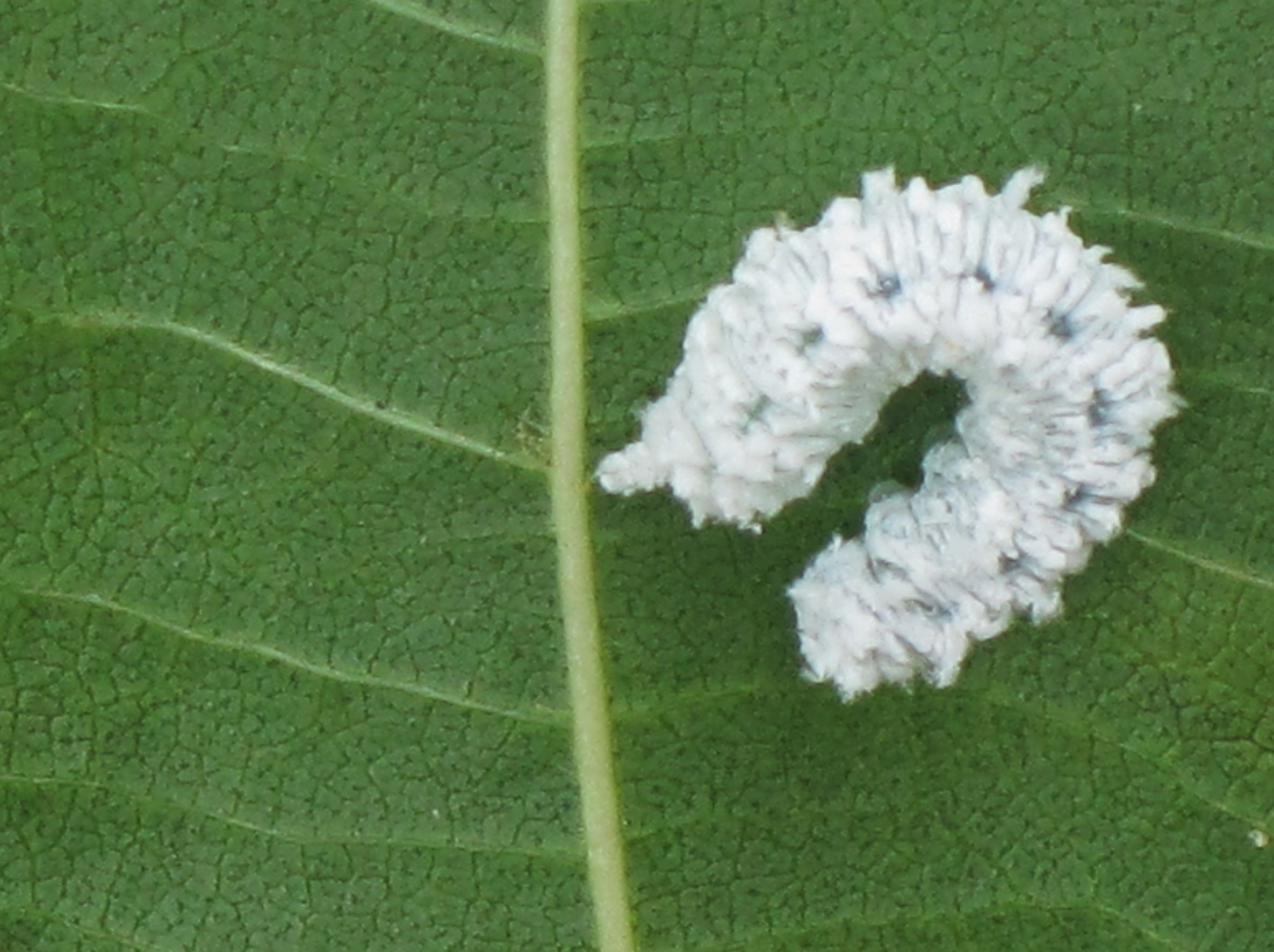
Eriocampa ovata, larva

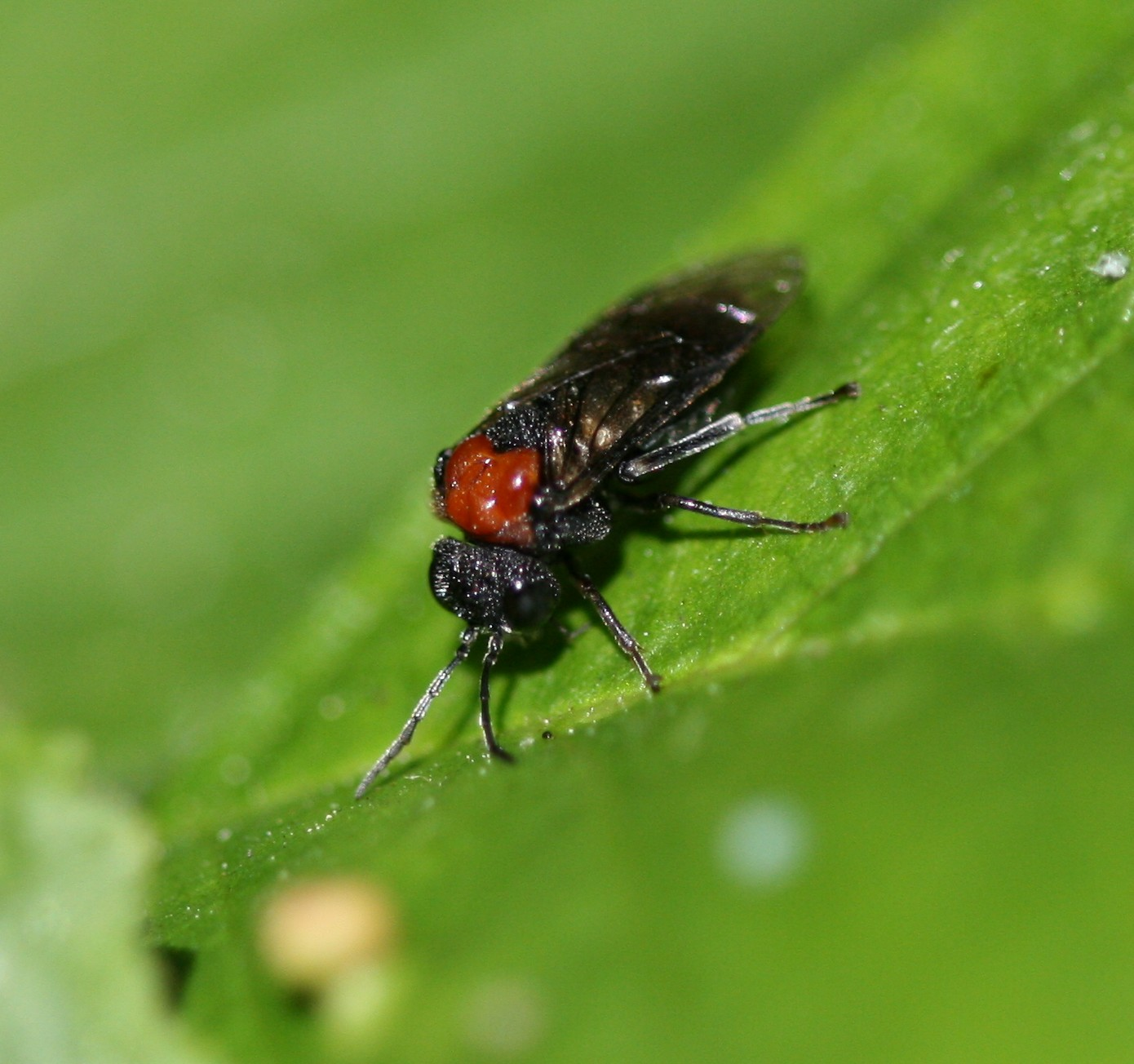
Eriocampa ovata

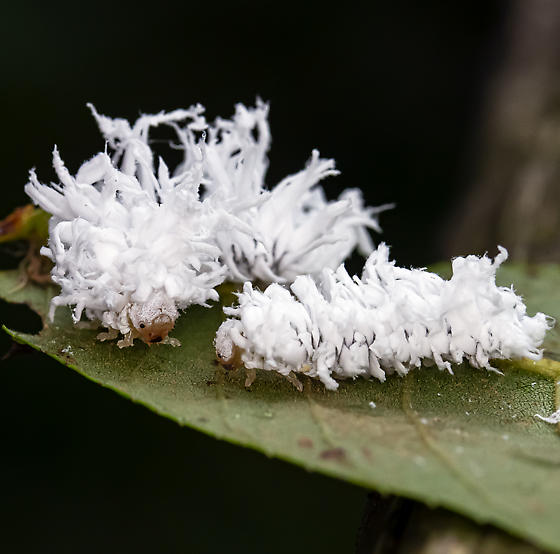
Woolly Butternut Sawfly (Eriocampa juglandis) larvae

Seven fossil species are known (see Eriocampa tulameenensis).

== Species ==
These five extant species belong to the genus Eriocampa:

- Eriocampa dorpatica Konow, 1887
- Eriocampa juglandis (butternut woollyworm)
- Eriocampa mitsukurii Rohwer, 1910
- Eriocampa ovata (Linnaeus, 1761) (alder sawfly)
- Eriocampa umbratica (Klug, 1816)
