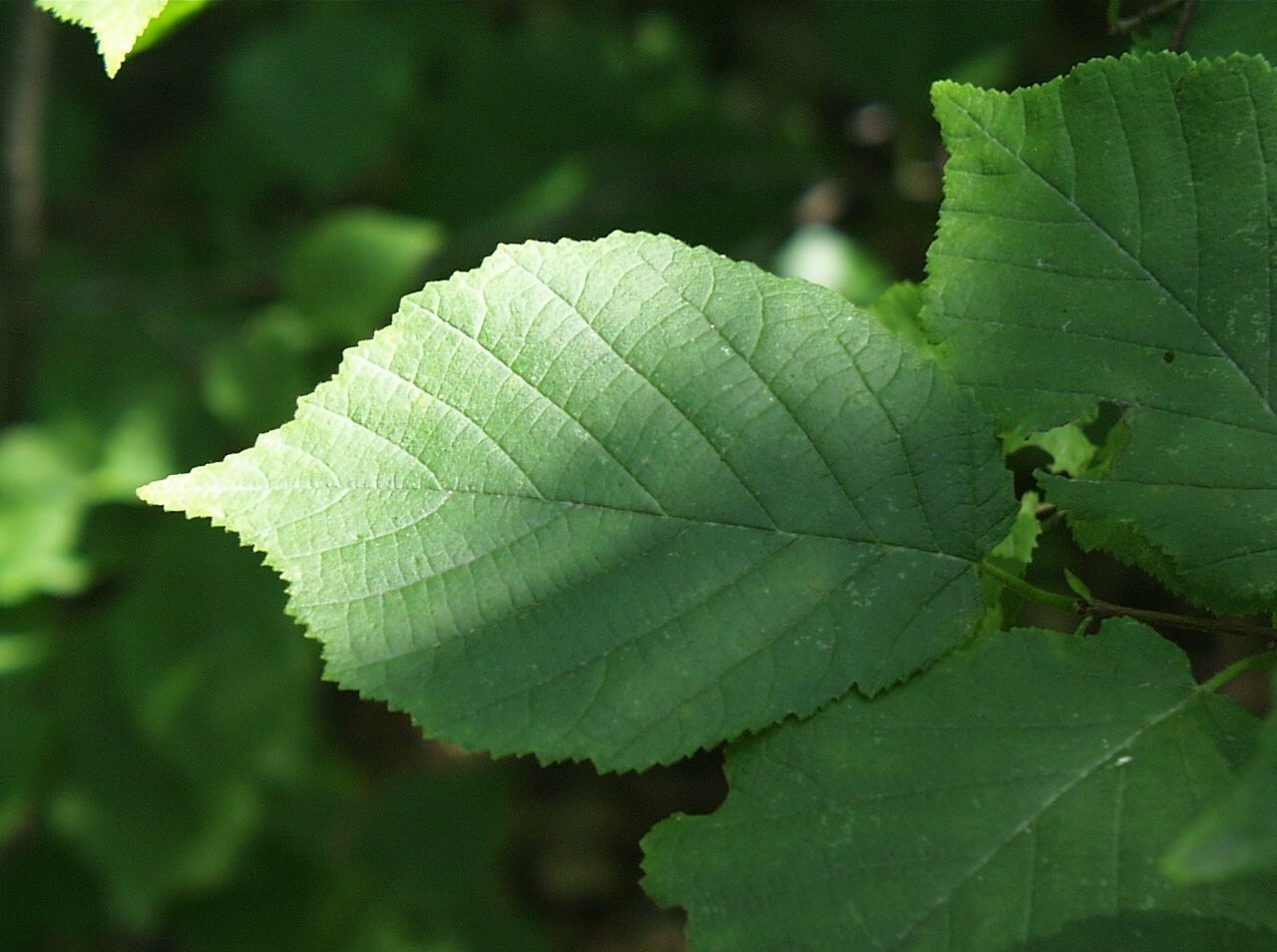

Conservation status
- Least Concern (IUCN 3.1)

- Secure (NatureServe)

Scientific classification
- Kingdom: Plantae
- Clade: Tracheophytes
- Clade: Angiosperms
- Clade: Eudicots
- Clade: Rosids
- Order: Fagales
- Family: Betulaceae
- Genus: Corylus
- Species: C. americana

Binomial name
- Corylus americana Marshall, 1785
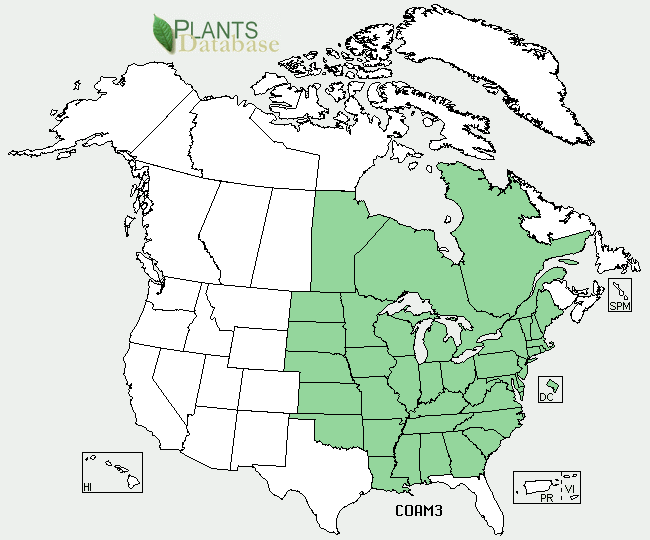
- Distribution of American hazelnut

= Corylus americana =

Species of flowering plant

Corylus americana, the American hazelnut or American hazel, is a species of deciduous shrub in the genus Corylus, native to the eastern and central United States and extreme southern parts of eastern and central Canada.

== Description ==
The American hazelnut grows to a height of roughly 2.5 to 5 m (8 to 16 ft), with a crown spread of 3 to 4.5 m (10 to 15 ft). It is a medium to large shrub, which under some conditions can take the likeness of a small tree. It is often multi-stemmed with long outward growing branches that form a dense spreading or spherical shape. It spreads by sending up suckers from underground rhizomes 10 to 15 cm (4 to 6 in) below the surface.

It blooms in very early to mid spring, producing hanging male (staminate) catkins 4 to 8 cm (1 1/2 to 3 1/4 in) long, and clusters of 2–5 tiny female (pistillate) flowers enclosed in the protective bracts of a bud, with their red styles sticking out at the tip. The male catkins develop in the fall and remain over the winter. Each male flower on a catkin has a pair of bracts and four stamens.

American hazelnut produces edible nuts that mature at a time between July and October. Each nut is enclosed in two leaf-like bracts with irregularly laciniate margins.

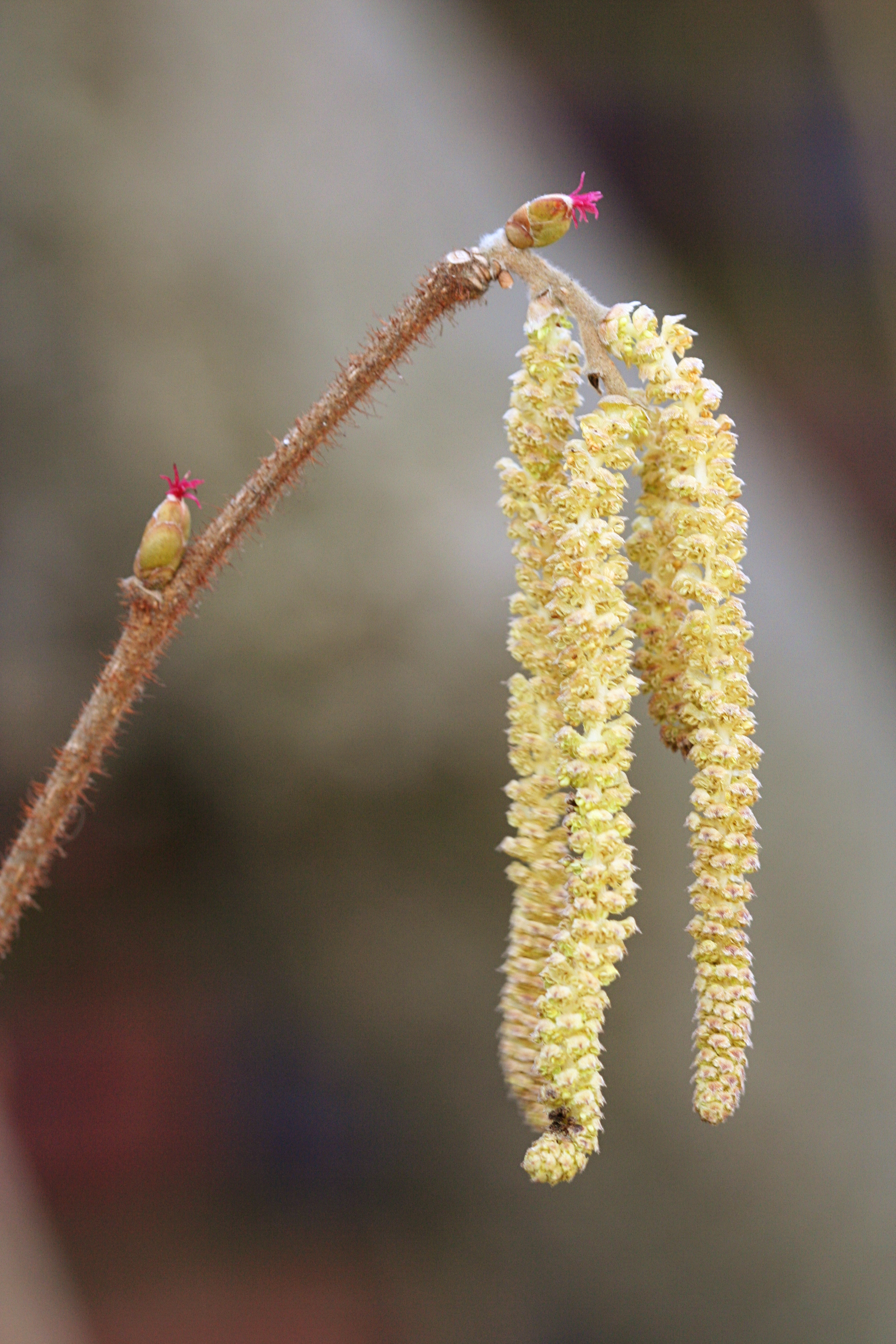
Small bud-like female flowers and hanging male catkins

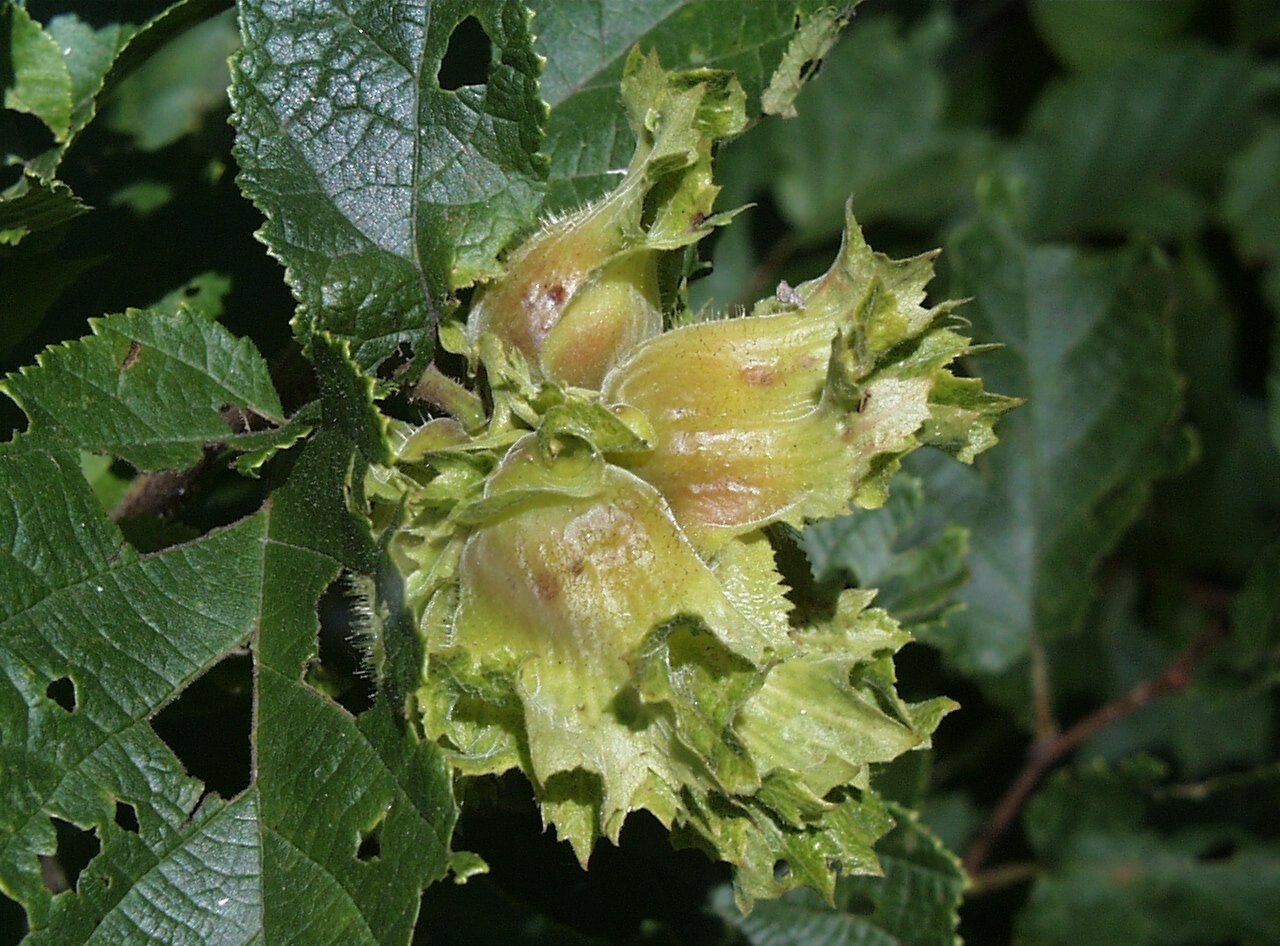
Fruit cluster (nuts enclosed in leaflike bracts)

== Ecology ==
The nuts produced by American hazelnut are a mast of squirrels, whitetail deer, foxes, ruffed grouse, northern bobwhites, pheasants, turkey, woodpeckers, and other animals. The leaves are browsed on by whitetail deer, moose, and rabbits. The male catkins are a food staple of ruffed grouse and turkey throughout the winter. The low-hanging shrubs form habitat for many animal species.

== Uses ==
The nuts are edible raw, although smaller than the more commonly cultivated filberts (Corylus maxima, Corylus avellana, and hybrids thereof). They also possess an oil content comparable to C. avellana, making them well-suited to culinary oil production.

Native Americans used Corylus americana for medicinal purposes, such as hives, biliousness, diarrhea, cramps, hay fever, childbirth, hemorrhages, prenatal strength and teething, to induce vomiting and to heal cuts.

=== Cultivation ===
Corylus americana is cultivated as an ornamental plant for native plant gardens, and in wildlife gardens to attract and keep fauna in an area. There are cultivated hybrids of Corylus americana with Corylus avellana which aim to combine the larger nuts of the latter with the former's resistance to a North American fungus Cryptosporella anomala.

It is a medium to fast-growing species, that suckers moderately, eventually producing a multi-stemmed, clump appearance.

It adapts well to a range of soil pH and types, but does best on well-drained loams. American hazelnut prefers full sun for best growth and development. Though it can grow and persist in partial shade, plant density and fruit production are greatly reduced.
