= Aethia rossmoori =

Aethia rossmoori Temporal range: Late Miocene

Scientific classification
- Kingdom: Animalia
- Phylum: Chordata
- Class: Aves
- Order: Charadriiformes
- Family: Alcidae
- Genus: Aethia
- Species: †A. rossmoori

Binomial name
- †Aethia rossmoori Howard, 1968

Extinct species of bird

Aethia rossmoori is an extinct species of Aethia that lived during the Late Miocene.

== Distribution ==
Aethia rossmoori fossils are known from Laguna Hills in Orange County, California.
