= Puffinus calhouni =

Puffinus calhouni Temporal range: Late Miocene

Scientific classification
- Domain: Eukaryota
- Kingdom: Animalia
- Phylum: Chordata
- Class: Aves
- Order: Procellariiformes
- Family: Procellariidae
- Genus: Puffinus
- Species: †P. calhouni

Binomial name
- †Puffinus calhouni Howard, 1968

Extinct species of bird

Puffinus calhouni is an extinct species of Puffinus that lived during the Late Miocene.

== Distribution ==
Puffinus calhouni fossils are known from Laguna Hills in Orange County, California.
