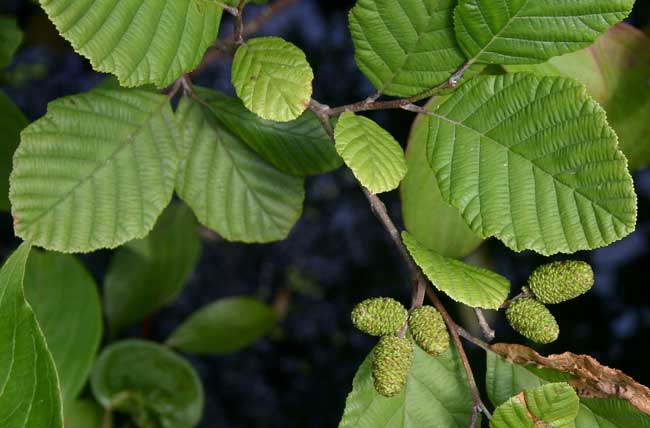
- Leaves of speckled alder

Conservation status
- Least Concern (IUCN 3.1)

- Secure (NatureServe)

Scientific classification
- Kingdom: Plantae
- Clade: Embryophytes
- Clade: Tracheophytes
- Clade: Angiosperms
- Clade: Eudicots
- Clade: Rosids
- Order: Fagales
- Family: Betulaceae
- Genus: Alnus
- Subgenus: Alnus subg. Alnus
- Species: A. incana

Binomial name
- Alnus incana (L.) Moench

Subspecies
- Alnus incana subsp. incana; Alnus incana subsp. kolaensis (N.I.Orlova) Á.Löve & D.Löve; Alnus incana subsp. rugosa (Du Roi) R.T.Clausen; Alnus incana subsp. tenuifolia (Nutt.) Breitung
- Range map

Synonyms
- Alnus februaria var. incana (L.) Kuntze, nom. superfl.; Alnus glutinosa var. incana (L.) Pers.; Betula alnus var. incana L. (1753); Betula incana (L.) L.f.

= Alnus incana =

Species of tree

Alnus incana, the grey alder, tag alder or speckled alder, is a species of multi-stemmed, shrubby tree in the birch family, with a wide range across the cooler parts of the Northern Hemisphere. Tolerant of wetter soils, it can slowly spread with runners and is a common sight in swamps and wetlands.

== Description ==
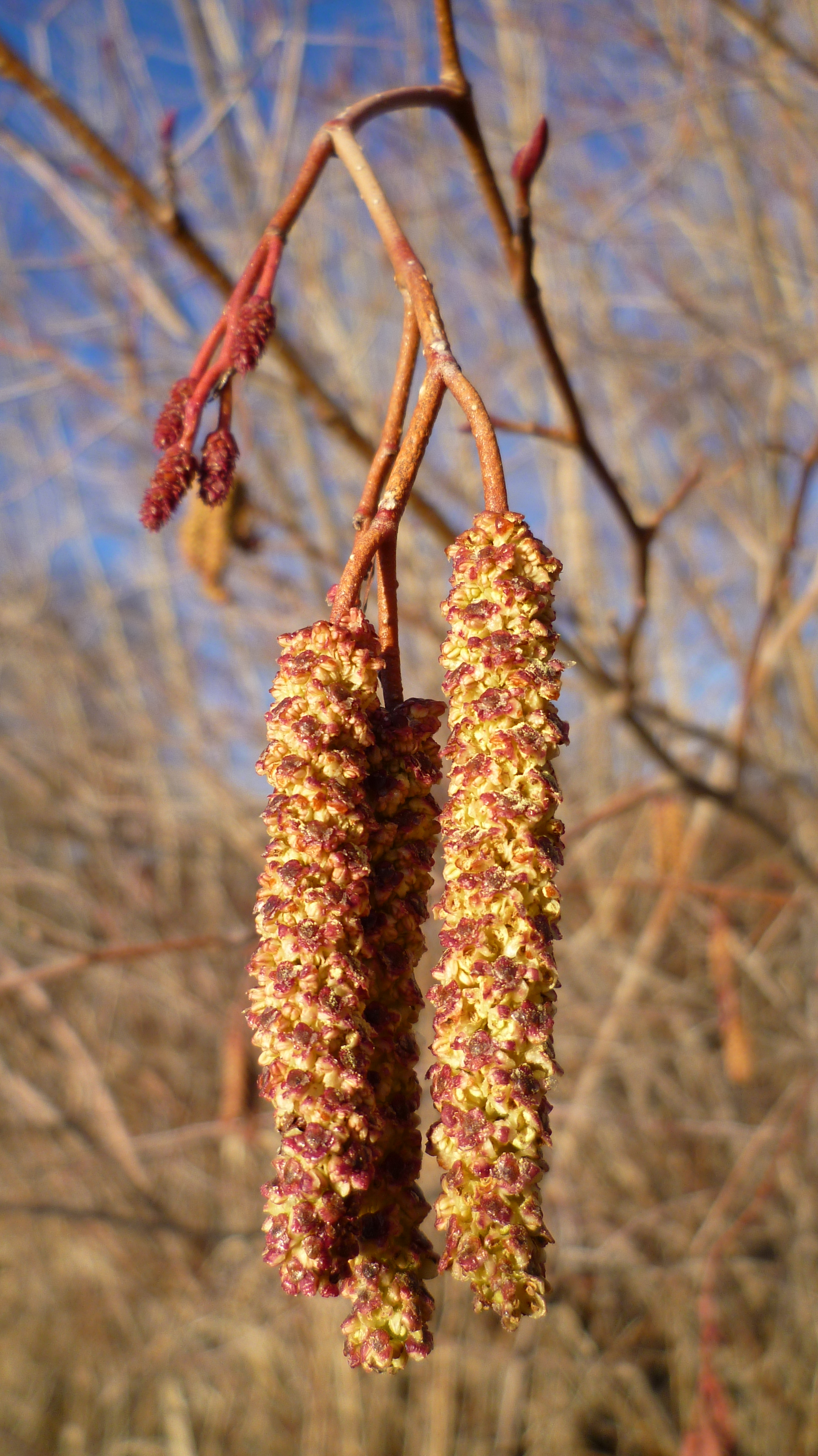
Alnus incana var. tenuifolia male flowers in early spring along the Columbia River

It is a small- to medium-sized tree 15–20 metres (49–66 ft) tall with smooth grey bark even in old age, its life span being a maximum of 60 to 100 years. The leaves are matt green, ovoid, 5–11 centimetres (2–4 1/4 in) long and 4–8 cm (1 1/2–3 1/4 in) broad. The flowers are catkins, appearing early in spring before the leaves emerge, the male catkins pendulous and 5–10 cm (2–4 in) long, the female catkins 1.5 cm (5/8 in) long and one cm broad when mature in late autumn. The seeds are small, 1–2 millimetres (1/32–3/32 in) long, and light brown with a narrow encircling wing. The grey alder has a shallow root system, and is marked not only by vigorous production of stump suckers, but also by root suckers, especially in the northern parts of its range. The wood resembles that of the black alder (Alnus glutinosa), but is somewhat paler and of little economic value.

== Subspecies ==
There are four to six subspecies, some treated as separate species by some authors:

- Alnus incana subsp. incana; grey alder – Northern Europe and northwestern Asia, and central and southern Europe in mountains, mainly in the regions of the Alps, Carpathians and the Caucasus
- Alnus incana subsp. hirsuta (Spach) Á. & D.Löve (=A. hirsuta (Spach) Rupr.); Manchurian alder – In mountains of Northeast Asia and Central Asia
- Alnus incana subsp. kolaensis (N.I.Orlova) Á. & D.Löve. – Subarctic northeast Europe
- Alnus incana subsp. oblongifolia (=Alnus oblongifolia); Arizona alder – Madrean Sky Islands of southwestern North America, in Arizona, New Mexico, and Northwestern Mexico
- Alnus incana subsp. rugosa (Du Roi) R.T.Clausen (=A. rugosa Du Roi); speckled alder – Much of Canada below the tree line, and the Northeastern United States
- Alnus incana subsp. tenuifolia (Nutt.) Breitung (=A. tenuifolia Nutt.); mountain alder, or thinleaf alder – Western North America, including New Mexico to California and Alaska; the roots have nitrogen-fixing nodules.
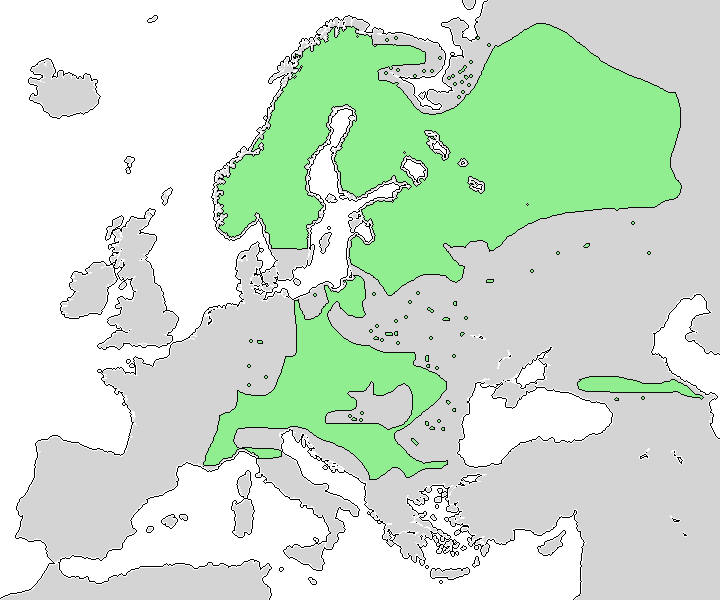
A. incana subsp. incana range

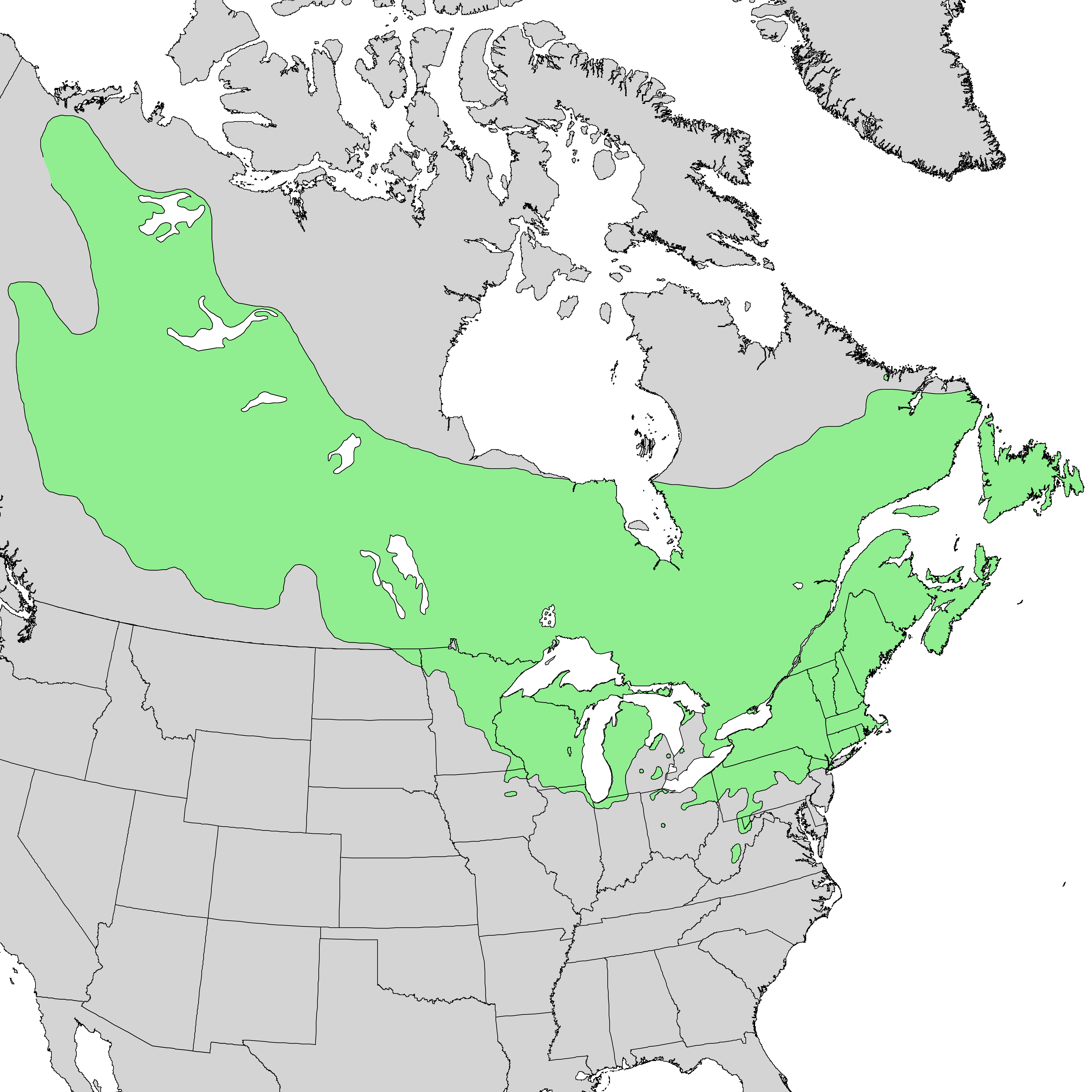
A. incana subsp. rugosa range

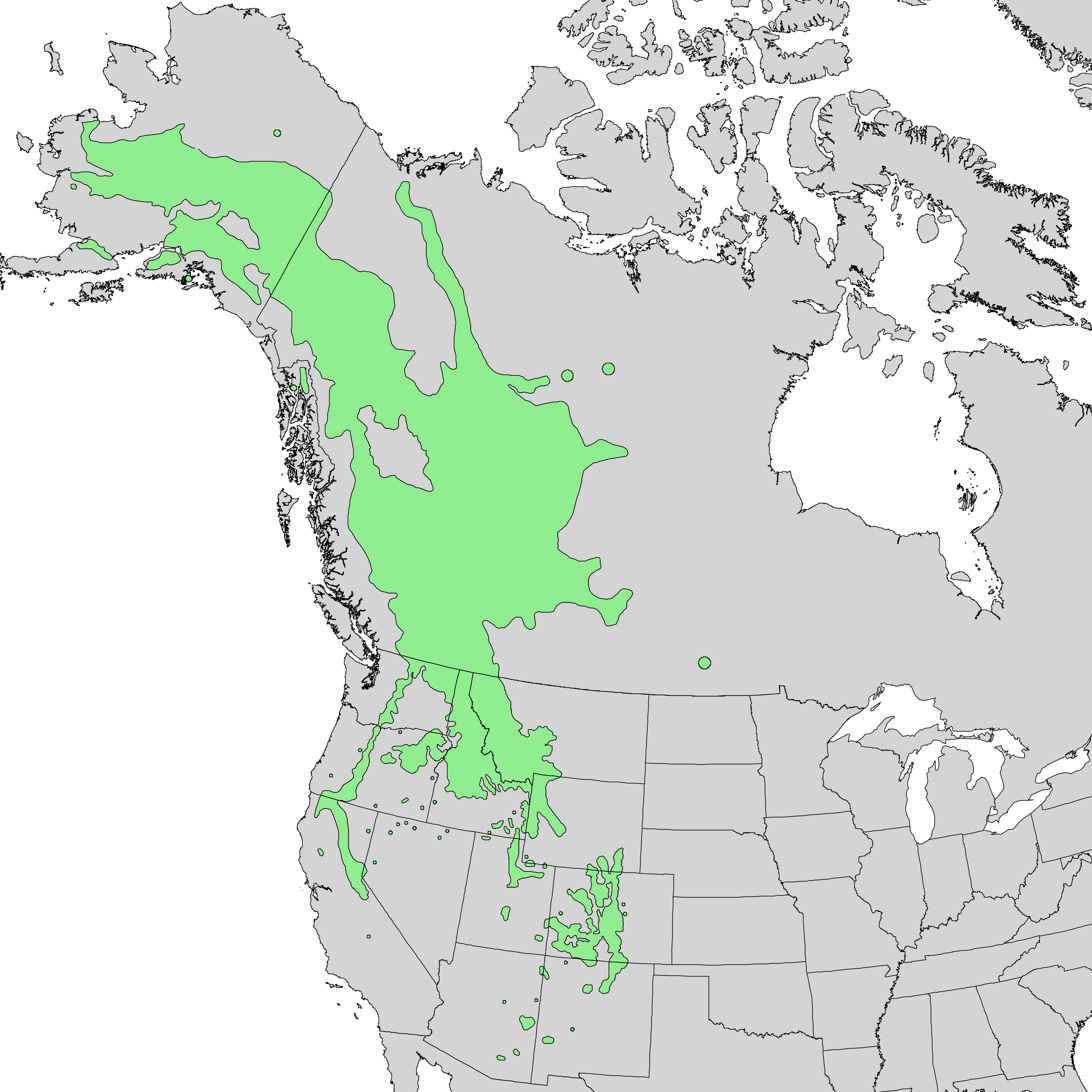
A. incana subsp. tenuifolia range

== Ecology ==
Alnus incana is a light-demanding, fast-growing tree that grows well on poorer soils. In central Europe, it is a colonist of alluvial land alongside mountain brooks and streams, occurring at elevations up to 1,500 metres (4,900 ft). However, it does not require moist soil, and will also colonize screes and shallow stony slopes. In the northern part of its range, it is a common tree species at sea level in forests, abandoned fields and on lakeshores. Several species of Lepidoptera use grey alder as a food plant for their caterpillars. In the boreal forest area of Canada, A. incana is often associated with black spruce in the forest type termed black spruce–speckled alder. The larvae of the alder woolly sawfly sometimes cause considerable defoliation to the grey alder.

A. rugosa provides cover for wildlife, is browsed by deer and moose, and the seeds are eaten by birds.

== Chemistry ==
Pedunculagin is an ellagitannin found in the Manchurian alder (A. hirsuta var. microphylla).

== Uses ==
The tree is cultivated in parks and gardens. The cultivar 'Aurea', with green-gold leaves, has gained the Royal Horticultural Society's Award of Garden Merit.

It is sometimes used in afforestation and agroforestry in non-fertile or wet soils which it enriches by means of nitrogen fixing bacteria in its root nodules.

Alder is an excellent tree for coppicing and pollarding. Its cut branches may be fed to browsing livestock such as cows and goats, then used for kindling, firewood, or light construction - while root systems fertilize adjacent agricultural plots via nitrogen fixation.

The Zuni people use the bark of the tenuifolia subspecies to dye deerskin reddish brown.

The Ho-Chunk eat the bark of the rugosa subspecies when their stomachs are "sour" or upset.

Its wood and bark are used in smoking meat, particularly fish and duck.
